= Lamington Bridge =

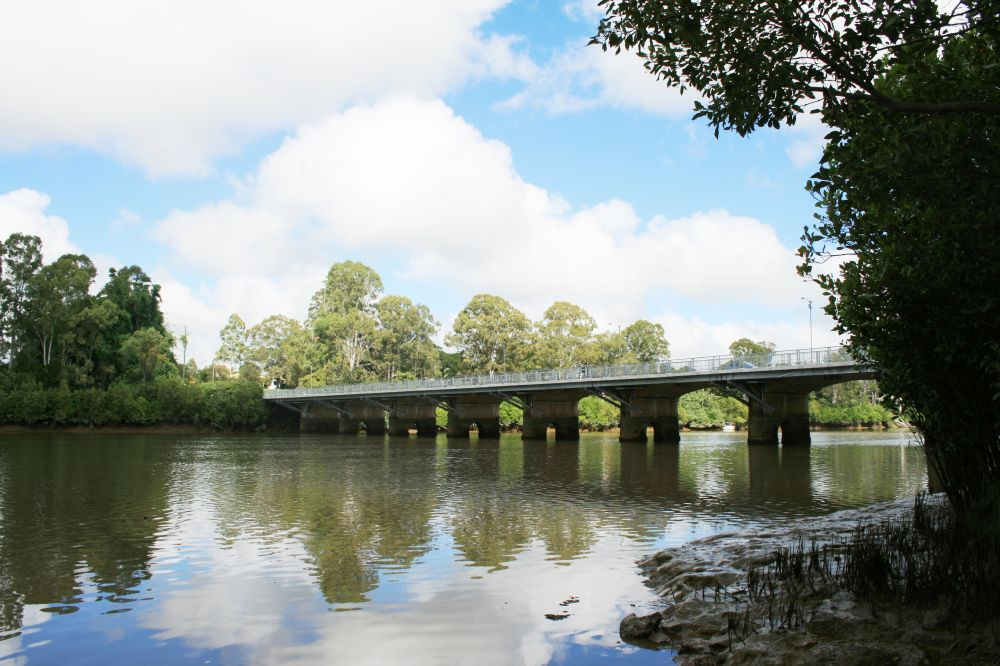
- Lamington Bridge, from north-east, 2009
- Coordinates: 25.5445°S 152.6872°E
- Carries: Motor vehicles
- Crosses: Mary River
- Locale: Maryborough & Tinana, Queensland, Australia
- Heritage status: Queensland Heritage Register
- Preceded by: highset timber bridge (1874–1893)

Characteristics
- Design: Arch bridges
- Material: Reinforced concrete
- Total length: 182.6 metres (599 ft)
- Width: 6 metres (20 ft)
- No. of spans: 11 (16.6 metre each)

History
- Designer: Alfred Barton Brady
- Constructed by: AcArdle and Thompson
- Construction start: 1894
- Construction end: 1896
- Opened: 30 October 1896

Location
- Interactive map of Lamington Bridge

Lamington Bridge
- Location within Queensland
- 25.5446°S 152.6873°E
- Location: Gympie Road Tinana across the Mary River to Ferry Street, Maryborough, Fraser Coast Region, Queensland, Australia

History
- Design period: 1870s–1890s (late 19th century)
- Built: c. 1896–1970

Site notes
- Architect: Alfred Barton Brady

Queensland Heritage Register
- Official name: Lamington Bridge
- Type: state heritage (built)
- Designated: 21 October 1992
- Reference no.: 600721
- Significant period: 1890s (fabric)
- Significant components: pier/s (bridge), kerbing and channelling
- Builders: McArdle & Thompson

Lamington Bridge is a heritage-listed road bridge over the Mary River from Gympie Road, Tinana to Ferry Street, Maryborough, both in the Fraser Coast Region, Queensland, Australia. It was designed by Alfred Barton Brady and built from c. 1896 to 1970 by McArdle & Thompson. It was added to the Queensland Heritage Register on 21 October 1992.

The bridge is one of the earliest concrete bridges in Australia. As it replaced a high set timber bridge which was demolished during the disastrous floods of 1893, the present bridge is a low level bridge designed for inundation, as it is less likely to be damaged by floating debris during floods. It was opened to traffic on 30 October 1896 and was named in honour of Lord Lamington, Governor of Queensland. The bridge is inundated with water once the river level reaches 5.5metres. This most recently happened during the March 2025 flood.

== History ==
The Lamington Bridge, which crosses the Mary River from Tinana to Maryborough, was built to the design of AB Brady and opened in 1896. It replaced an earlier highset timber bridge constructed in 1874 and is one of Australia's oldest concrete bridges.

The port of Maryborough was established in the late 1840s to supply sheep stations on the Burnett River and provide an outlet for their wool. It was a port of entry and during the 1860s and 1870s Maryborough flourished as the principal port of the nearby Gympie goldfield and as an outlet for timber and sugar. The establishment of manufacturing plants and primary industries sustained its growth as a major regional centre.

The first bridge over the Mary River was a timber high-set bridge constructed in 1874, upstream from the current bridge. During the disastrous floods of 1893, this bridge was partially demolished, cutting off the important road that linked Gympie to the port. The new bridge was designed by Alfred Barton Brady.

Brady was born and trained in England, designed many notable bridges and was one of Queensland's most important early engineers. He served the Queensland Government for 37 years from 1885, at first with the Railways Department, then from 1889 with the Public Works Department, and then as the Queensland Government Architect and engineer for bridges from 1892. Although Brady designed many important and handsome public buildings, his forte was bridge design. As well as the Lamington Bridge, Brady was responsible for the design of the Gairloch Bridge over the Herbert River at Ingham (1889–1890); the Granville Bridge in Maryborough (1889–1890); the Burnett Bridge in Bundaberg (1890–1900) and the Victoria Bridge in Brisbane (1893–1997). Of the many bridges he designed, Lamington Bridge is his most technically innovative work.

In discussing his very early choice of concrete for the Lamington Bridge, Brady explained that "the Author was induced to recommend a concrete bridge, as it ensures a structure of very great strength, almost everlasting in character, and the annual expenditure in maintenance is consequently reduced to a minimum". The bridge was designed as a low level bridge, which was thought to be much safer during floods where floating debris causes much damage to high set bridges. Brady wrote a detailed account of the design and construction of Lamington Bridge in a paper he presented to the Institute of Engineers in 1900.

The bridge was designed in 1893 and tenders were called for the project in September 1894. The successful tenderers were Messrs AcArdle and Thompson of Brisbane. Construction followed and the completed structure cost about £25,000. The bridge was opened to traffic on 30 October 1896 by David Hay Dalrymple, MLA, Minister for Public Works. The bridge was named in honour of Baron Lamington KCMG, Governor of Queensland.

Lamington Bridge was widened in 1970 but the original handrails were retained and reused.

== Description ==
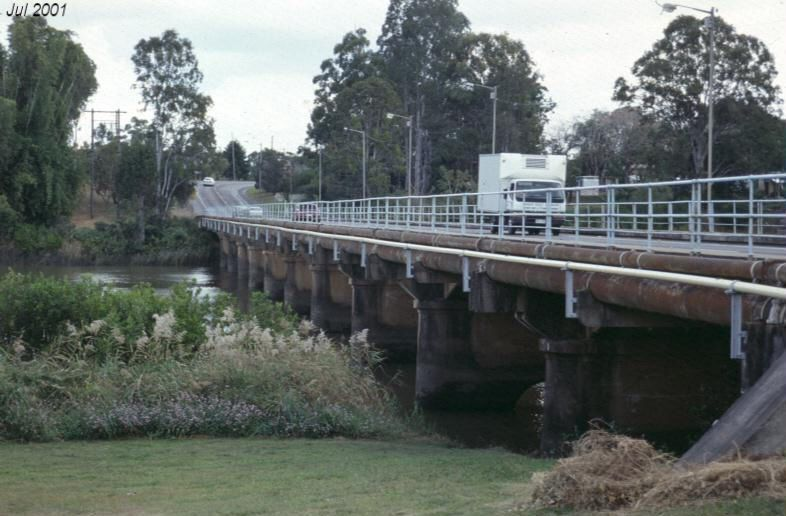
Lamington Bridge, 2001

Lamington Bridge is a low level bridge, designed for inundation, and crosses the Mary River immediately south of the city of Maryborough between Ferry Street in Maryborough and Gympie Road in Tinana.

It is a reinforced concrete structure comprising eleven spans of 15.2 metres (50 ft) clear or 16.6 metres (54 ft) centre to centre of piers. The bridge is reinforced on both faces with eleven rails, which were erected as frames and are bolted to the pier tops underneath the concrete and spliced with fishplates.

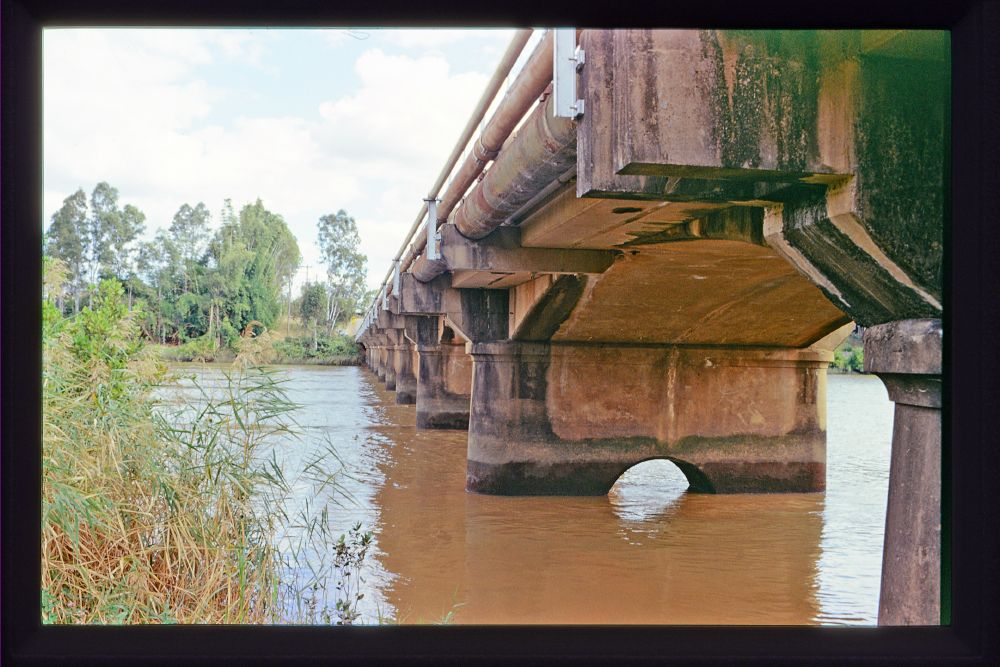
Deck and piers

The bridge has a solid deck, 6 metres (20 ft) wide, with circular segmental soffit and a depth at the centre of the roadway varying in each span from 3.4 to 0.51 metres (11.2 to 1.7 ft). The roadway camber is 0.13 metres (5.1 in) and there is an integral kerb at each side. The reinforcement consists of railway rails 92 millimetres (3.6 in) deep, with 82.6 metres (271 ft) long lower flanges. There are thirteen such rails running longitudinally in each face at 610 millimetres (24 in) centre, with clear cover of about 170 millimetres (6.7 in). The top and bottom rails are formed into eleven frames, each bolted to the pier top. The top member is continuous over the length of the bridge, achieved by fishplated connections.

== Heritage listing ==
The Lamington Bridge was listed on the former Register of the National Estate in 1986. It was listed on the Queensland Heritage Register on 21 October 1992 having satisfied the following criteria.

The place is important in demonstrating the evolution or pattern of Queensland's history.

The Lamington Bridge, opened in 1896, is important in illustrating the development of bridge design in Queensland and the importance of Maryborough as a port and outlet for the Gympie goldfield in the late 19th century.

The place is important in demonstrating a high degree of creative or technical achievement at a particular period.

The Lamington bridge has international importance as one of the first concrete girder bridges based on the Wuntsch system. It is technologically innovative as one of the earliest concrete bridges in Australia.

The place has a strong or special association with a particular community or cultural group for social, cultural or spiritual reasons.

The bridge is important as the most significant example of the work of Alfred Barton Brady who, during 37 years of work for several departments of the Queensland government, made a major contribution to the development of the state in both architectural and engineering design.

== Engineering heritage award ==
The bridge received a Historic Engineering Marker from Engineers Australia as part of its Engineering Heritage Recognition Program.
