= Burnett railway bridge =

Railway bridge in Queensland, Australia

Burnett Railway Bridge
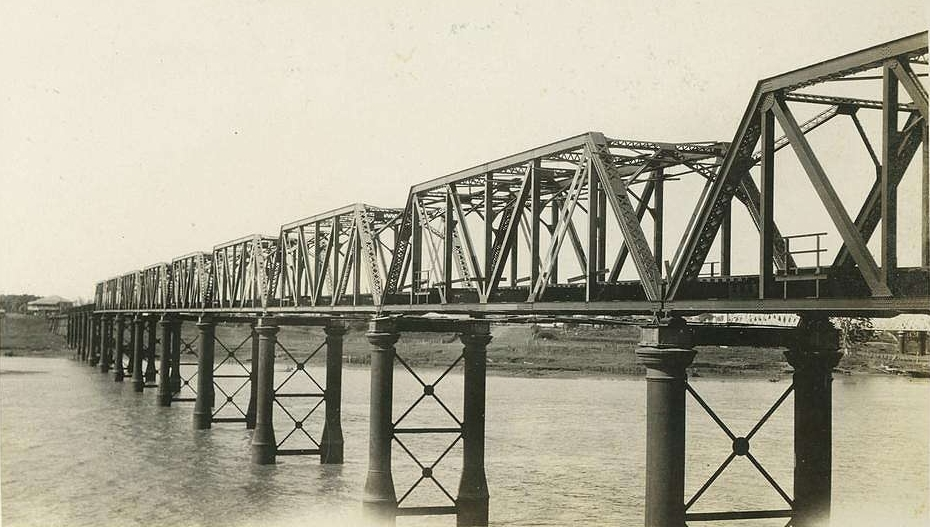
- Burnett Railway Bridge in 1924
- Coordinates: 24.86376°S 152.34378°E
- Carries: single track
- Crosses: Burnett River
- Locale: North Bundaberg, Queensland, Australia
- Official name: Burnett River Railway Bridge

Characteristics
- Design: Steel frame truss bridge
- Total length: 534m (Including approach spans)
- Longest span: Nine spans each of 33.4m

History
- Opened: 15 June 1891; 134 years ago

Location
- Interactive map of Burnett Railway Bridge

Burnett Railway Bridge is a railway bridge crossing the Burnett River in Bundaberg, Queensland, Australia. The bridge is located between Bundaberg Central and Bundaberg North to the west of Burnett Road Bridge.

== History ==
The Burnett Railway Bridge is a metal truss rail bridge spanning the Burnett River at Bundaberg, Queensland, and used by the North Coast Railway Line.

A railway had opened from North Bundaberg to Mount Perry in 1884. That line started from the opposite side of the Burnett River from the main part of Bundaberg in order to speed up construction of the line and save the cost of constructing a bridge. The 534-metre bridge over the river was eventually built to connect the two lines, and opened on 15 June 1891.

The bridge was the first permanent structure to span the Burnett River.

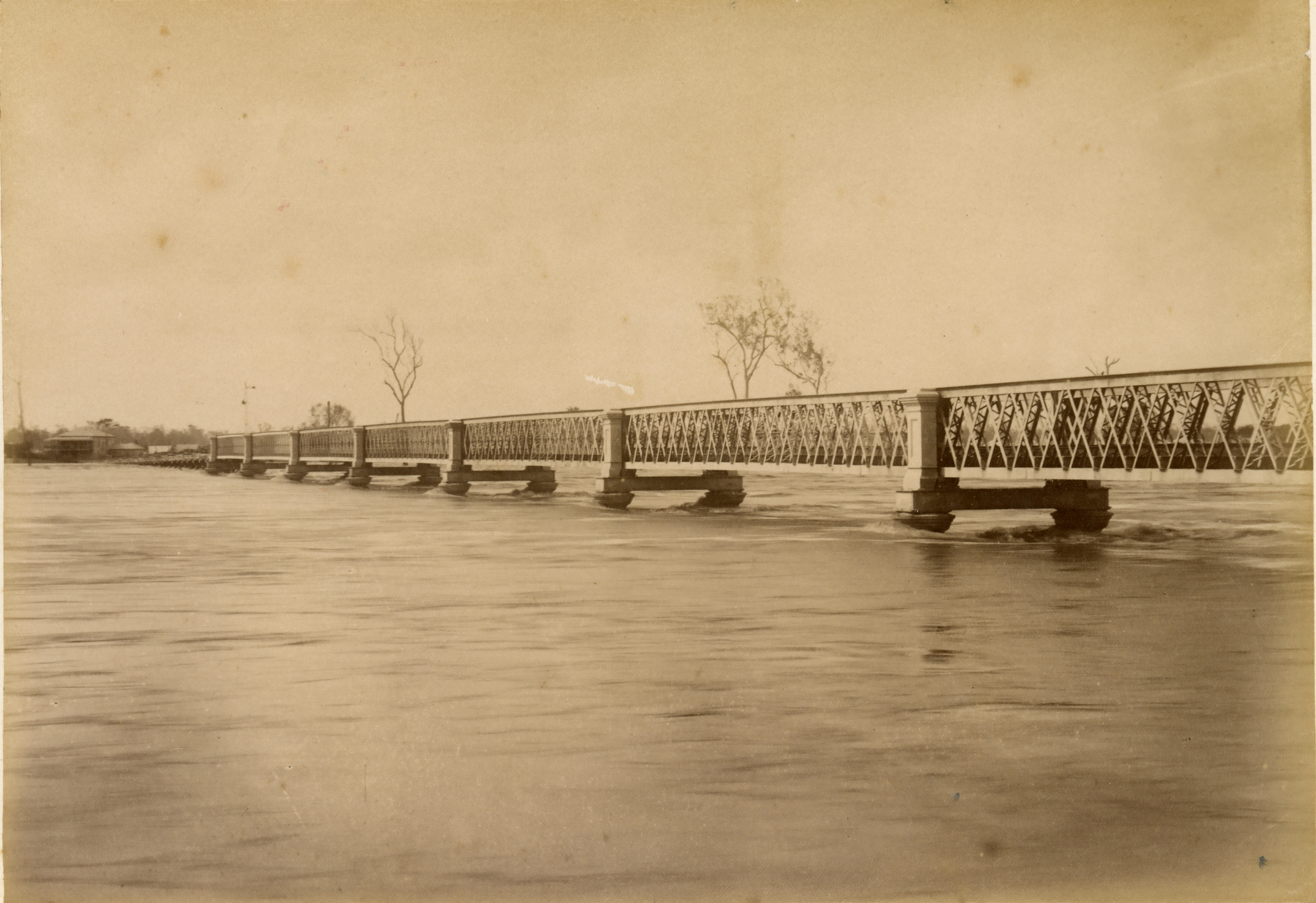
Burnett River railway bridge during 1893 flood

In 1893 there was a severe flooding event due to multiple cyclones. It was referred to as the Great Flood of 1893 and Black February flood. On 2 February, a tropical cyclone caused severe flooding across South East Queensland, including floods at Gympie, Maryborough and Bundaberg. The second cyclone struck on 11 February, initially causing only minor flood damage compared to the first flood.

On 13 February 1893, there was another flood in the Brisbane River, which resulted in the rapid rise of the Burnett. On 17 February, another cyclone crossed the Queensland coast near Bundaberg causing a downpour on the already drenched Brisbane River catchment, which resulted in the third flood of the year. Flood waters subsided on 21 February.

== Details ==
The Burnett River Rail Bridge is located 351.77 km from Brisbane in Bundaberg. It consists of a nine-span truss bridge each of 33.4 m. Together the approach spans and truss spans total at a length of 534 m. It carries a single track and a walkway for maintenance crew.

It was constructed in the 1890s using wrought iron lattice trusses for the main spans. To increase the strength of the bridge, the through girder spans were replaced in the 1920s with the current steel trusses seen today. There were further upgrades in the 1980s and 90s to replace the timber approach spans with more modern truss spans. This improved the clearances containers to be transported along the line.

The QR Network identified significant deterioration in the cast iron piers and placed a speed restriction of 15 kph on the bridge. In August 2009, Queensland Rail commissioned Jacobs SKM to undertake a load rating assessment on three bridges between Bundaberg and Gladstone on the North Coast Line. The Burnett River Bridge was selected as the first to be examined due to corrosion of the iron piers and its proximity to Bundaberg. The investigation would determine whether it was feasible to repair and maintain the bridge or whether it should be replaced.

A trial was carried out to test bending stresses in the piers and longitudinal stresses in the beams on the bridge. The trail was done to evaluate the effect of a locomotives braking load distribution on the bridge. As locomotive braking on bridges has sufficient capability to initiate cracks and increases the crack growth rate. To commence the test, the speed restriction was relaxed to 40kph and a 110 tonne 2250 class locomotive was used to represent an in-service train load.

The engineers had recommended that the bridge be replaced due to observed corrosion and cracking in the iron piers. The replacement of the bridge was expected to cost an excess of $100AU Million. However following suggested strengthening methods, it was determined that the bridge could achieve a further 30 years of service that would cost about 5% of the total replacement cost.
