= Kennedy Bridge =

Kennedy Bridge may refer to:

- Kennedy Bridge (Austria), across the Wien river in Vienna, Austria
- Kennedy Bridge (Adana), crossing the Seyhan River in Adana, Turkey
- Kennedy Bridge (Bonn), across the Rhine River in Bonn, Germany
- Kennedy Bridge (Bremerhaven), across the Geeste in Bremerhaven, Germany
- Kennedy Bridge, Bundaberg, a heritage-listed bridge across Bundaberg Creek, Queensland, Australia
- Kennedy Bridge (Hamburg), across the Alster in Hamburg, Germany
- Kennedy Bridge (Minnesota), in Mankato, Minnesota, United States
- Kennedy Bridge (Niamey), the main crossing for the Niger River, in Niamey, Niger
- Kennedy Bridge (Kimberton, Pennsylvania), in Chester County, Pennsylvania, United States

== See also ==
- John F. Kennedy Bridge (Germany), across the Isar, in Munich, Germany
- John F. Kennedy Boulevard Bridge, across the Schuylkill River in Pennsylvania, United States
- John F. Kennedy Memorial Bridge across the Ohio River, connecting Louisville, Kentucky and Jeffersonville, Indiana, United States
- Eastvale Bridge, officially known as the John F. Kennedy Memorial Bridge, across the Beaver River in Pennsylvania, United States
