= Kennedy Bridge, Bundaberg =

Kennedy Bridge
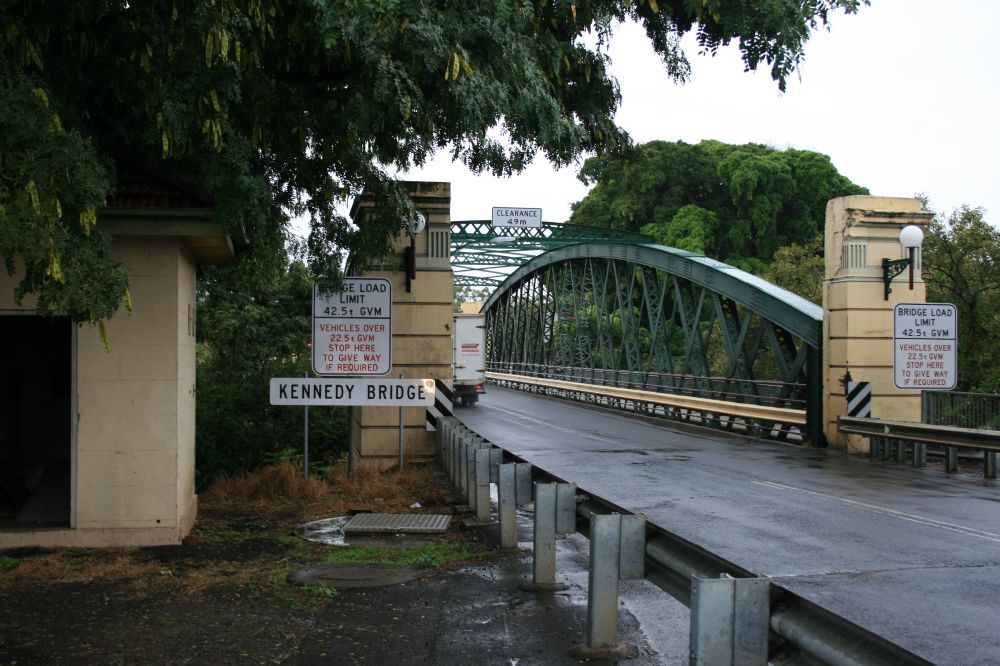
- Kennedy Bridge, from Bundaberg Central side, 2009

- Location within Queensland Location within Australia
- 24.8637°S 152.3575°E
- Location: Bourbong Street between Bundaberg Central & Bundaberg East, Bundaberg, Bundaberg Region, Queensland, Australia

History
- Design period: 1870s–1890s (late 19th century)
- Built: 1899

Site notes
- Architect: Alfred Barton Brady
- Architectural style: Classicism

Queensland Heritage Register
- Official name: Kennedy Bridge, Saltwater Creek Road Bridge
- Type: state heritage (built)
- Designated: 21 October 1992
- Reference no.: 600367
- Significant period: 1890s (fabric)
- Significant components: furniture/fittings, pylon/s

Kennedy Bridge is a heritage-listed road bridge on Bourbong Street crossing Bundaberg Creek from Bundaberg Central to Bundaberg East in Bundaberg, Bundaberg Region, Queensland, Australia. It was designed by Alfred Barton Brady and built in 1899. It is also known as Saltwater Creek Road Bridge. It was added to the Queensland Heritage Register on 21 October 1992.

== History ==
The Kennedy Bridge is a single span metal truss road bridge crossing Bundaberg Creek (also called Saltwater Creek), a tributary of the Burnett River, at Bundaberg. It was constructed in 1899 and was the smaller of two technically and visually related bridges designed by A.B. Brady for Bundaberg.

The Burnett area was first settled by Europeans in the 1840s and 50s as a series of pastoral runs. In the late 1860s, as good agricultural land around Maryborough began to be scarce, agriculturalists and timbergetters became interested in land on the navigable Burnett River to the north. The foundation settlers of Bundaberg selected land in 1867–68 under the "Sugar and Coffee Regulations" stemming from the Crown Lands Alienation Act of 1860s which aimed to promote agriculture and closer settlement. The site of Bundaberg was officially surveyed in 1869. Coastal traffic grew, and copper was first mined at Mount Perry in 1871, which enabled Bundaberg to develop as a port and supply centre, in spite of competition from Maryborough for this trade. The provision of amenities was therefore of importance to the development of Bundaberg and this included bridges.

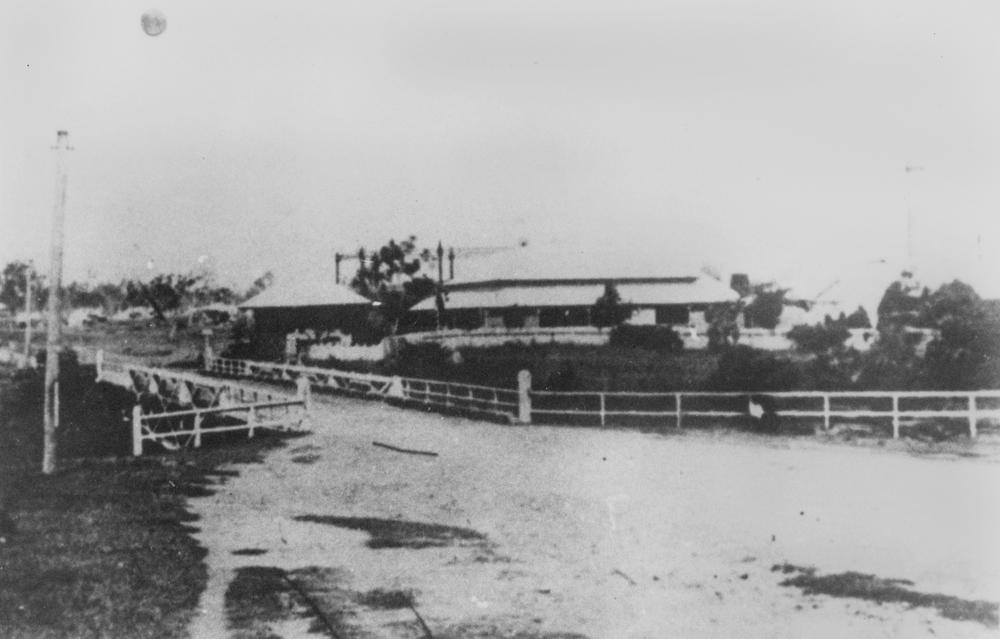
Adam's Bridge, Bundaberg, 1878

Although the higher southern bank of the Burnett River was officially surveyed as the town site, both sides developed and were initially linked only by ferry. Prior to 1872, the creek prevented the movement of vehicular traffic between the town of Bundaberg and the Woongarra Division to the east. Government action was urged in 1872 and money voted for the construction of a bridge. However, every tender exceeded the government estimate. The difficulty was solved when local property owner, Walter Adams, assisted the project by deliberately underbidding. A timber bridge, known as Adam's Bridge, was built and was the first in the district.

Adam's Bridge was replaced by another timber bridge in 1878. It was officially opened on Tuesday 26 March 1878 by the Queensland Governor, Arthur Kennedy, after whom the bridge was named.

In the 1880s, Bundaberg boomed with the growth of the sugar industry in the region. Handsome and substantial masonry buildings began to rise in the city as evidence of its growing importance and prosperity. It was planned to replace the timber bridges, weakened by heavy traffic, by bridges not only stronger, but more in keeping the general upgrading of civic buildings.

As a parallel project, two bridges of related design by A.B. Brady were constructed; the Burnett Bridge from Quay Street to Bundaberg North and this much smaller Kennedy Bridge across the Bundaberg Creek which opened in December 1899. It was funded under the Local Works Loan Act of 1880 and the Bundaberg Town Council and Woongarra Divisional Board bore two-thirds of its cost. It provided an example of co-operation between urban and rural local authorities for the advancement of the district in general.

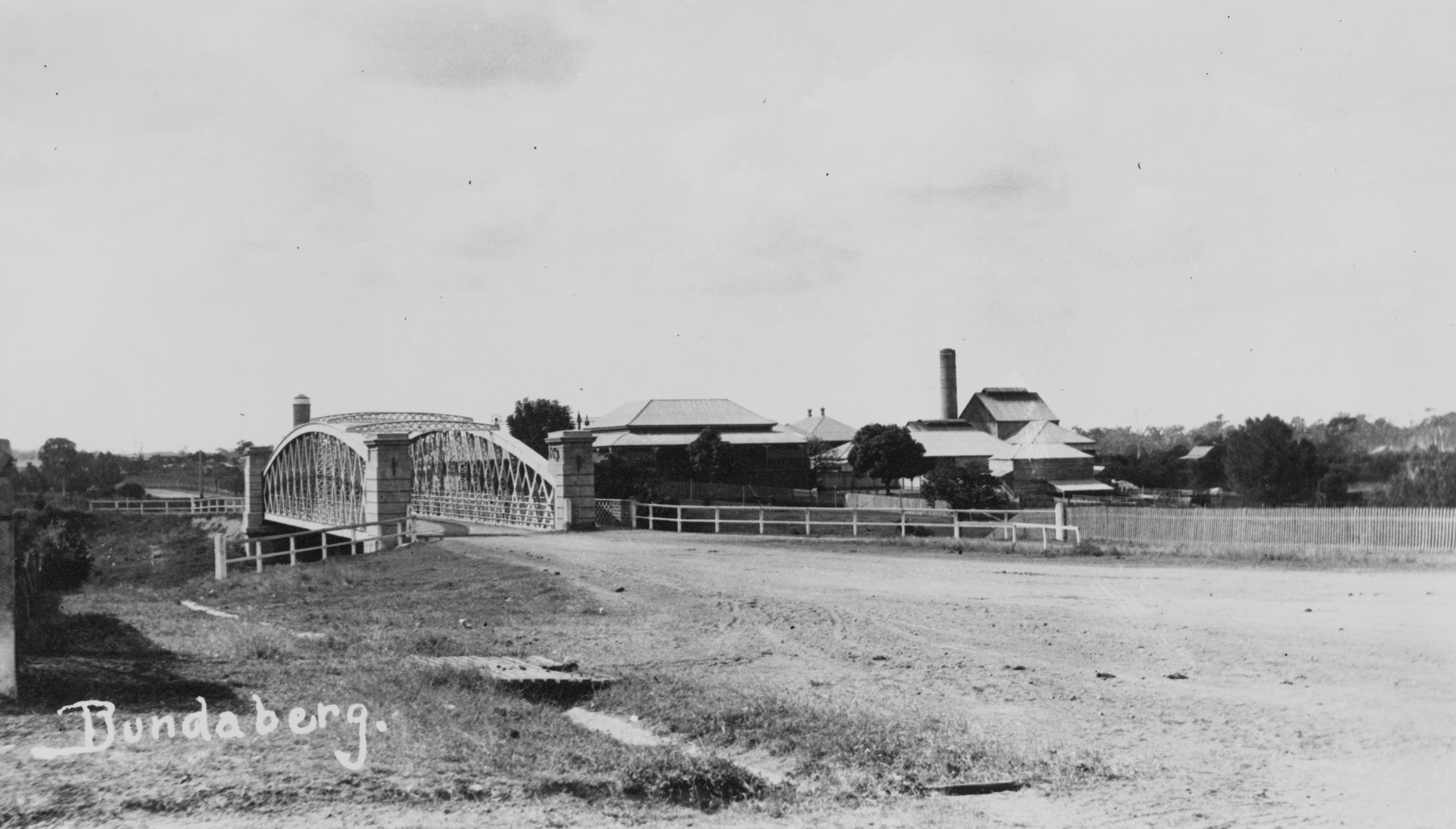
Kennedy Bridge at Bundaberg, circa 1911

The Kennedy Bridge is a reduced version of the Burnett Bridge which was opened on 24 August 1900. Both have similarities in structural design and appearance to the 1897 Victoria Bridge in Brisbane, which was demolished in the 1960s. All were designed by engineer and Government Architect, Alfred Barton Brady.

A.B. Brady was born in 1856 and received his training in England. He became one of Queensland's most important early engineers and served the state in various departments for 37 years. He worked initially with the railways from 1885, then from 1889 with the Public Works Department, and then as Government Architect and engineer for bridges from 1892. Although Brady designed many important and handsome public buildings, his forte was bridge design and he designed a number of notable bridges. The Kennedy Bridge is interesting as an example of his work which is still in use and little altered.

== Description ==
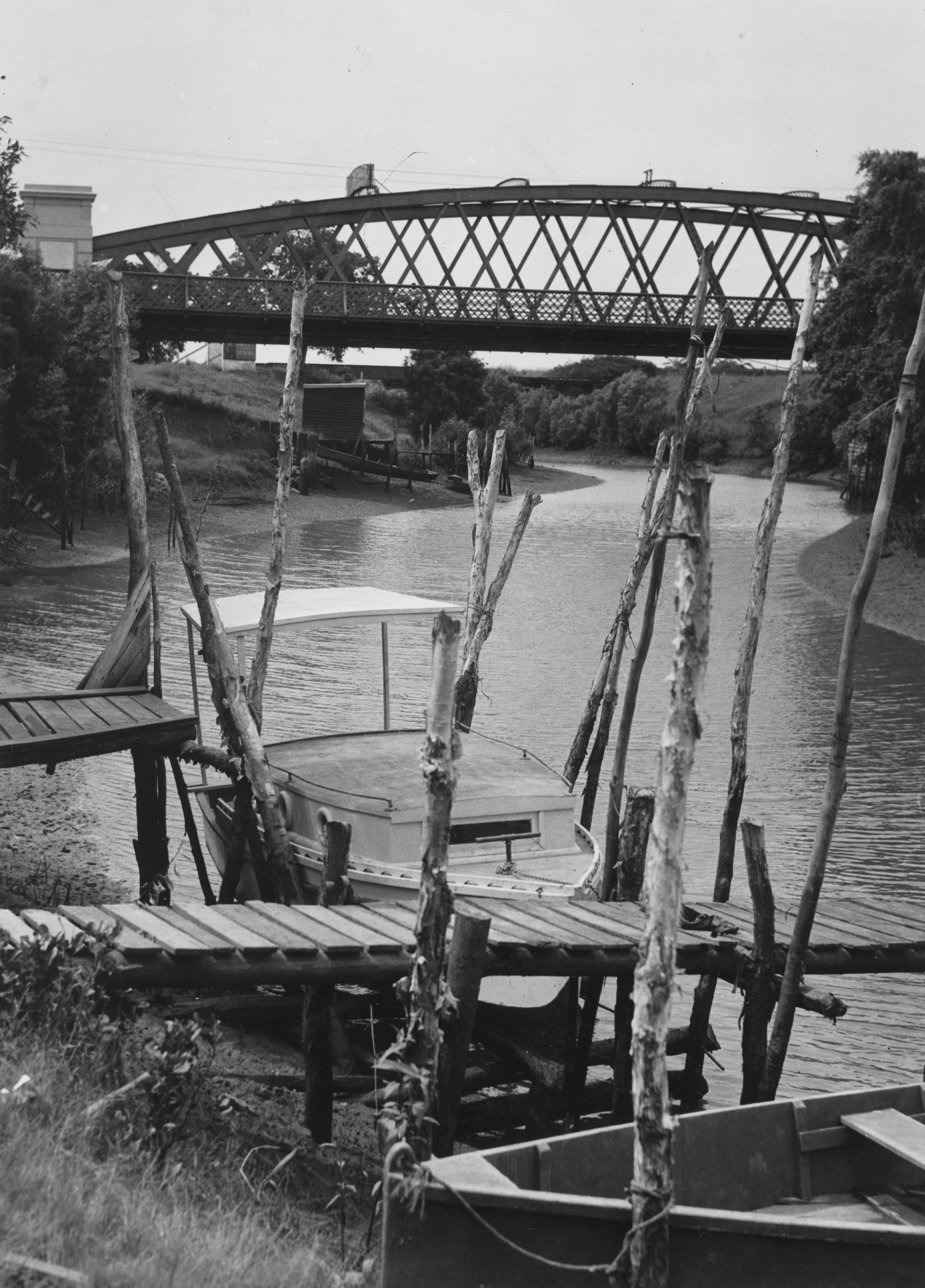
Kennedy Bridge, 1939

Kennedy Bridge joins Bourbong Street and Bourbong Street East over Saltwater Creek. It has a single metal truss span of 48.8 metres (160 ft) and metal lattice trusses with a curved upper chord. It carries a 7.3-metre (24 ft) roadway and a footpath. The metal deck spans between the lower chords of the trusses.

Flanking the entrances to the bridge and rising above the trusses are L-shaped concrete pylons, square in appearance from the roadway. They are neo-classical in influence and have a Doric style entablature on a rusticated base. There are lights on decorative metal brackets facing the approaches.

Repair work to the bridge was carried out in 1991 and it has since been repainted. It remains in very much its original form.

== Heritage listing ==
Kennedy Bridge was listed on the Queensland Heritage Register on 21 October 1992 having satisfied the following criteria.

The place is important in demonstrating the evolution or pattern of Queensland's history.

Kennedy Bridge, opened in 1899, is important in illustrating the development and importance of Bundaberg in the late 19th and early 20th centuries as the centre of one of Queensland's most significant sugar-growing regions.

The place is important in demonstrating the principal characteristics of a particular class of cultural places.

It is an important example of its type and is similar to, and closely associated with, the Burnett River Bridge, which was opened in 1900.

The place has a special association with the life or work of a particular person, group or organisation of importance in Queensland's history.

It is important as a design of Alfred Barton Brady who, during 37 years of work for several departments of the Queensland government, made a major contribution to the development of the state in both architectural and engineering design.
