= Alfred Barton Brady =

Civil engineer and architect (1856–1932)

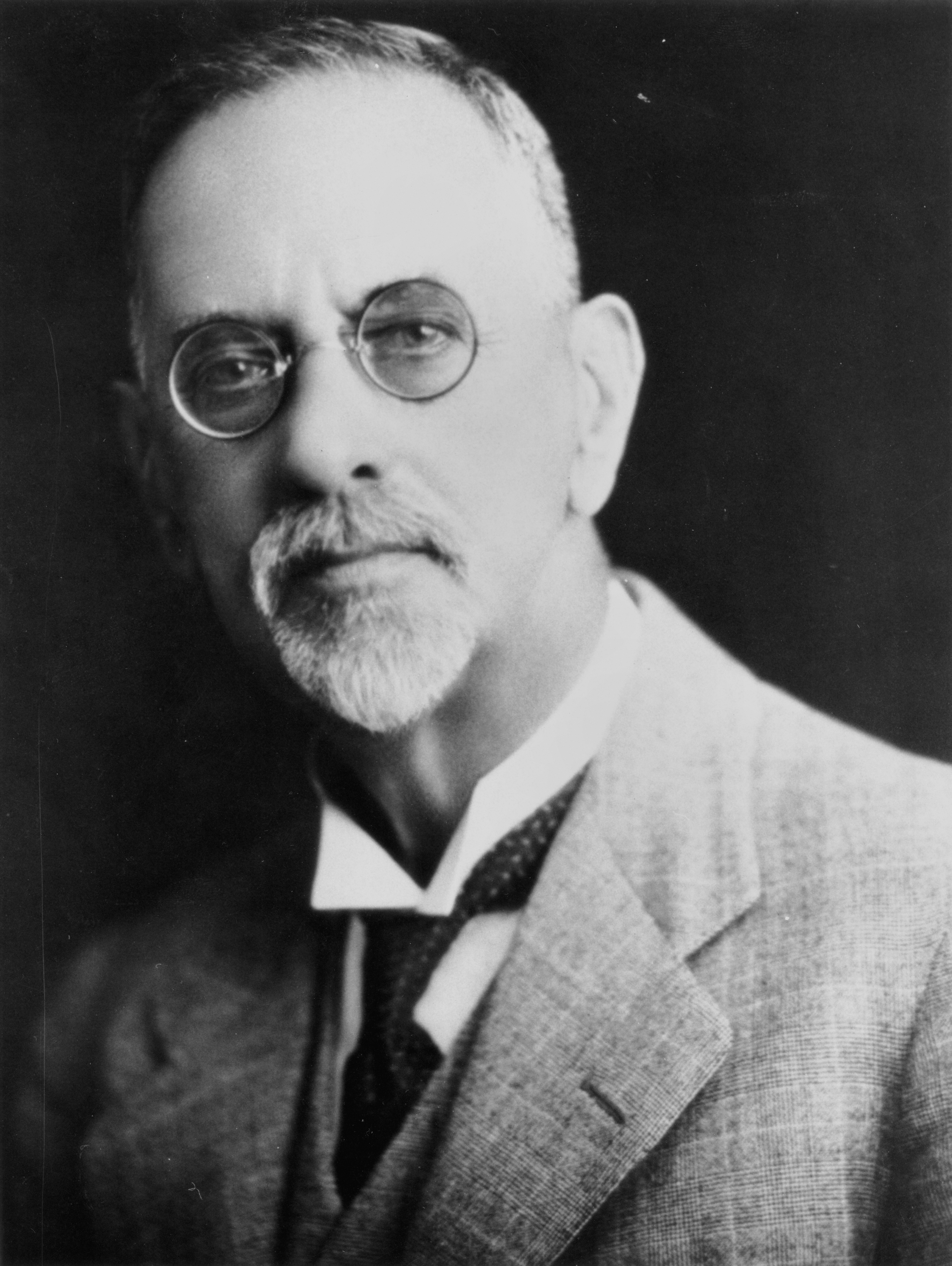
Alfred Barton Brady, architect and engineer

Alfred Barton Brady (1856–1932) was an engineer and architect in Queensland, Australia. He was one of Queensland's most important early engineers and was particularly known for his bridge design. He was the Queensland Colonial Architect and many of his buildings and structures are now heritage-listed.

== Early life ==
Alfred Barton Brady was born on 1 February 1856 in Manchester, England. He was educated in private schools.

== Architecture career ==
On 15 January 1872 at age 15, Brady commenced his training as a pupil of Charles William Green, an architect and civil engineer of Manchester and Liverpool. As Green was the official architect for the Lancashire and Yorkshire Railway, Brady gained experience working with their engineering and architecture department. From March 1879 to October 1884, Brady worked in London and other parts of England gaining experience with water supply, sewerage and drainage.

Brady immigrated to Brisbane in December 1884 and was employed by the Queensland Public Service in January 1885 and served the state in various departments for 37 years. From 1885, he worked initially for the Queensland Railway Department from 1885 and then from 1889 with the Public Works Department. He was appointed Engineer for Bridges in 1889 and then as the Queensland Colonial Architect in 1892. He was appointed Under-Secretary for the Public Works in 1901. Although Brady designed many important and handsome public buildings, his forte was bridge design and he designed a number of notable bridges.

== Later life ==
Brady retired at the end of January 1922, being forced to do so by an age restriction within the Queensland Public Service (his 66th birthday was 1 February 1922).

Brady died on 31 May 1932 in Sydney after a long illness.

== Significant works ==
- 1893: Lamington Bridge, Maryborough
- 1896: Victoria Bridge, Brisbane (now demolished apart from the Victoria Bridge Abutment)
- 1899: Kennedy Bridge, Bundaberg
- 1900: Burnett Bridge, Bundaberg
