= Victoria Bridge Abutment =

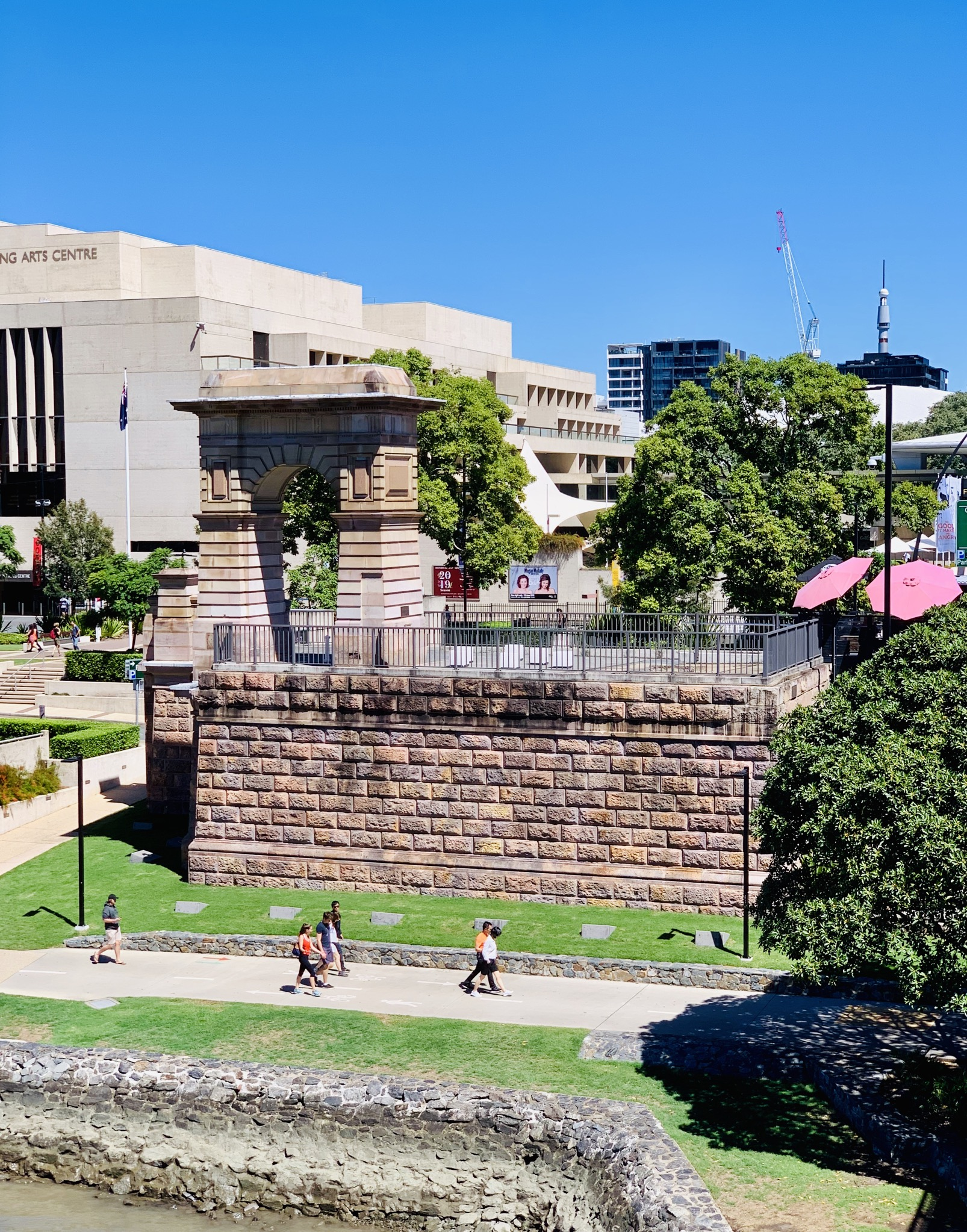
- Victoria Bridge Abutment, 2019

- Location within Queensland Location within Australia
- 27.4734°S 153.0201°E
- Location: 74 Stanley Street, South Brisbane, City of Brisbane, Queensland, Australia

History
- Design period: 1870s–1890s (late 19th century)
- Built: 1896

Site notes
- Architect: Alfred Barton Brady
- Architectural style: Classicism

Queensland Heritage Register
- Official name: Former Victoria Bridge Abutment
- Type: state heritage (built)
- Designated: 21 August 1992
- Reference no.: 600303
- Significant period: 1890s (fabric); 1896–1969 (historical existence of bridge)
- Significant components: wall/s, plaque, memorial – tablet, abutments – road bridge, tramway, bollards, furniture/fittings, archway, kerbing and channelling
- Builders: Arthur Midson

Victoria Bridge Abutment is a heritage-listed road bridge remnant at 74 Stanley Street, South Brisbane, City of Brisbane, Queensland, Australia. It was designed by Alfred Barton Brady and built in 1896 by Arthur Midson. It was added to the Queensland Heritage Register on 21 August 1992.

== History ==
The Victoria Bridge Abutment is the remnant of the fourth Victoria Bridge (the second permanent bridge) to cross the Brisbane River at this point. Constructed in 1896 to a design by A B Brady, Queensland Government Architect, the bridge was constructed of iron, with stone abutments at each end. The stonework was undertaken by Arthur Midson and the ironwork by Messrs Cormick. The abutment comprises a large masonry podium supporting a section of road and a sawn stone rusticated arch with composite neoclassical ornament. A marble memorial tablet is fixed to the southern side of the arch to commemorate an eleven-year-old Greek Australian child, Hector Vasyli, who was accidentally killed on the site in 1918 while welcoming returning soldiers. The decision to retain this portion of the bridge was a combination of the desire to retain an example of the stonework associated with the earlier bridge, and as a result of consultation with the Greek Community who wished to maintain an appropriate location for the memorial plaque for Hector Vasyli.

The 1896 bridge was the fourth structure to cross the Brisbane River at this point. The first, built from timber in 1865, was closed only two years later due to excessive damage caused by marine borers. A permanent structure was commenced in 1864, but was not completed until 1874 when it was opened by the Queensland Governor who named Victoria Bridge for the ruling British sovereign, Queen Victoria. Operating as a toll bridge until 1877 it was destroyed in the February 1893 floods. A further temporary bridge was erected by September 1893 but was again destroyed by flooding in 1896. By this time, however, the second permanent bridge was nearing completion. On 30 September 1896 the "downstream half" of the second permanent Victoria Bridge was "opened without ceremony". On 22 June 1897 (Diamond Jubilee Day) the second permanent Victoria Bridge was opened for traffic, including trams.

The opening of the first permanent Victoria Bridge in 1874 provided an important transport and communications link between the north and south banks of the river and provided further impetus to the development of the south bank. In the 1880s the south bank experienced a development boom. The South Brisbane Dry Dock was opened in 1881, coal wharves at Woolloongabba and associated rail links were established in circa 1885, and South Brisbane railway station was established as the passenger terminus for suburban and country train lines built during the 1880s. Industry and commerce was attracted to the area, and Stanley Street developed into a major retail centre and thoroughfare. The spread of housing included the development of large residences located along the ridges with views of the river and industry developed along the southern bank of Milton Reach.

South Brisbane Municipality was established in 1888. The development of the civic centre focussed on the Stanley and Vulture Street intersection and included the South Brisbane Town Hall, Post Office, Fire Station and South Brisbane railway station. A swinging span was designed to permit the passage of tall-masted ships; however even at that stage such vessels were becoming increasingly scarce and much of the up-river traffic was the lower motorised vessels. Following the introduction of tram services to South Brisbane, this "swinging girder" was closed permanently to permit the laying of tracks. The boom of the 1880s collapsed, following maritime and pastoral strikes in the early 1890s and the collapse of banks in 1893. A series of floods in 1893 resulted in the collapse of the Victoria Bridge which cut vital transport and communications links with the central city. Urban expansion continued following the opening of the new Victoria Bridge in 1897 and was further supported by the introduction of electric trams.

The significance of the Victoria Bridge to the commercial development of the south side of the river is best demonstrated in two anecdotes relating to human nature. At the opening of the bridge in 1897 both North and South Brisbane demanded that they have a ceremony to celebrate this significant event. The ceremony therefore required a formal opening on the north side, following which the party of dignitaries proceeded to cross the bridge to the southern bank. Here another ceremony was held and the procession then crossed the river once more to be met with refreshments on the north bank. The second story relates to a Commemoration Day prank perpetrated by university students in the early 1930s. Early one morning they installed a sign at each end of the bridge indicating that the bridge was closed to traffic. Police arriving on the scene took the signs at face value and proceeded to prevent vehicular traffic from using the bridge for most of the day. It was not until someone thought to check with the appropriate authorities that it was discovered that the signs were placed in position as a joke. As a consequence of this prank commerce on either side of the river was considerably disrupted and the university students were severely reprimanded for their actions.

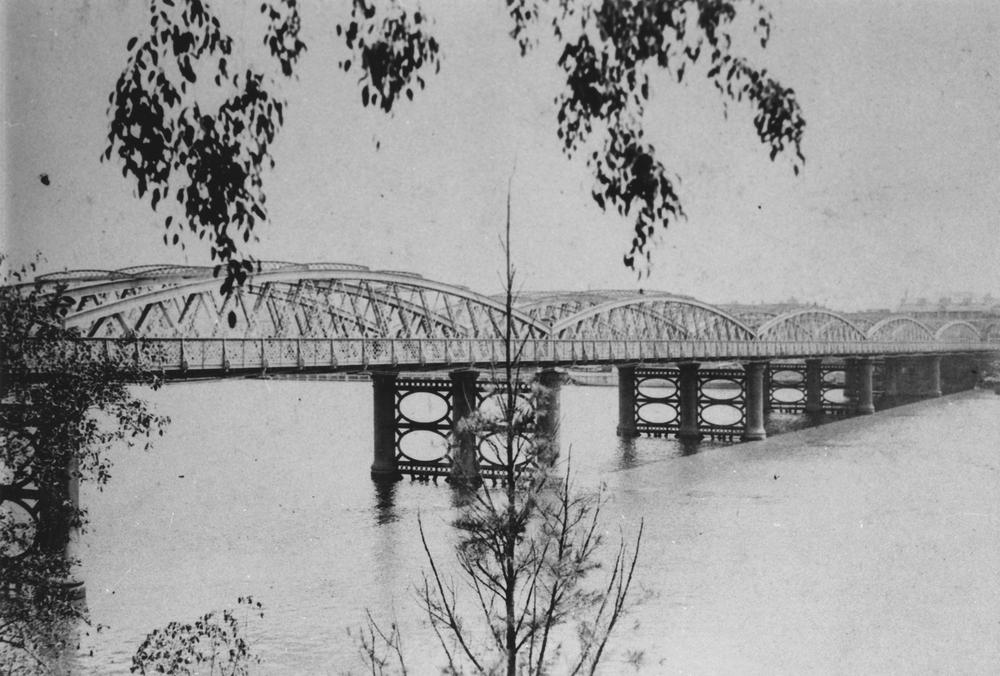
Victoria Bridge

The design of the bridge caused much comment, due to the impressive stone arches flanking the approaches and the manner in which the engineers had addressed the various problems presented by the site. The river banks were at two different levels, presenting a design challenge which was competently met by Brady. The gentle slope of the decking from the higher north bank down to the southern abutment was imperceptible to the eye. The cylindrical iron pillars which supported the span across the river were slightly tapered above normal water level. The metal material was "imported from Great Britain" and mostly (wrought and cast iron - practically everything: structure in full and superstructure all "except the cast - steel bearings") "manufactured" in situ, "in Queensland". As per the other construction materials - wood and stone - the bridge was built with local ones (with the only possible exception of the Oregon pine of the main girders). The builders worked at great depths under water and some suffered from the bends with one casualty.

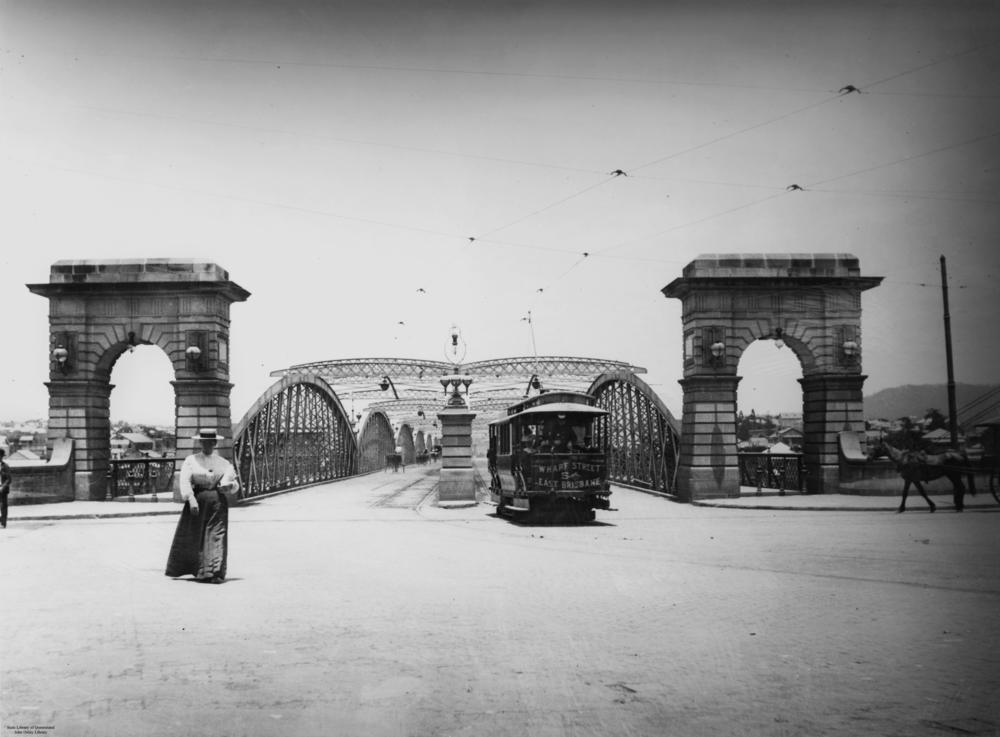
Divided carriageway, 1906

The bridge provided a divided carriageway for traffic, with two lanes operating in each direction. The central dividing structure echoed the form of the sides of the bridge, consisting of a series of metal lattice framed hog-backs. Each end of the central divider was marked with a rusticated stone pilaster topped with an ornate gas light. The sides of the bridge were also enclosed in lattice trussing. Each end of the bridge was provided with stone pillars at the river bank and, at the point of entry, stone arches spanned the pedestrian walkways. Pedestrian footways were provided either side of the main decking. Until the 1930s the Victoria Bridge remained the only permanent crossing point between the north and south banks of the Brisbane River within Brisbane. By 1926 the bottleneck caused by the increased volume of traffic attempting to use the only river crossing in the city led to the establishment of a commission to explore alternative sites for bridges. After consideration of a number of factors such as flooding, navigation and level of demand, the William Jolly Bridge was constructed, followed by the Walter Taylor Bridge at Indooroopilly which functioned as a toll bridge from its opening in 1936. The Story Bridge was not opened until 1940 due to pressures against the construction of a down-river bridge which had the potential to limit shipping to the city wharves.

In 1918, during the celebrations marking the end of World War I and the return of the soldiers from the front, an incident occurred that touched the heart of the public and led to the provision of a memorial tablet on the southern end of the bridge. An 11-year-old child, Hector Vasyli, of Greek ancestry, was struck by one of the vehicles in the parade and killed. A marble tablet was erected to his memory and a memorial service has been held at the site on Anzac Day ever since.

In 1969 when the bridge was being demolished, to be replaced by the present structure, the memorial tablet was removed for safekeeping until a suitable location was found for it. Discussion with the Greek Community and Brisbane City Council led to the decision to retain that portion of the abutment which had originally held the memorial tablet and so it was returned to its original location on 24 April 1970. During storage the bronze relief head of the boy which decorated the tablet was lost. The Greek Consul, Mr Alex Freeleagus located the boys' sister in Sydney and she provided a photograph of the boy from which a replacement likeness was cast.

The bridge abutment was left as a ruin for some time following the demolition of the bridge, photographs taken in 1971 show that it was still in a ruined state at that time. Restoration work is reported as having been undertaken as a part of the revivification of the south bank area in preparation for the World Expo 88 which was held at South Bank Parklands. At that time two bronze plaques were attached to the side of the abutment recording the history of the bridge.

== Description ==
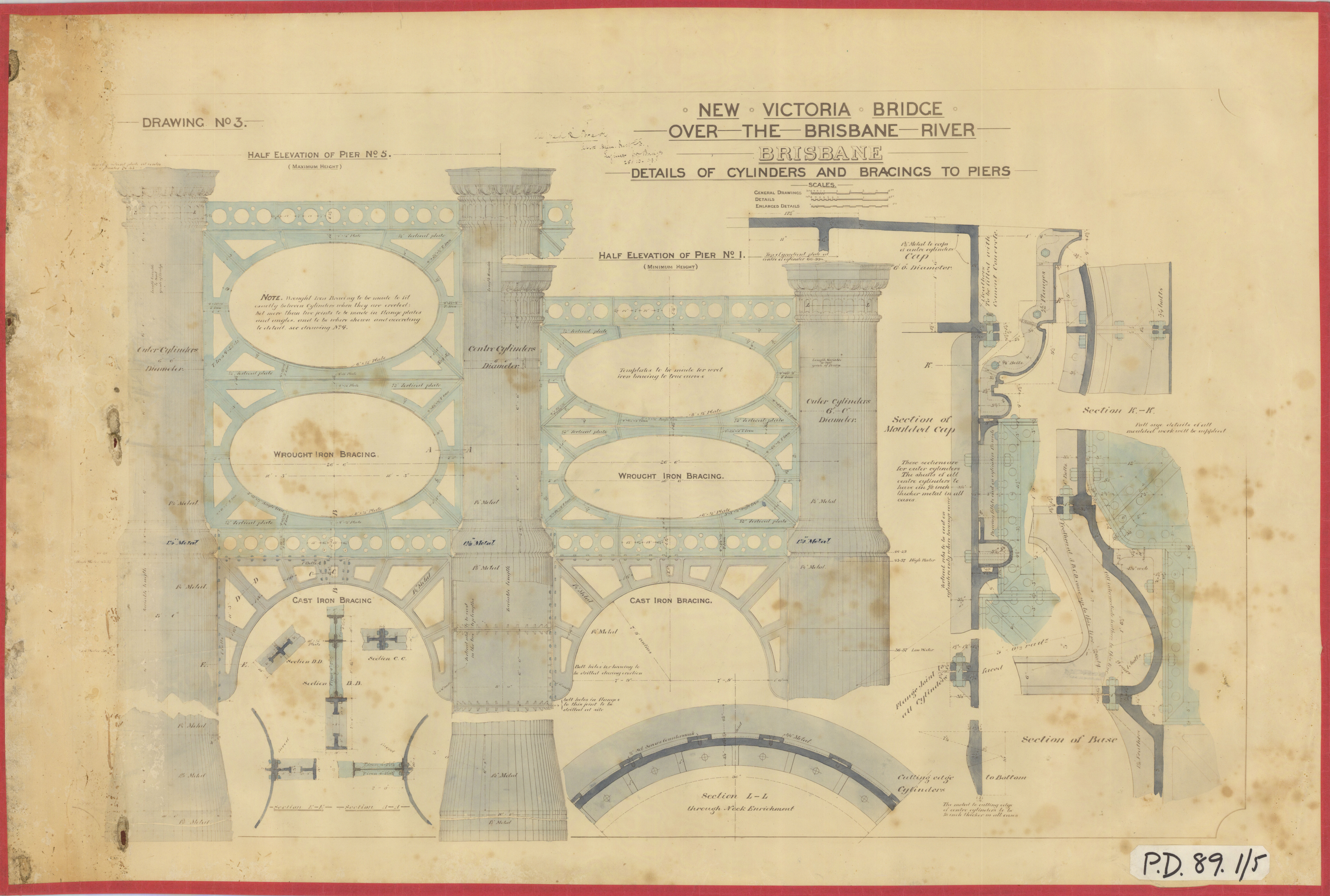
Architectural plans of cylinders & bracings to piers, 1893

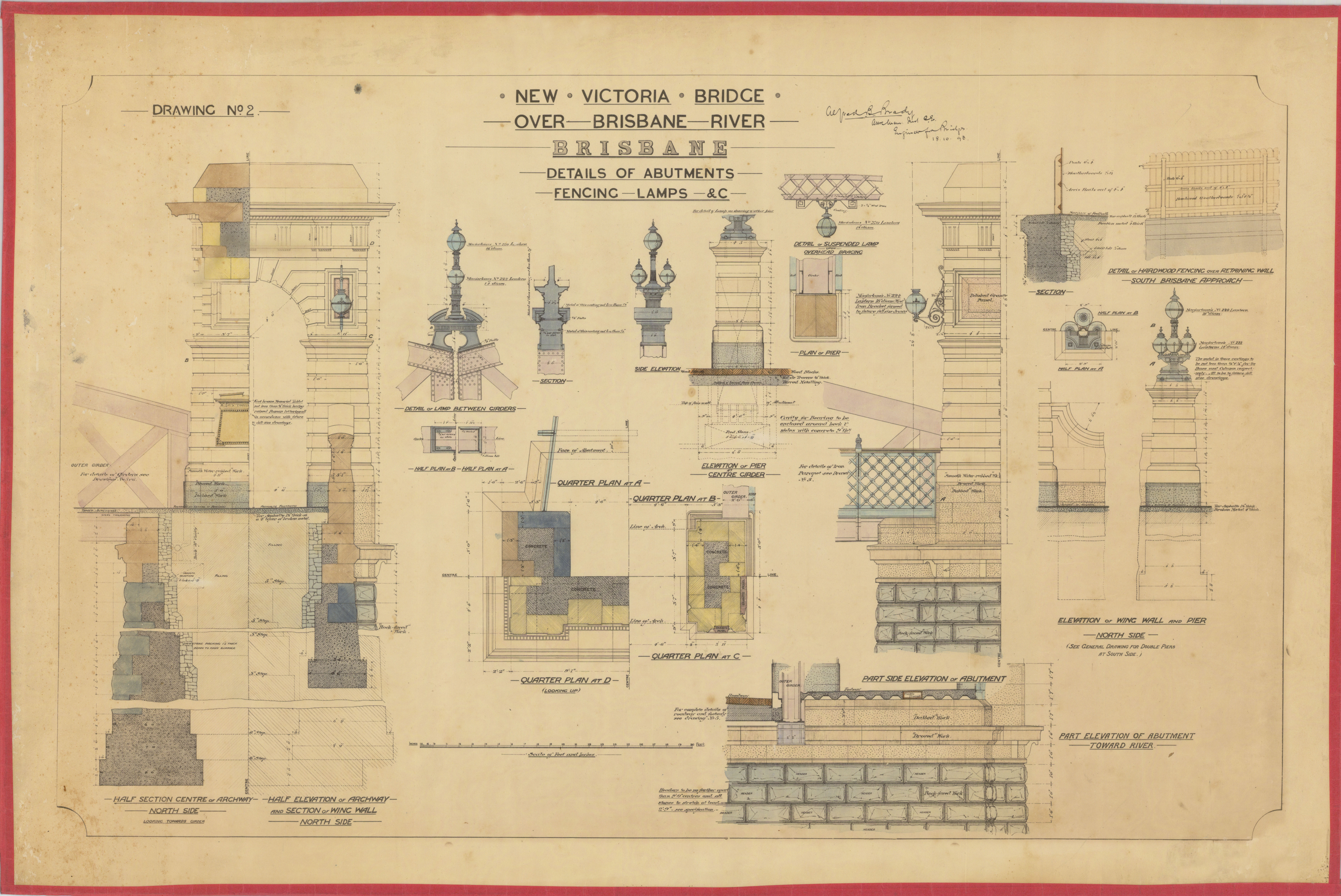
Architectural plans of abutments, fencing, lamps, archway etc., 1893

The Victoria Bridge Abutment stands on the southern side of the Brisbane River downstream of the existing Victoria bridge. It consists of a large stone podium with rock-faced ashlar facing. The upriver side is faced with polygonal masonry, indicating that it is newer stonework. The podium is capped with the downstream arch of the southern abutment, together with a section of roadway which retains the tracks of the tramway.

The entry to each pedestrian footway was defined with a rusticated arch of sawn stone which combines both Classical and Egyptian vocabularies. The pylons supporting the arch are tapered towards the base of the arch from which they continue as attached pilasters with parallel sides. The arch springs from a cornice at the top of the tapered portion of the supporting pylons. Above the arch a cornice defines the base of a Doric frieze which continues around the tops of the attached pilasters. The entablature is topped with another cornice. Either side of the arch a granite tablet is applied which supports ornate metal brackets which held gas lamps to illuminate the entry to the bridge. A similar tablet is located on the sides of the structure at the same level. The three lowest courses have been treated with a "rockfaced" surface. The outer pylon of the arch is continued to the base of the abutment as a low profile pilaster with a rock-faced surface.

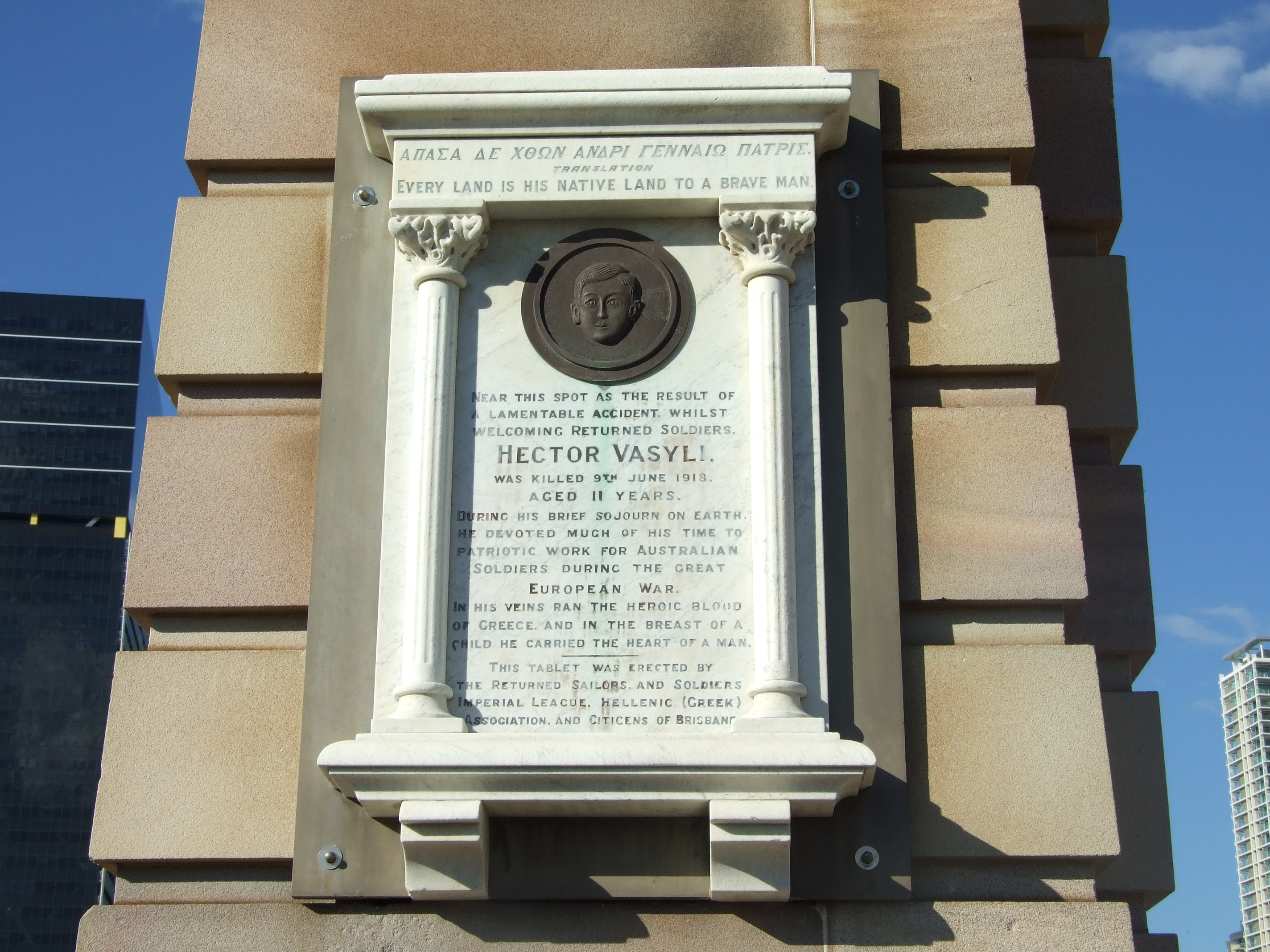
Hector Vasyli Memorial

At the centre of the arch, galvanised piping projects and a section hangs parallel with the face of the structure. A marble tablet is applied to the landward side of the up-river pylon below the lowest cornice, commemorating Hector Vasyli. The tablet is in the form of an aedicule in the Corinthian style. The inscription on the entablature reads: "EVERY LAND IS HIS NATIVE LAND TO A BRAVE MAN"

The Corinthian columns frame a tondo beneath which the inscription continues. The tondo contains a bronze relief portrait of the boy facing outward. Below this lies the body of the inscription. The inscription reads:

NEAR THIS SPOT AS THE RESULT OF A LAMENTABLE ACCIDENT, WHILST WELCOMING RETURNED SOLDIERS

HECTOR VASYLI WAS KILLED 9TH JUNE 1918 AGED 11 YEARS. DURING HIS BRIEF SOJOURN ON EARTH, HE DEVOTED MUCH OF HIS TIME TO PATRIOTIC WORK FOR AUSTRALIAN SOLDIERS DURING THE GREAT EUROPEAN WAR. IN HIS VEINS RAN THE HEROIC BLOOD OF GREECE, AND IN THE BREAST OF A CHILD HE CARRIED THE HEART OF A MAN. THIS TABLET WAS ERECTED BY THE RETURNED SAILORS, AND SOLDIERS IMPERIAL LEAGUE, HELLENIC (GREEK) ASSOCIATION AND CITIZENS OF BRISBANE

The stylobate is supported on two brackets of marble.

Below the tablet two rows of metal hooks are attached to the stonework. These may be intended for the support of commemorative wreaths relating to the Anzac Day memorial services. Off centre from the entrance to the arch, a metal bollard remains in situ.

Upriver from the arch a section of roadway remains, bearing sections of tramline. Between the two sets of tracks the remains of a low concrete platform with a rounded end has been left in situ. The surface to the landward side of this platform retains painted chevron markings. On the downriver side a low stone wall curves out, terminating in a low pilaster which defines the entry point for the bridge. The area is paved in bitumen. Metal brackets are attached to the stonework of the pylons, the centre of the arch and on the top of the outer pilaster; fittings for a gas illumination. Curved stone kerbing defines the footpath from the road way. The white marble memorial tablet is situated on the landward side of the up-river pylon of the arch.

The abutment is isolated from its original context as the approach road and bridge decking are no longer in place. Additional stabilising footings and retaining works have been constructed to maintain the abutment in its present location. All the stonework below the road level is done in rock-cut masonry. Other additions include a white safety railing around the perimeter which matches the railing of the neighbouring bridge, and a flight of metal and concrete stairs to permit access to the platform of the abutment. Two bronze plaques have been applied to the stonework, one at each landing of the stairway. The inscriptions show a number of inaccuracies, however are transcribed below:

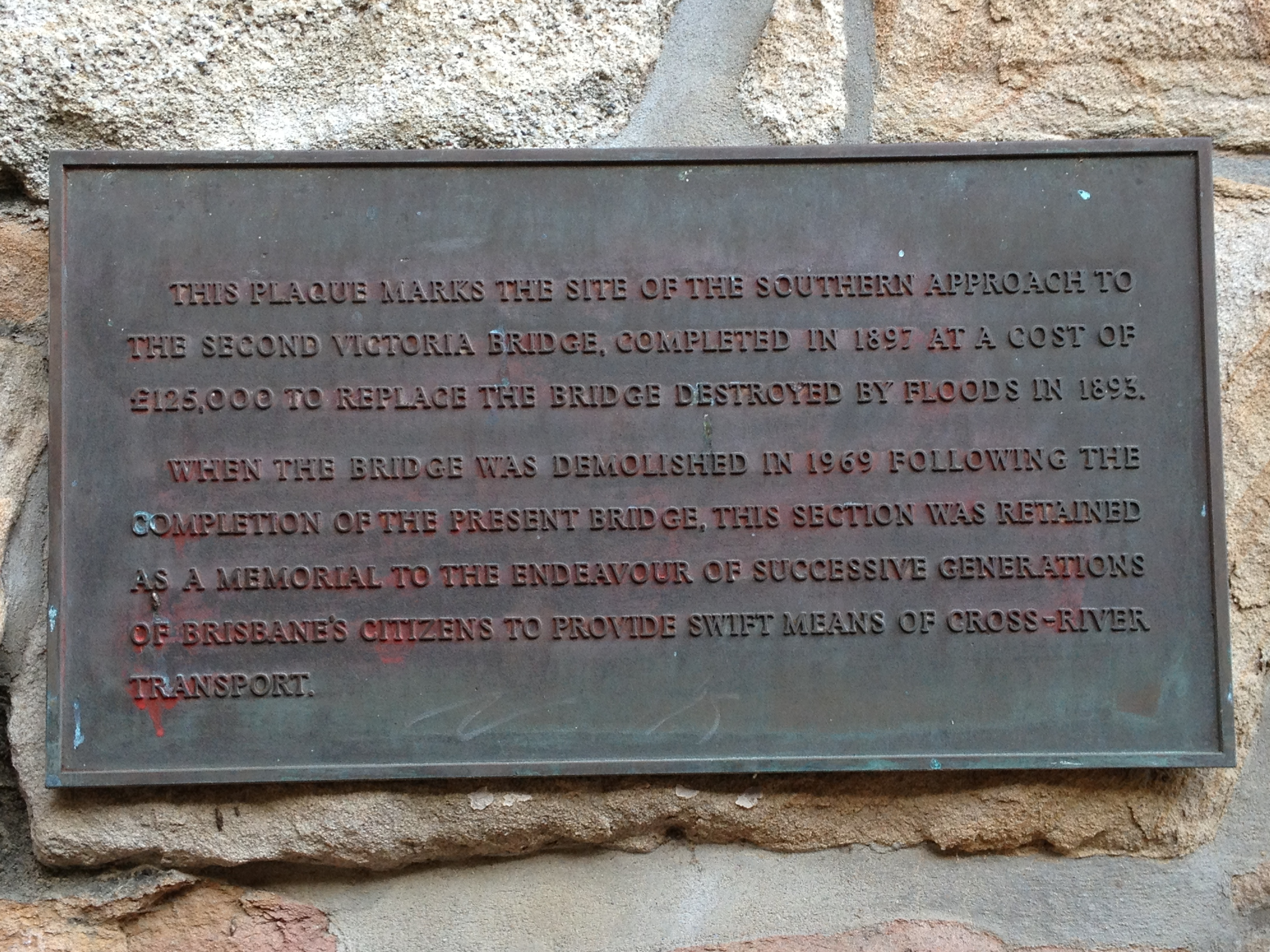
Plaque, ground level, 2013

Plaque one - ground level "This plaque marks the site of the southern approach to the second Victoria Bridge, completed in 1897 at a cost of £125,000 to replace the bridge destroyed by floods in 1896. When the bridge was demolished in 1969, following the completion of the present bridge, this section was retained as a memorial to the endeavour of successive generations of Brisbane's citizens to provide swift means of cross-river transport."

Plaque two - first landing "This stonework is all that remains of the first permanent bridge to span the Brisbane River. A temporary wooden structure was erected in 1865 as staging for the permanent bridge, but was closed to traffic from Nov 1897 as a result of flood damage. On the 15th June 1874 the new bridge was opened and named Victoria Bridge. The northern section of the Victoria Bridge collapsed on 6 February 1893 under pressure from debris during the disastrous flood of that year."

== Heritage listing ==
Former Victoria Bridge Abutment was listed on the Queensland Heritage Register on 21 August 1992 having satisfied the following criteria.

The place is important in demonstrating the evolution or pattern of Queensland's history.

The Victoria Bridge Abutment stands as a memorial of the first permanent bridge to be constructed across the Brisbane River which did not succumb to the forces of nature. The opening of the bridge in 1897 provided a major boost to the continued development of the City of South Brisbane which had first received its development impetus from the introduction of cross-river transport provided by the previous bridges at this location.

The place has potential to yield information that will contribute to an understanding of Queensland's history.

The manner of the design reflects the aesthetic values of Brisbane's early public structures and provides information regarding the manner in which the engineering challenges of the site were addressed.

The place is important because of its aesthetic significance.

The manner of the design reflects the aesthetic values of Brisbane's early public structures and provides information regarding the manner in which the engineering challenges of the site were addressed.

The place has a strong or special association with a particular community or cultural group for social, cultural or spiritual reasons.

The Victoria Bridge Abutment has a high social value for the Greek community of Brisbane, containing as it does, the memorial to Hector Vasyli, a young Greek Australian boy who died while demonstrating his loyalty to his adopted homeland. This association is further demonstrated by the role of the Greek community in ensuring that this portion of the bridge was retained to provide a fitting location for the memorial plaque erected in the memory of the Vasyli boy and the continued practice of conducting a memorial service for the boy each Anzac Day.

The place has a special association with the life or work of a particular person, group or organisation of importance in Queensland's history.

The elegance of this remaining portion serves as a reminder of the grace and style of the substantial structure designed by A B Brady, Government Architect.
