= Capsize of the ferry Pearl =

1896 disaster in Australia

Coordinates: 27.4771°S 153.0242°E

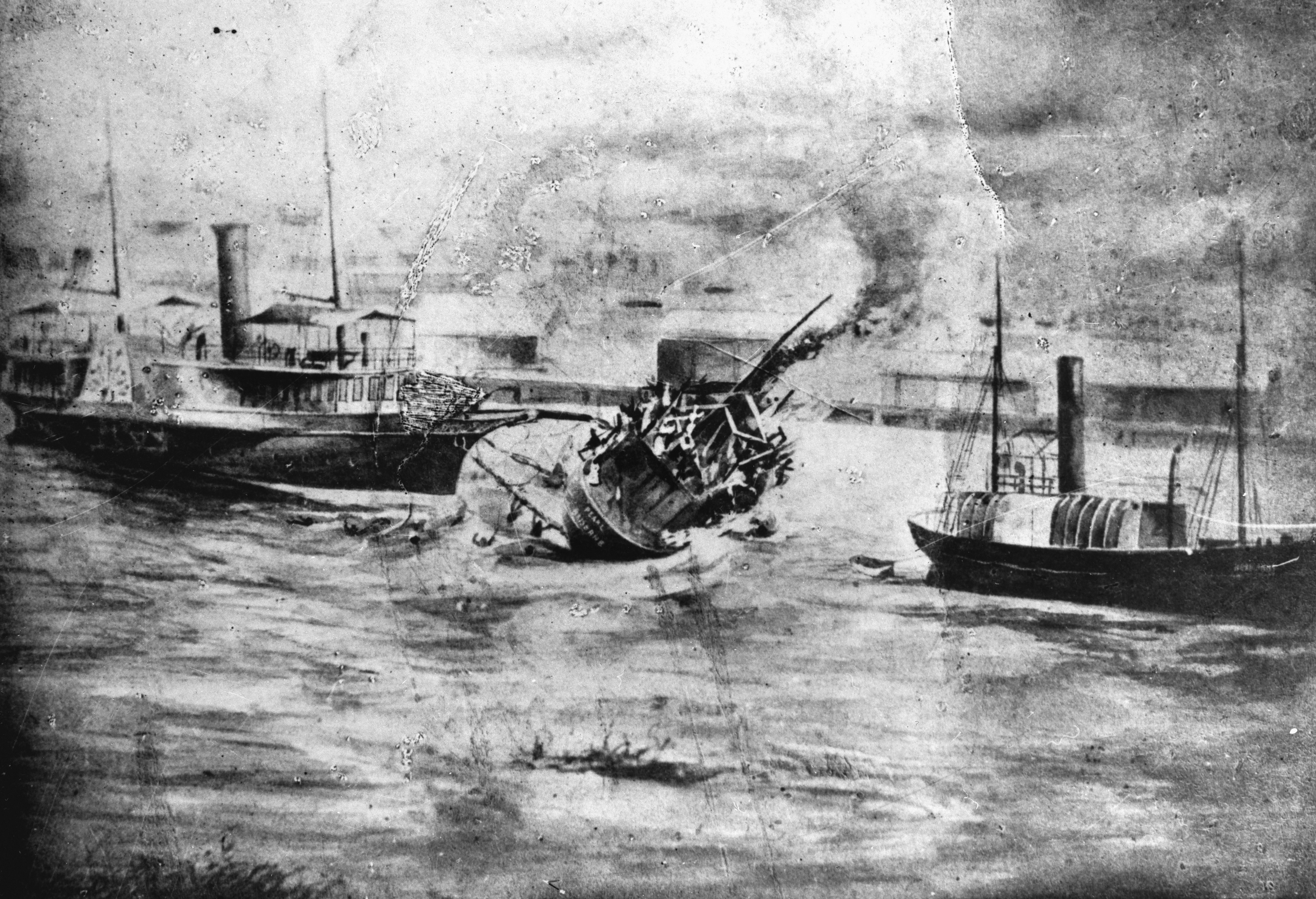
Pearl ferry capsizing

The capsize of the ferry Pearl occurred on Thursday 13 February 1896 in the Brisbane River, Queensland, Australia. It was estimated that half of the 80–100 people on board the ferry died.

== Background ==
The ferry was in use as a temporary measure due to the loss of both bridges that crossed the river, the Victoria Bridge and the Albert Railway Bridge, at Indooroopilly after the floods of 1893. Steamers like Pearl were then commissioned to transfer traffic across the river between Brisbane's Queen's Wharf and Musgrave Wharf.

The ferry was described as such:

The Pearl was a wooden screw-steamer of ten horse-power and forty-one tons register, gross. Her dimensions were: 58.7ft long, 15.1ft beam, and 5.1ft depth, and she was built in New South Wales in 1883. She had been engaged in the river trade, and between Brisbane and Redland Bay, and was formerly running between Brisbane and Humpybong. The vessel was built with an upper and lower deck, and was licensed to carry about 120 passengers in the river.

== Accident ==
On the afternoon of the disaster, at around 5pm, Pearl was re-crossing the river, which was flowing more strongly than usual due to floodwaters. To avoid a collision with another ship, Normanby, the captain cut power but the ferry was pushed downriver into the anchor chain of Lucinda, a government steam yacht anchored mid-river.

The hull breached and the ferry quickly capsized, drowning those below deck and throwing those on deck into the water, resulting in the death of many of the 80–100 people believed to be on board.

Nearby small boats, including those from other ferries and one from Lucinda, raced to the site and rescued around 40 survivors, some of whom clung to the anchor chain, life buoys, or wreckage.

== Aftermath ==
In order to salvage bodies, diving operations were also undertaken in the river. Others retrieved bodies down river in the following weeks. The ship was later raised from the river on 6 March 1896.

An inquest was later held into the accident with blame focusing on the captain, James Chard (who survived), who may have been drinking. Chard had his certificates and licences to pilot steamers cancelled following the inquest.
