= Burnett Bridge =

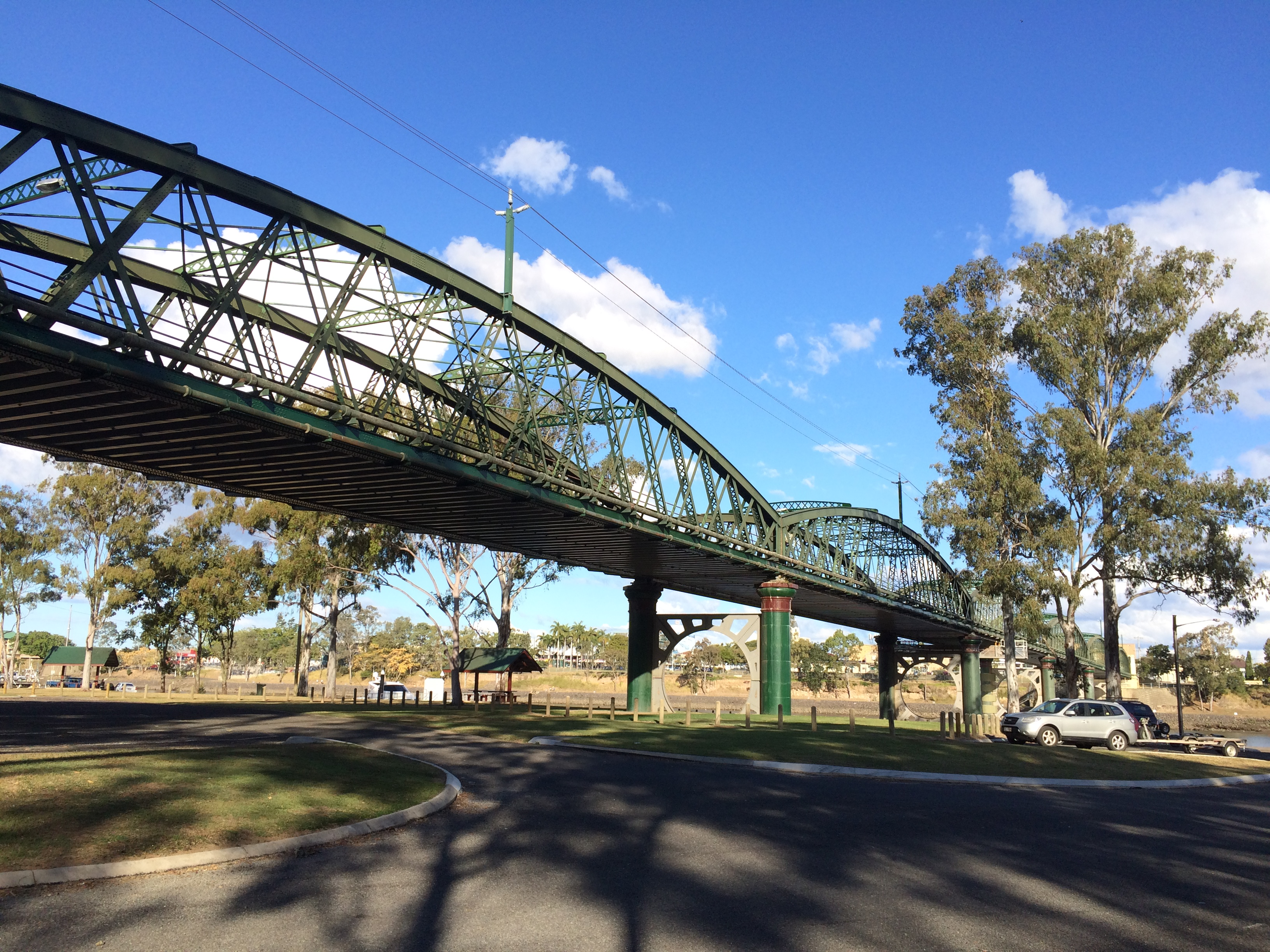
- Burnett Bridge, 2015

- Location within Queensland Location within Australia
- 24.8627°S 152.3458°E
- Location: from Quay Street, Bundaberg Central to Perry Street, Bundaberg North, Bundaberg, Bundaberg Region, Queensland, Australia

History
- Design period: 1900–1914 (early 20th century)
- Built: 1900–1900

Site notes
- Architect: Alfred Barton Brady
- Architectural style: Classicism

Queensland Heritage Register
- Official name: Burnett Bridge, Burnett River Traffic Bridge
- Type: state heritage (built)
- Designated: 21 October 1992
- Reference no.: 600368
- Significant period: 1900s (fabric)
- Significant components: wall/s, pier/s (bridge), abutments – road bridge, post/s – lamp, pylon/s

Burnett Bridge is a heritage-listed road bridge crossing the Burnett River from Quay Street, Bundaberg Central to Perry Street, Bundaberg North in Bundaberg, Bundaberg Region, Queensland, Australia. It was designed by Alfred Barton Brady and built in 1900. It is also known as Burnett River Traffic Bridge. It was added to the Queensland Heritage Register on 21 October 1992.

== History ==
The Burnett Bridge is a metal truss road bridge spanning the Burnett River at Bundaberg, linking the northern and southern parts of the city. It was constructed in 1900 to the design of A.B. Brady.

The Burnett area was first settled by Europeans in the 1840s and 1850s as a series of pastoral runs. In the late 1860s, as good agricultural land around Maryborough began to be scarce, agriculturalists and timbergetters became interested in land on the navigable Burnett River to the north. The foundation settlers of Bundaberg selected land in 1867–68 under the "Sugar and Coffee Regulations" stemming from the Crown Lands Alienation Act of 1860s which aimed to promote agriculture and closer settlement. The site of Bundaberg was officially surveyed in 1869. Coastal traffic grew, and copper was first mined at Mt Perry in 1871, which enabled Bundaberg to develop as a port and supply centre, in spite of competition from Maryborough for this trade. The provision of amenities was therefore of importance to the development of Bundaberg and this included bridges because, although the higher southern bank of the river was officially surveyed as the town site, both sides soon developed wharves and buildings and were initially linked by ferry. In the 1870s the first bridges were built as ferries could no longer cope with increasing traffic across the river. It was in the 1880s, however, with the establishment of the sugar industry in the region, that Bundaberg boomed. Handsome and substantial masonry buildings began to rise in the city as evidence of its growing importance and prosperity.

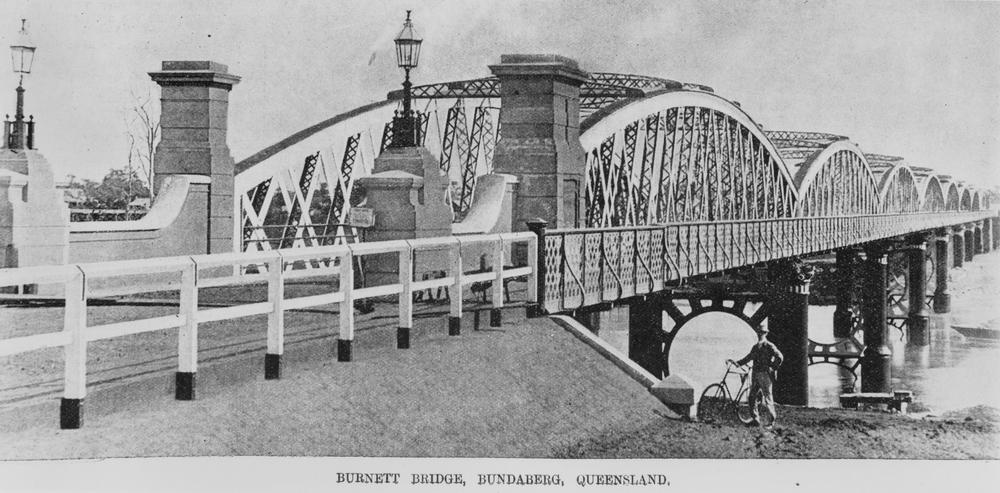
Burnett Bridge, 1900

The first bridges were timber and became weakened by heavy traffic. Two more substantial metal replacements, not only capable of taking heavier loads, but of matching the general upgrading of Bundaberg's commercial centre were planned. The smaller of the two, over Bundaberg Creek, a tributary of the Burnett River and the eastern boundary of the city, was opened in December 1899, and is known as the Kennedy Bridge. It is a reduced version of the main bridge which was opened on 24 August 1900. Both have similarities in structural design and appearance to the 1897 Victoria Bridge in Brisbane, which was demolished in the 1960s. All were designed by engineer and Queensland Government Architect, Alfred Barton Brady.

A.B. Brady, born and trained in England, designed many notable bridges and was one of Queensland's most important early engineers. He served the state for 37 years from 1885, at first with the railways, then from 1889 with the Public Works Department, and then as Government Architect and engineer for bridges from 1892. Although Brady designed many important and handsome public buildings, his forte was in bridge design.

When it was opened the Burnett Bridge was the fifth longest metal truss bridge in Australia. Of the others, all have been demolished or decommissioned. Although the trusses of the Burnett Bridge were almost identical to those of the Victoria Bridge, those of the Brisbane bridge had a wider roadway divided into two portions running between three trusses, whereas Burnett Bridge has only two trusses.

Although the river had been bridged by the Burnett railway bridge in 1891, the traffic bridge was viewed by the public as being of great importance for the continuing progress of Bundaberg. This was demonstrated by public meetings held to support the building of the bridge and the participation of local authorities in its building. It was completed at a time when funds for local authorities were scarce because of priority given by the government to developmental railways. Half the cost was met by endowment; the other half was advanced to the local authorities as a loan repayable in forty years.

At some stage the lanterns on the abutments of the bridge were replaced by spherical lights, possibly when a conversion was made from gas to electricity. In the 1950s, the footway was narrowed, but changes have otherwise been minor. The bridge is still an important part of the city's transport system and was repaired and repainted in 1991. In 1993, the footway was again widened as a cycleway/footpath, using improved access provided by a pathway constructed beneath the southern abutment.

== Description ==
Burnett Bridge joins Quay Street, Bundaberg with Perry Street, North Bundaberg, across the Burnett River. It is 414.5 m (1360 ft) in length and has eight 51.8 m (170 ft) long spans with cylindrical piers and concrete abutments. The bridge carries a 7.3 metres (24 ft) roadway and a footpath. The road is on transverse metal troughing spanning between the lower chords of hog-back lattice trusses.

Although the form of the bridge is principally dictated by technical requirements, it also has aesthetic appeal and is an important landmark in the city. The spans of the bridge are supported by pairs of piers in the form of Tuscan order columns with circular cross bracing between them producing a striking effect.

The bridge is approached by classically inspired abutments and pylons cast in concrete. The pylons flanking the roadway are square in form and have Doric style entablatures on rusticated bases. A concrete wall falling in height links them to the lower abutments. These carry decorative metal lamps, consisting of glass spheres lights on wrought metal bases.

== Heritage listing ==
Burnett Bridge was listed on the Queensland Heritage Register on 21 October 1992 having satisfied the following criteria.

The place is important in demonstrating the evolution or pattern of Queensland's history.

Burnett Bridge is important in illustrating the importance and prosperity of Bundaberg in the late 19th and early 20th centuries as the centre of one of Queensland's most significant sugar-growing regions.

The place is important in demonstrating the principal characteristics of a particular class of cultural places.

It is an important example of its type and combines technical quality with aesthetic appeal, making a substantial contribution to the Bundaberg townscape.

The place is important because of its aesthetic significance.

It is an important example of its type and combines technical quality with aesthetic appeal, making a substantial contribution to the Bundaberg townscape.

The place has a special association with the life or work of a particular person, group or organisation of importance in Queensland's history.

It is important as a major example of the work of Alfred Barton Brady who, during 37 years of work for several departments of the Queensland government, made a major contribution to the development of the state in both architecture and engineering design.
