= 1893 Brisbane flood =

Floods in Queensland, Australia

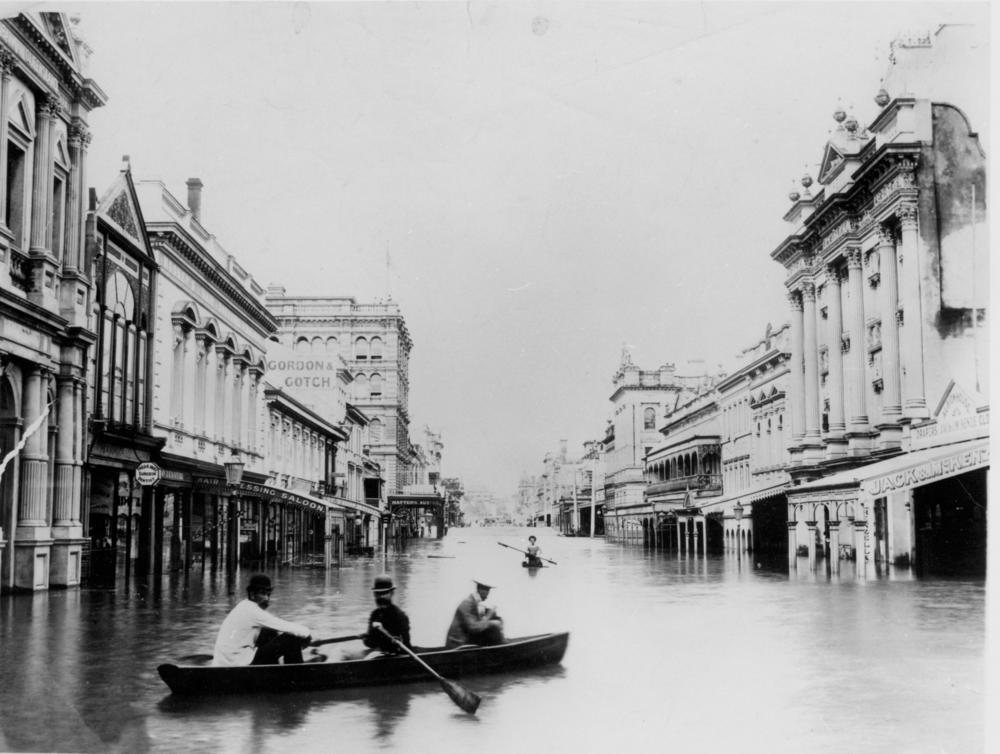
Queen Street, one of the major roads in Brisbane, after the 1893 floods. Residents are seen rowing boats to move about due to the flooding.

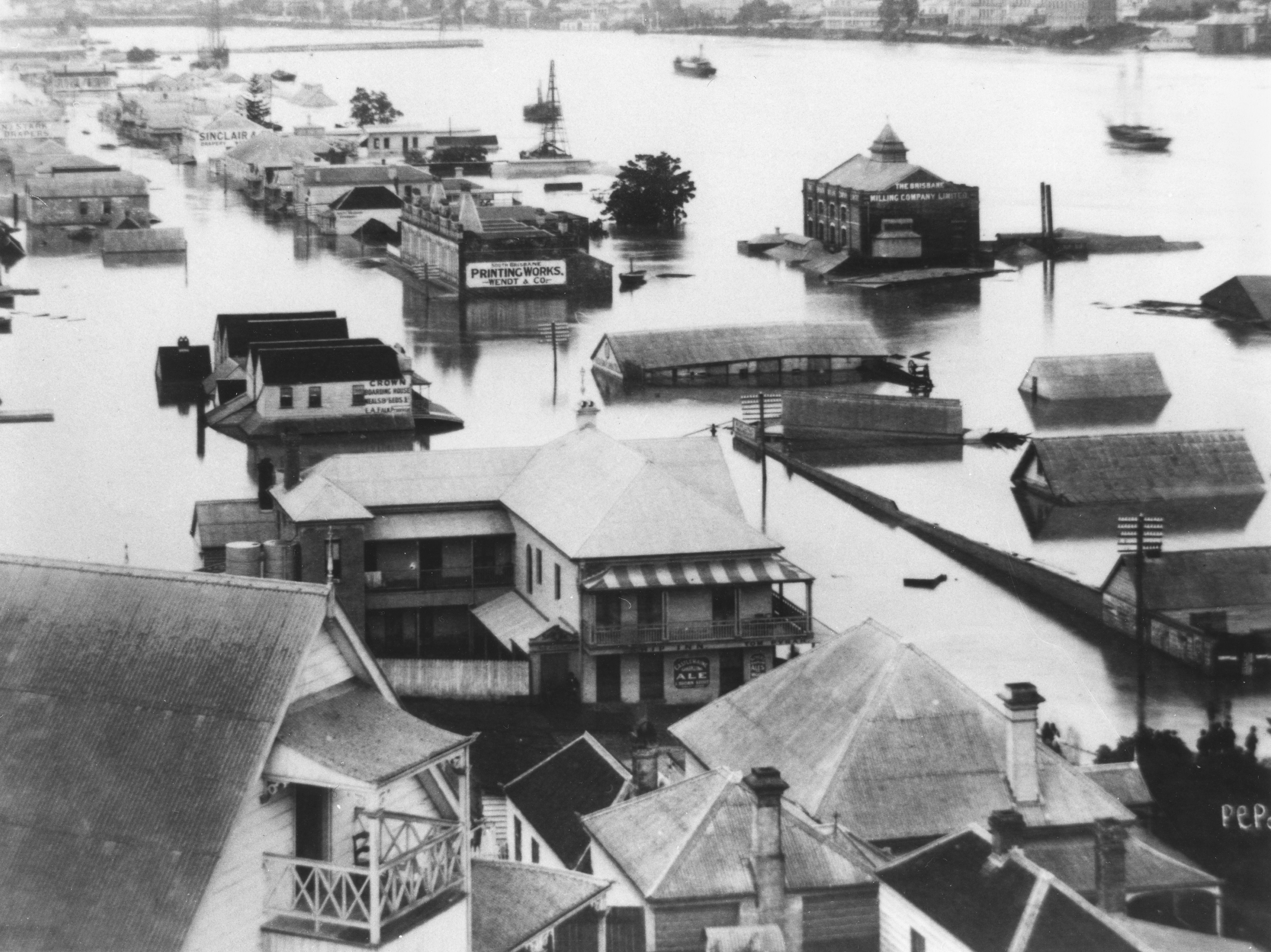
South Brisbane during the 1893 flood.

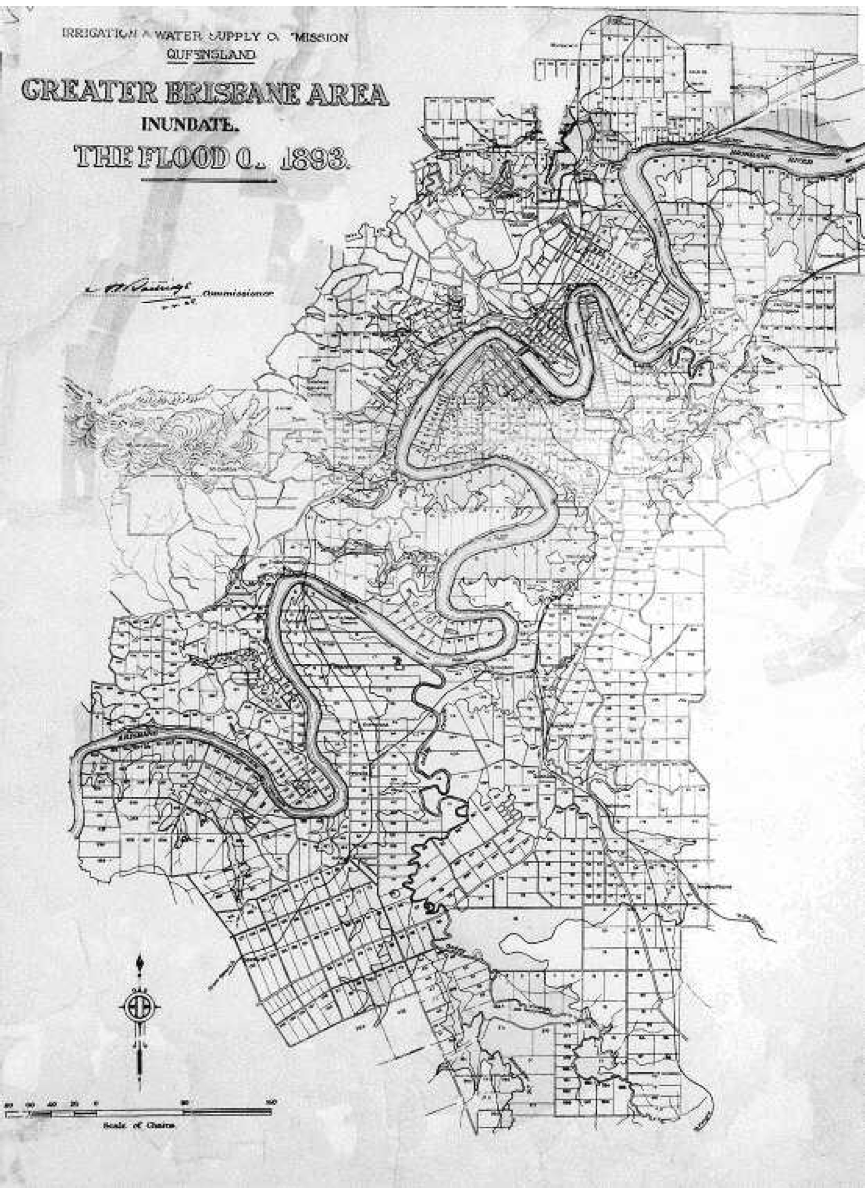
Map from the Irrigation and Water Supply Commission.

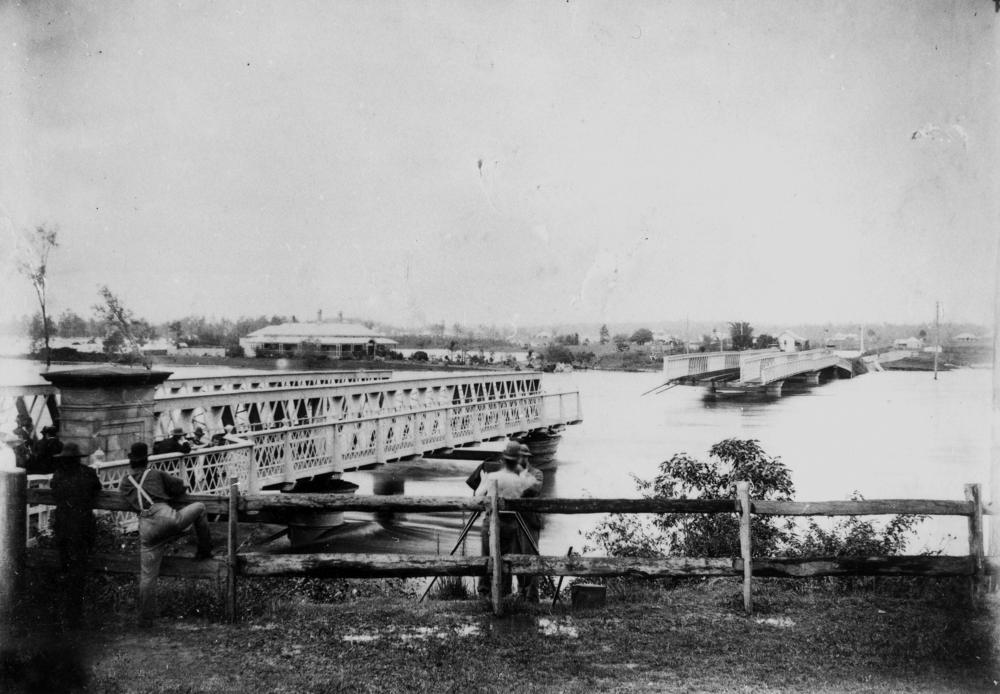
Albert Bridge

The 1893 Brisbane flood, occasionally referred to as the Great Flood of 1893 or the Black February flood, occurred in 1893 in Brisbane, Queensland, Australia. The Brisbane River burst its banks on three occasions in February 1893. It was the occurrence of three major floods in the same month that saw the period named "Black February". There was also a fourth flood later in the same year in June. The river runs through the centre of Brisbane with much of the population living in areas beside the river. It first flooded on 6 February 1893 due to a deluge associated with a tropical cyclone, called "Buninyong".

The second cyclone struck on 11 February 1893, causing relatively minor flooding compared to the first flood. When the third cyclone came on 19 February 1893, it was almost as devastating as the first, and it left up to one third of Brisbane's residents homeless. This time however the flood in the Brisbane River was largely from waters from the upper reaches of Brisbane River, rather than the Stanley River. The 1893 floods caused 35 deaths.

For the first flood, Crohamhurst recorded an all-time Australian record of 907 millimetres (35.7 in) of rain in a 24-hour period. The water surge was recorded on the Port Office gauge (now the City gauge) as being 8.35 metres (27 feet, 5 inches) above the low tide level. The February 1893 floods were the second and third highest water levels ever recorded at the City gauge, the highest being the January 1841 flood at 8.43 metres (27 feet, 8 inches).

The 1893 floods were preceded by two notable yet less severe floods in 1887 and 1890. Both were caused by high levels of summer rainfall; however the rainfall around this period (with the exception of the two summers) was described as "very low".

== Historical context ==
Brisbane was established in 1825 as a convict settlement as part of the British colony of New South Wales, and by 1842 opened to free settlement. Queensland became a self-governing colony in 1859.

Samuel Griffith was the Premier of Queensland during the Black February period, although in March 1893 (shortly after the floods) he resigned in order to join the Supreme Court of Queensland. Thomas McIlwraith then became Premier of Queensland. In 1901 the Commonwealth of Australia was formed, at which time Queensland became a State.

Brisbane in 1891 had a population of 84,000 people. The area was under the jurisdiction of several local governments (the present City of Brisbane being formed by their amalgamation in 1925). John McMaster was Mayor of Brisbane Municipal Council, which contained the City Centre, and was the most important of the local government authorities.

== Damage ==
The total damage caused by the flooding has been estimated at A$4 million (1893 figures), although no official figures exist. The southern regions of the city were most affected by the flood. The most flooded suburb of what was to become the City of Brisbane was Rocklea. However it only housed a small village and farms at that time.

Both of the bridges that crossed the river, the Victoria Bridge and the Albert Bridge at Indooroopilly were destroyed. The Victoria Bridge, which was an iron bridge with a turning span to allow traffic to go upriver, was partially destroyed on Monday 6 February 1893, when the northern half of the bridge was washed away. It was not replaced until 1897. In the meantime, ferries were used to transport people and goods across the busy river. This, however, led to the capsize of the ferry Pearl disaster in 1896 with the loss of more than 40 lives.

The great advances in technology associated with photography meant that there were many photos taken of the floods, some of which still exist today. A local businessman who would later become Premier, Robert Philp had a photo album (a very expensive item at the time) of the floods, which survives today.

== Casualties ==
The flooding was responsible for around 35 deaths. The floods also forced the hospitalisation of 190 residents.

=== Ipswich Coal Mine disaster ===
Seven of the victims were workers at John Wright's Eclipse colliery in north Ipswich which was flooded on Saturday 4 February by the Bremer River, a tributary of the Brisbane River. The seven miners killed included Thomas Wright (Mine Manager) and George Wright who were both sons of the owner. The other five miners were Andrew Smart, Patrick McQuade, John McQuade (son of Patrick), Charles Walker, and Mathew Cuthbertson. The lease over the mine was nearly expired so the mine was not in operation, but the men were removing rails and other mine equipment for use elsewhere. The colliery had two tunnels, and the flood waters had already reached the works. Thomas Wright, despite his father's advice against going down into the mine, arranged for seven men to go into the main tunnel and three men to go into the minor tunnel. Without warning, the roof collapsed over part of the main tunnel with air forced out of the mine in a great rush hurling wagons out of the way and trapping all seven men who entered the main tunnel. The men signaled the engine driver on the surface to pull them out but the collapse was major enough to prevent rescue. In minutes water had flooded the works and those not killed in the collapse would have drowned.

== Early warning signs of the 1st and 3rd floods ==
The Indigenous people used to build their camps on higher ground along the rivers, aware of the dangers of floods. They had warned the free settlers of the potential threat of floods, but their advice was ignored and settlements were built closer to the banks of the rivers.

Henry Plantagenet Somerset (1852–1936), was a landowner in the area where the Stanley River and the Upper Brisbane River meet. He built a homestead called "Caboonbah" on the cliffs above the river, where he lived with his wife, Katherine Rose Somerset (1855–1935). Caboonbah meant "big rock" in the local indigenous language, and it was built 60 feet (18 metres) higher than the rock cliff (Weldon's Knob) which was the location of the previous highest flood mark, from the 1890 flood.

In early February, after the heavy rains caused by Tropical Cyclone Buninyong, the weather had finally broken, and to his surprise, Somerset saw from his porch a great wall of water come down the Stanley River. This was especially concerning to Somerset, as the heavy rains caused by a tropical cyclone Buninyong (informally named after the ship that first sighted it) had already caused the Stanley River to exceed the 1890 flood level. Somerset, realizing that people downriver where in great danger sent one of his workers, Henry (Harry) Winwood to Esk to send a telegraph to warn them. The telegraph sent warned the Brisbane General Post Office that Brisbane, Ipswich, Goodna, Lowood and other areas were in danger. The inhabitants of Brisbane were not worried however due to the fine weather, as the days of heavy rain having ended, all threat of floods seemed to have disappeared. The Brisbane General Post Office only posted the warning on a single noticeboard, and it went almost completely unheeded.

On 17 February, another cyclone crossed the Queensland coast near Bundaberg to drench the already saturated Brisbane River catchment. Somerset observed that the Brisbane River was flooded in similar levels to the first flood of the Stanley River. He knew that the telegraph lines were down between Esk and Brisbane, but he knew that there was a telegraph office at the small township of North Pine (now Petrie), although this would require crossing the D'Aguilar Range. William (Billy) Mateer, of Eidsvold (Dalgangel Station) was Somerset's most talented horseman, and he was selected to undertake this dangerous mission. Somerset and his men had to arrange for a dangerous crossing of the already flooded Brisbane River, with Mateer sent on with the only surviving horse (called Lunatic). Mateer survived the hazardous journey to North Pine, and delivered Somerset's message, which was again sadly ignored.

Whilst the warnings went unheeded, as a result of these heroic efforts, Caboonbah Station was made an official flood warning station, with a telegraph line to Esk. Somerset initially manned the station in its early years, having to use morse code for 12 years prior to the introduction of the telephone.

In modern times, Caboonbah Homestead was restored and used as a museum. However, on Monday 11 May 2009, the homestead caught fire and burnt to the ground.

== Mitigation works ==
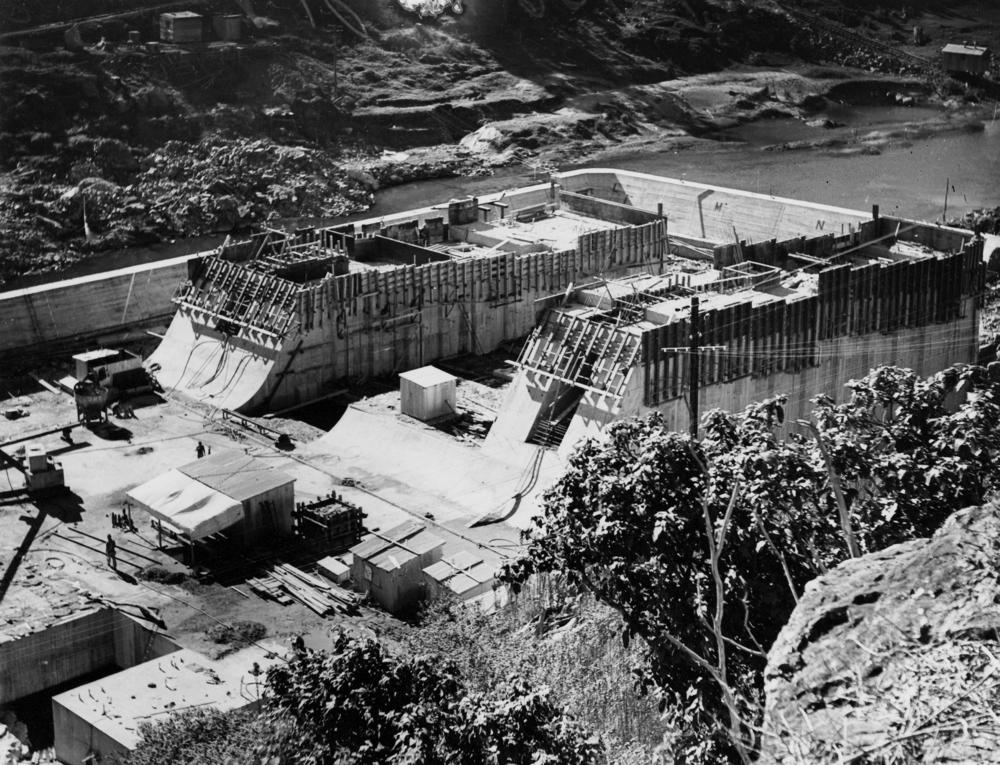
Construction of Somerset Dam, 1938.

Lake Somerset is a 904,000 megalitre dam located on the Stanley River (the normal water supply capacity is 380,000 megalitres, but the dam can hold another 524,000 megalitres of extra flood capacity). The site was first suggested for the location of a dam by Henry Somerset, after the 1893 floods, and he championed its construction when he was elected to parliament in 1904, where he served for 16 years as the Member for Stanley. Construction of the dam was not started until 1933, and it was finally finished in 1953. It was seen as a major job creation project when it commenced in the Great Depression, but was delayed by World War II when its workers were redeployed.

The same day that the notice of Billy Mateer's death appeared in the newspaper, there was also a major announcement that the Queensland Government had approved the construction of Somerset Dam. The site had been identified in 1933, by the Bureau of Industry.

Floods occur naturally, but now they had become a serious threat to people in this area. The clearing and developing of the land close to the water's edge essentially caused an increase in height and velocity of the rising water, and of the resulting damage. European thinking was the basis for the belief that engineering a dam could tame a river system. By 1959, it was believed that the Brisbane River system was regulated. By the 1970s, the social memory of the 1893 floods had all but vanished.

This memory was refreshed by the 1974 Brisbane flood.

== See also ==
- List of disasters in Australia by death toll
