= Victoria Bridge, Brisbane =

Bridge in Brisbane, Queensland, Australia

Victoria Bridge
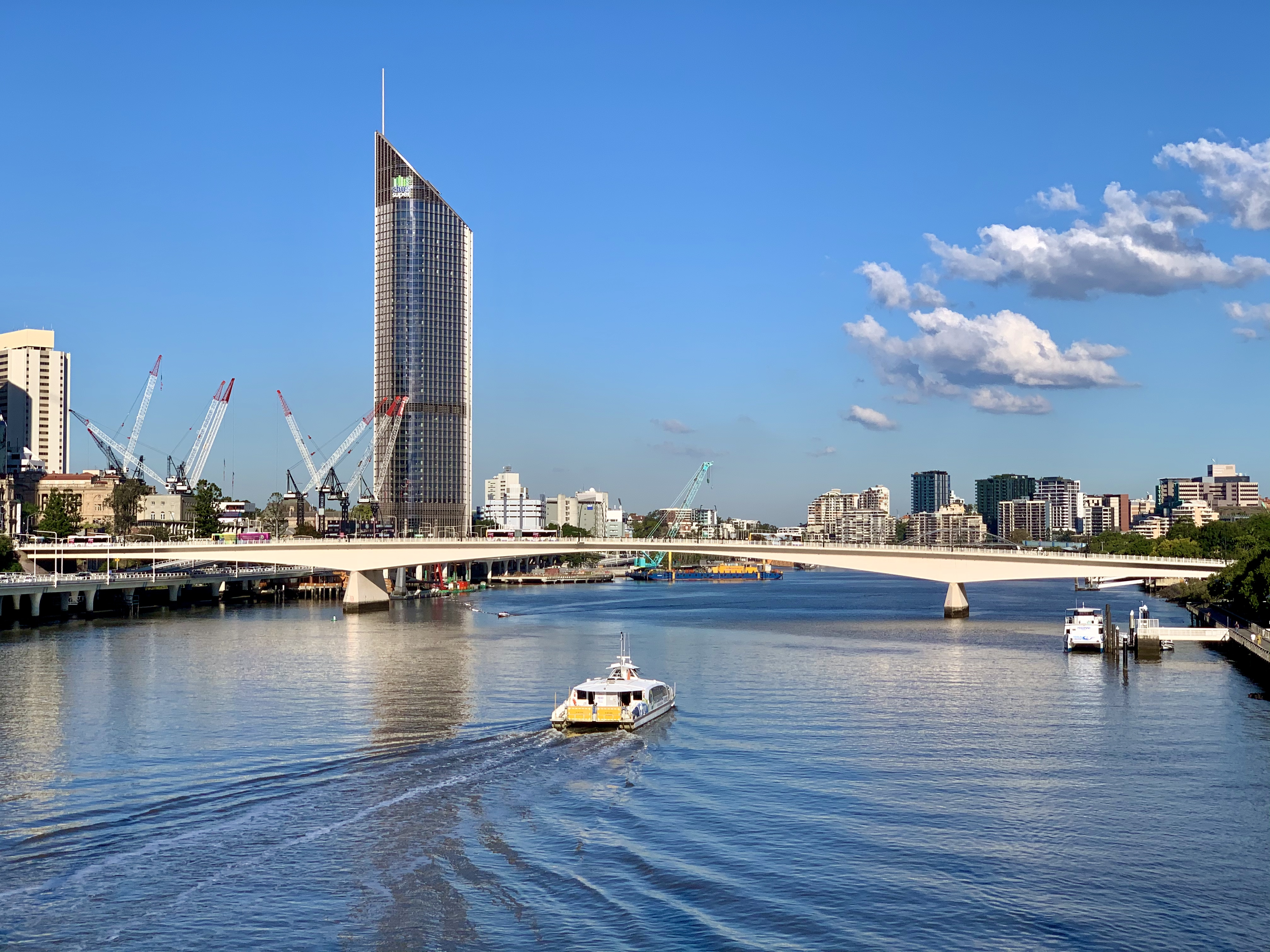
- Victoria Bridge in 2020
- Coordinates: 27.472476°S 153.021022°E
- Carries: Buses, pedestrians and cyclists
- Crosses: Brisbane River
- Locale: Brisbane, Queensland, Australia

Characteristics
- Material: Concrete
- Total length: 313 m
- No. of spans: 3

History
- Designer: Coordinator General's Department
- Construction end: 1969
- Opened: 1969; 57 years ago

Location
- Interactive map of Victoria Bridge

The Victoria Bridge is a bus and pedestrian bridge over the Brisbane River. The current bridge, opened in 1969, is the third permanent crossing erected at this location. Since 24 January 2021, the bridge has been closed to general traffic, and now carries buses, pedestrians and cyclists only.

The Victoria Bridge, the Brisbane River's first road crossing has had a long and interesting history. Since 1865 there have been several versions of the bridge built to connect South Brisbane (near the South Bank Parklands and Queensland Cultural Centre) to the Brisbane central business district (CBD) at North Quay. Half of the road space on the bridge is now given over to the South East Busway. In the 2006 Brisbane City Centre Draft Masterplan, a new crossing immediately adjacent to the Victoria Bridge, tentatively named the Adelaide Street Bridge was recommended for a feasibility study.

== 1864 Brisbane Bridge ==
Construction of a bridge across the Brisbane River was first agreed to in 1861. The newly formed Legislative Assembly of Queensland forced the council to pay for the costs, to be financed by unsold crown land in South Brisbane which was transferred to the Corporation of Brisbane under the terms of the Brisbane Bridge Act of 1861. £70,000 worth of borrowings was acquired from the Bank of Queensland secured by mortgage of the bridge lands. Work began on the foundations for the first bridge across the Brisbane River, then known as the Brisbane Bridge, on 22 August 1864. The contractor, John Bourne, offered to convert the scaffolding he was constructing into a temporary bridge. In return for this and an annual payment to the council, he was allowed to charge a toll. This timber structure opened in June 1865. The Bank of Queensland suspended payments in July 1866 and the shareholders decided to wind the bank up, bringing about a halt to funding for the project. The Queensland Government was reluctant to take on responsibility for the bridge's construction because it didn't want to incur debt. The timber bridge quickly succumbed to marine wood worm Teredo Navalis and began to progressively collapse. The council wasn't able to fully repair the structure and its remnants took two years to fall away into the river, along with some components of the partly built iron bridge. After the bridge collapsed on 16 November 1867, the public had to resort back to using ferries to cross the river.

== 1874 Victoria Bridge ==
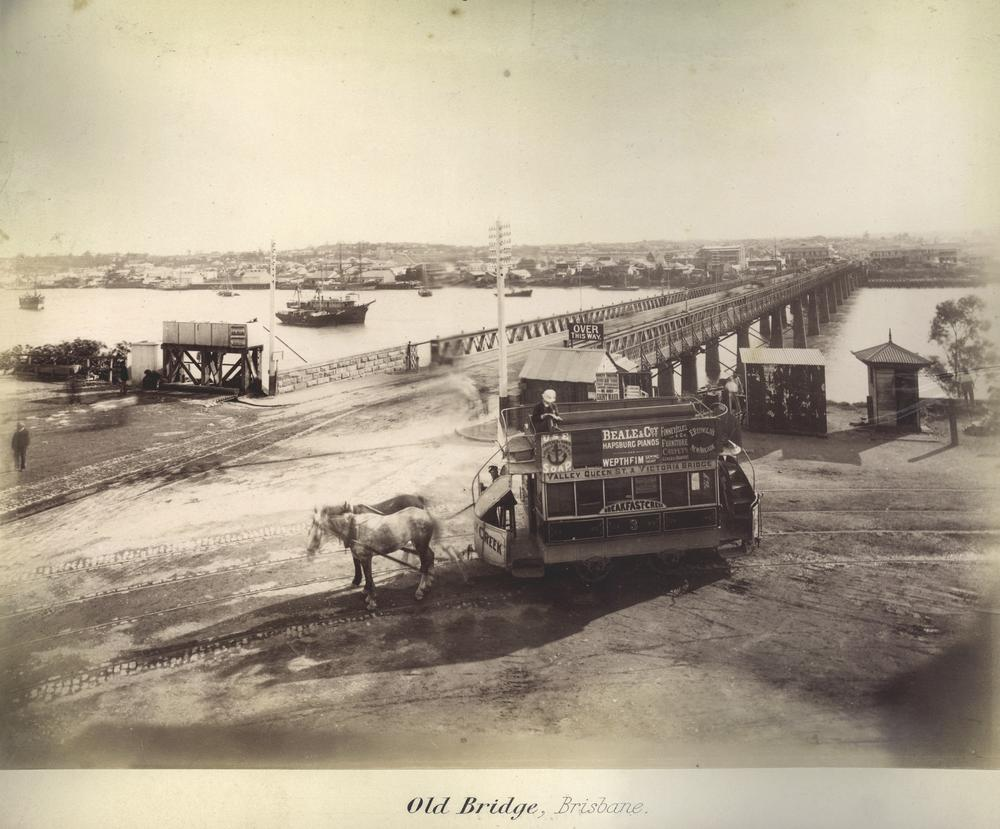
Horse tram at the northern end of the first permanent Victoria Bridge, c. 1890

Following resolution of the issue of the debt owed to the liquidators of the Bank Of Queensland in 1871, an English company, Peto, Brassey and Co, agreed to complete the bridge. The new crossing was opened on 15 June 1874 by the Governor of Queensland, George Phipps, 2nd Marquess of Normanby who gave it the name "Victoria Bridge", and was an iron structure and a toll bridge. The bridge was paid for by significant council borrowings that were to be recouped by tolls. However a lack of revenue and widespread community objections to the tolls forced its transfer to the Colonial Government. The tolls were abolished at this time. The bridge included a turning span to allow tall-masted river traffic to pass upstream. A condition of the original Bridge Act was that the bridge "would not obstruct the navigation of the river Brisbane by sea-going vessels". Over time, the swing was little used and subsequently water and gas pipes were laid across it. After the Council lost a court action in 1885 brought by a ship owner when it refused to operate the swing, the Government swiftly passed legislation fixing the bridge. The next year, tram-lines were laid along the bridge. It carried a 6 in (0.15 m) and a 9 in (0.23 m) diameter pipe which supplied mains water to South Brisbane. This bridge was partially washed away in the 1893 Brisbane flood. In the meantime, ferries were used to transport people and goods across the busy river. This, however, led to the capsize of the ferry ‘’Pearl’’ disaster in 1896 with the loss of more than 40 lives. A temporary wooden structure was built covering the collapsed section of the old bridge while the new bridge was being built.

== 1897 Victoria Bridge ==
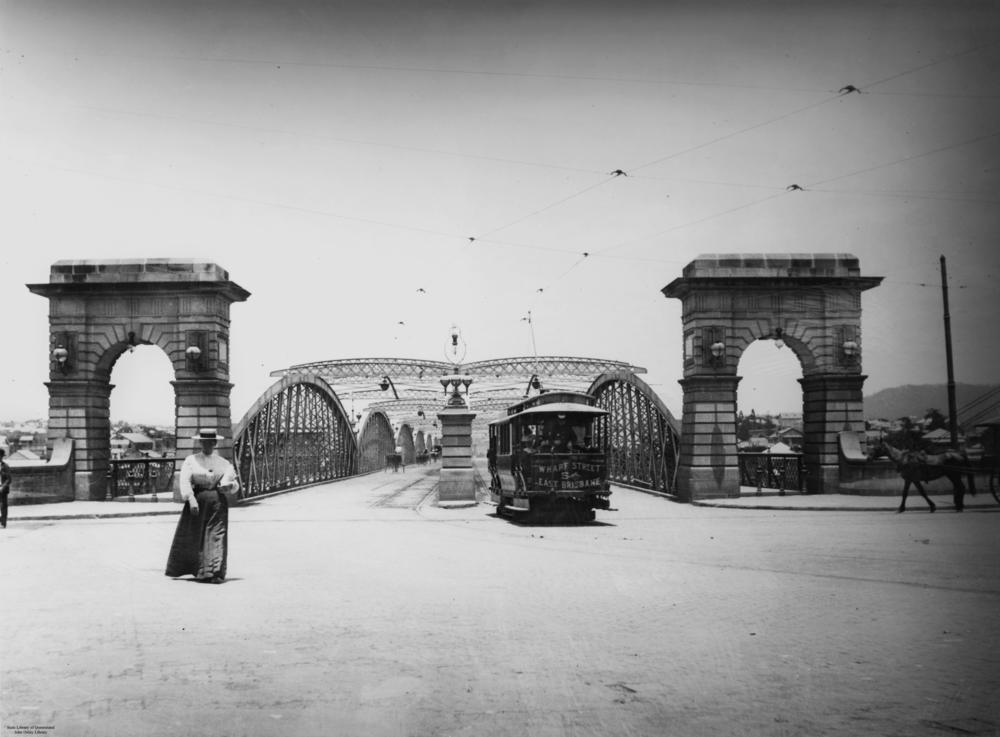
Early electric tram at the northern end of the second permanent Victoria Bridge, c. 1906

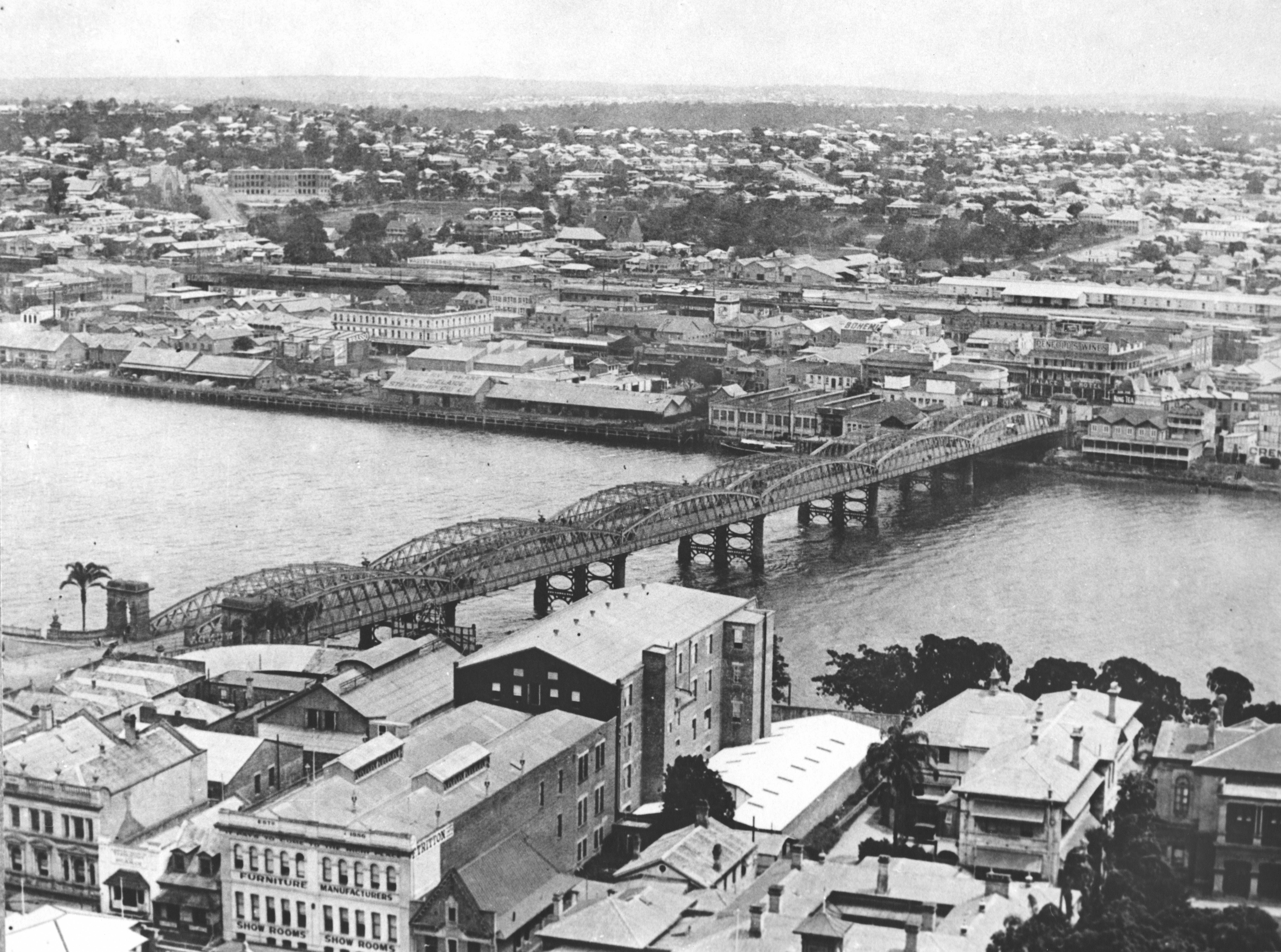
Victoria Bridge from the north-western side, 1933

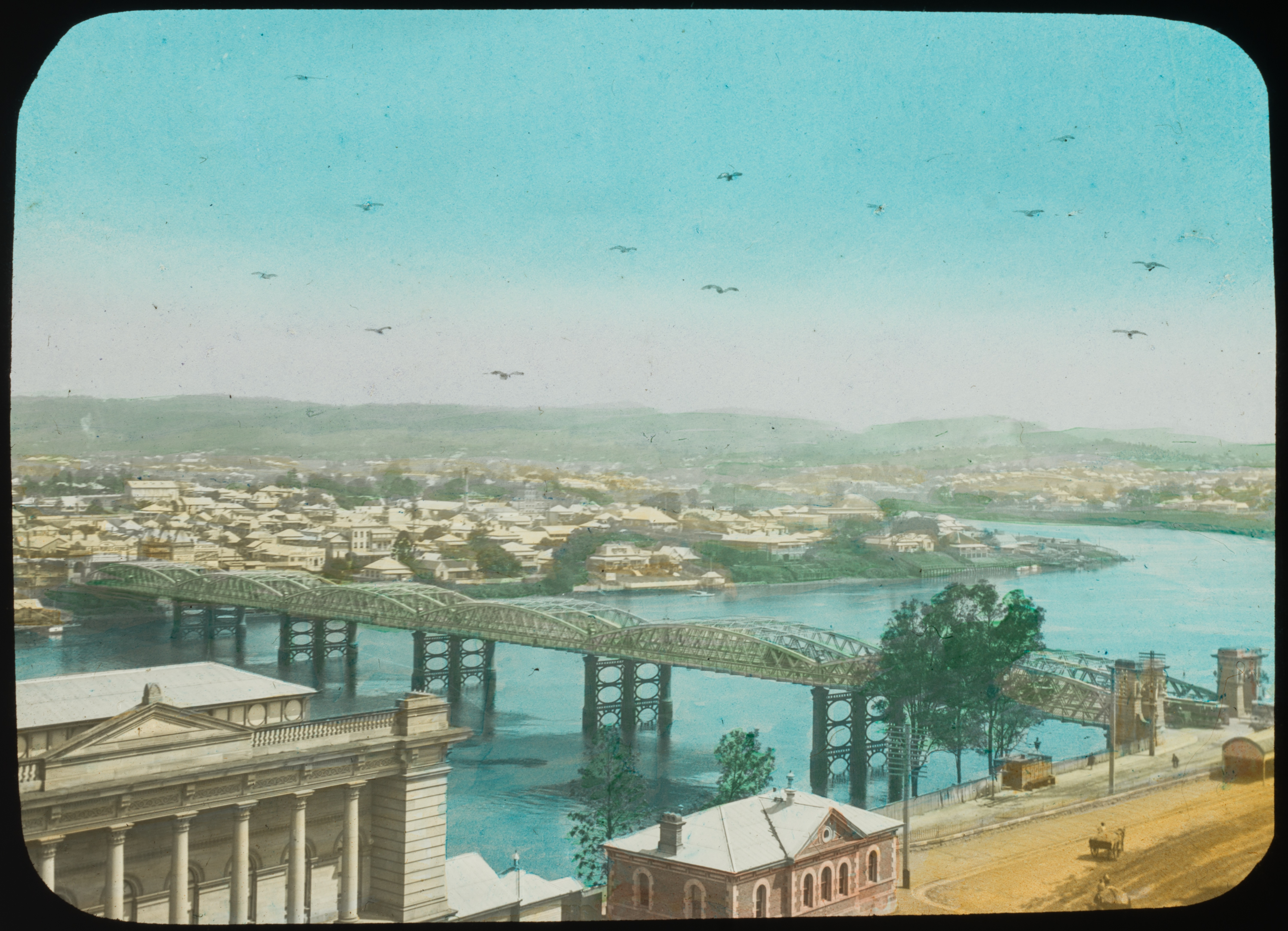
William Street end of the Victoria Bridge, circa 1910

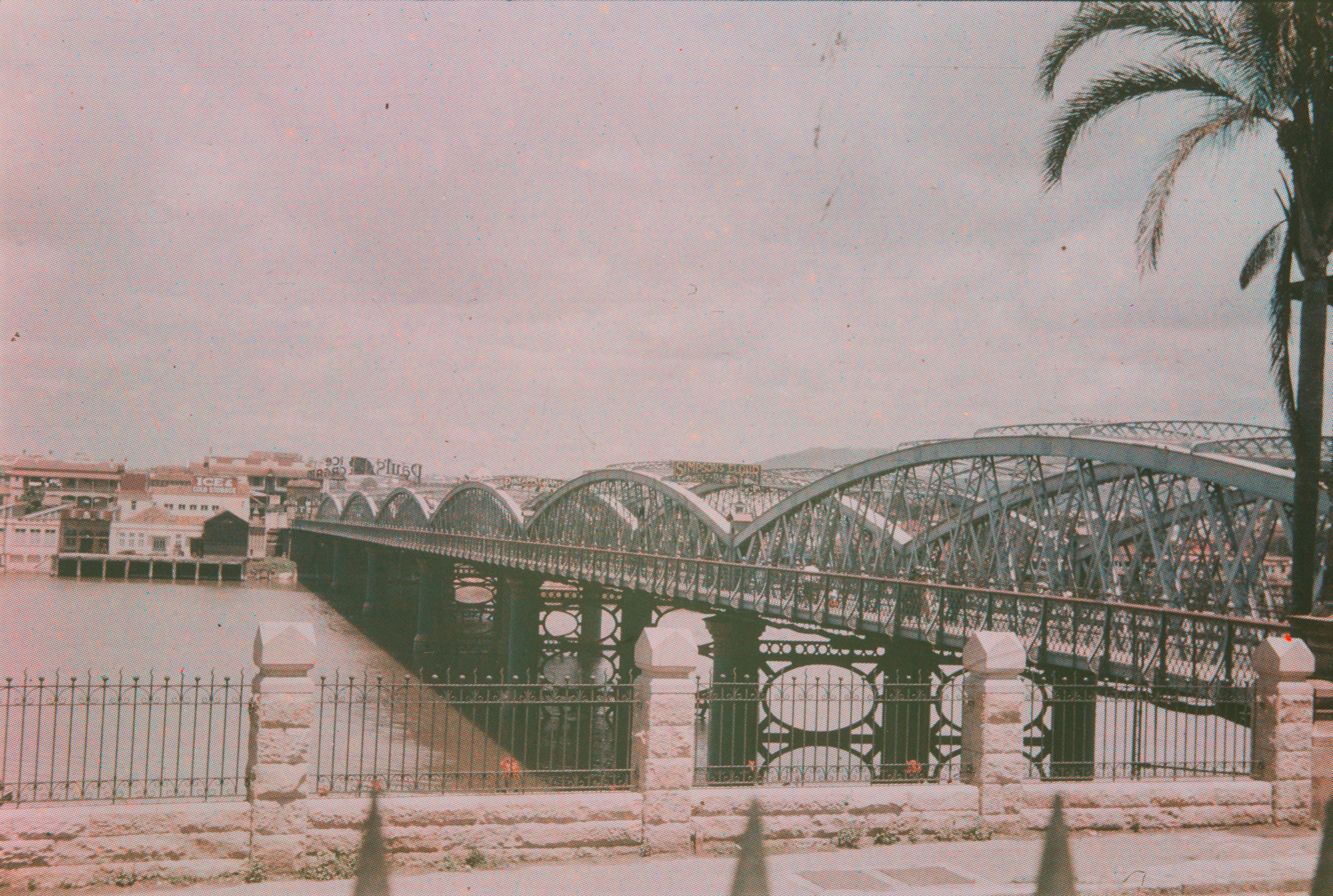
Victoria Bridge from the north-eastern side with the Queens Wharf Road retaining wall in the foreground, 1954

Another replacement bridge was built and entered service in 1897, lasting until 1969, when it was demolished. This second bridge was designed by Alfred Barton Brady. It was constructed of steel and wrought iron (superstructure), cast iron (structure) and stone (abutments and wing walls - purple hard stone/porphyry, brown freestone and Portland cement) and had two carriage ways and two footpaths. As early as 1943 evidence of the bridge buckling from the weight of increased traffic was noticed. Tram numbers on the bridge had to be restricted and cars limited to the outer lanes as a result.

A portion of the southern abutment of the previous bridge remains adjacent to the current bridge, including a pedestrian arch, a short remnant of tram track and a memorial to Hector Vasyli, a young boy who was killed in a traffic accident at that point when waving to servicemen returning from the First World War. The abutment is heritage-listed.

== Current bridge ==
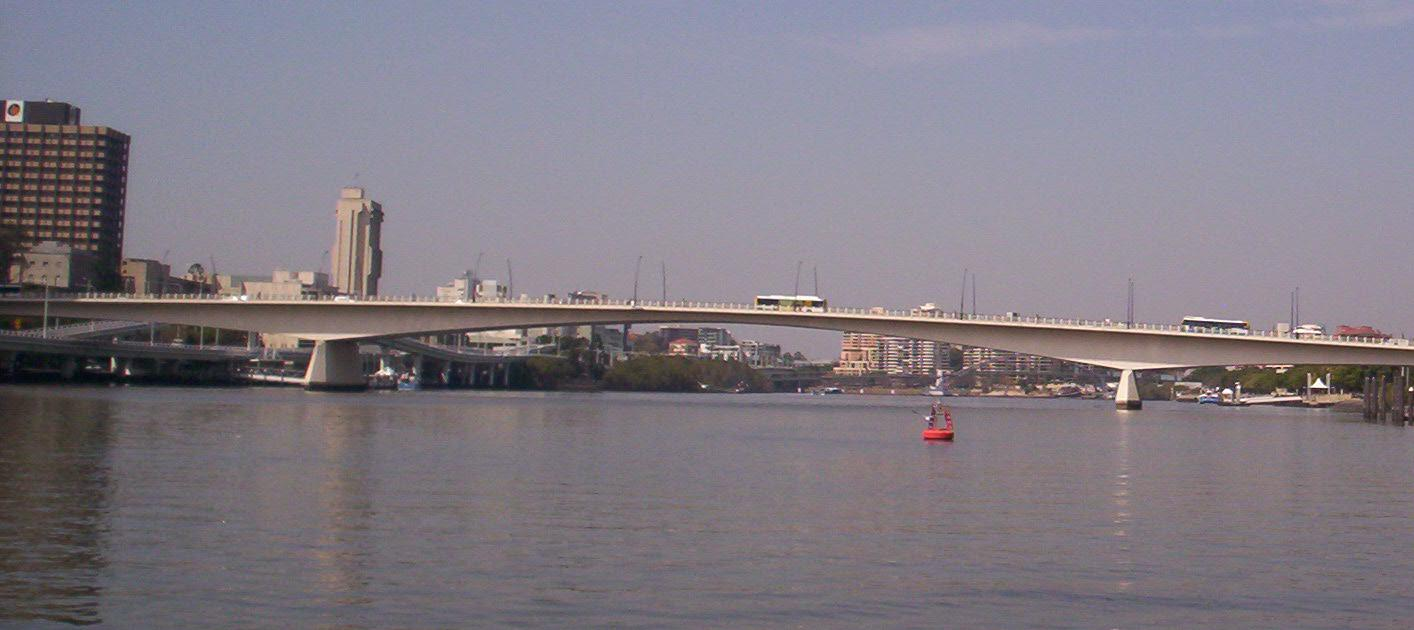
Victoria Bridge, showing buses crossing the bridge

Planning commenced on a new bridge in 1953, however in 1957 an inspection revealed that there had been no deterioration since 1949, and with careful maintenance, its life would be indefinite. A new bridge, which was opened on 14 April 1969, was needed to meet growing traffic demands. It cost A$3.2 million and featured a modern design which has been described as sleek and elegant. For a short period both bridges were open, each operating in one direction only.

=== Closure for general traffic ===
As part of the Brisbane Metro project, the bridge was closed to general traffic in 2021. Construction to reconfigure the bridge was done during 2022 to 2025. The bridge now provide 3 lanes for buses, two footpaths for pedestrians and one two-way bikeway for cyclists (branded as CityLink).

== See also ==
- Bridges over the Brisbane River
