= Jack Pesch Bridge =

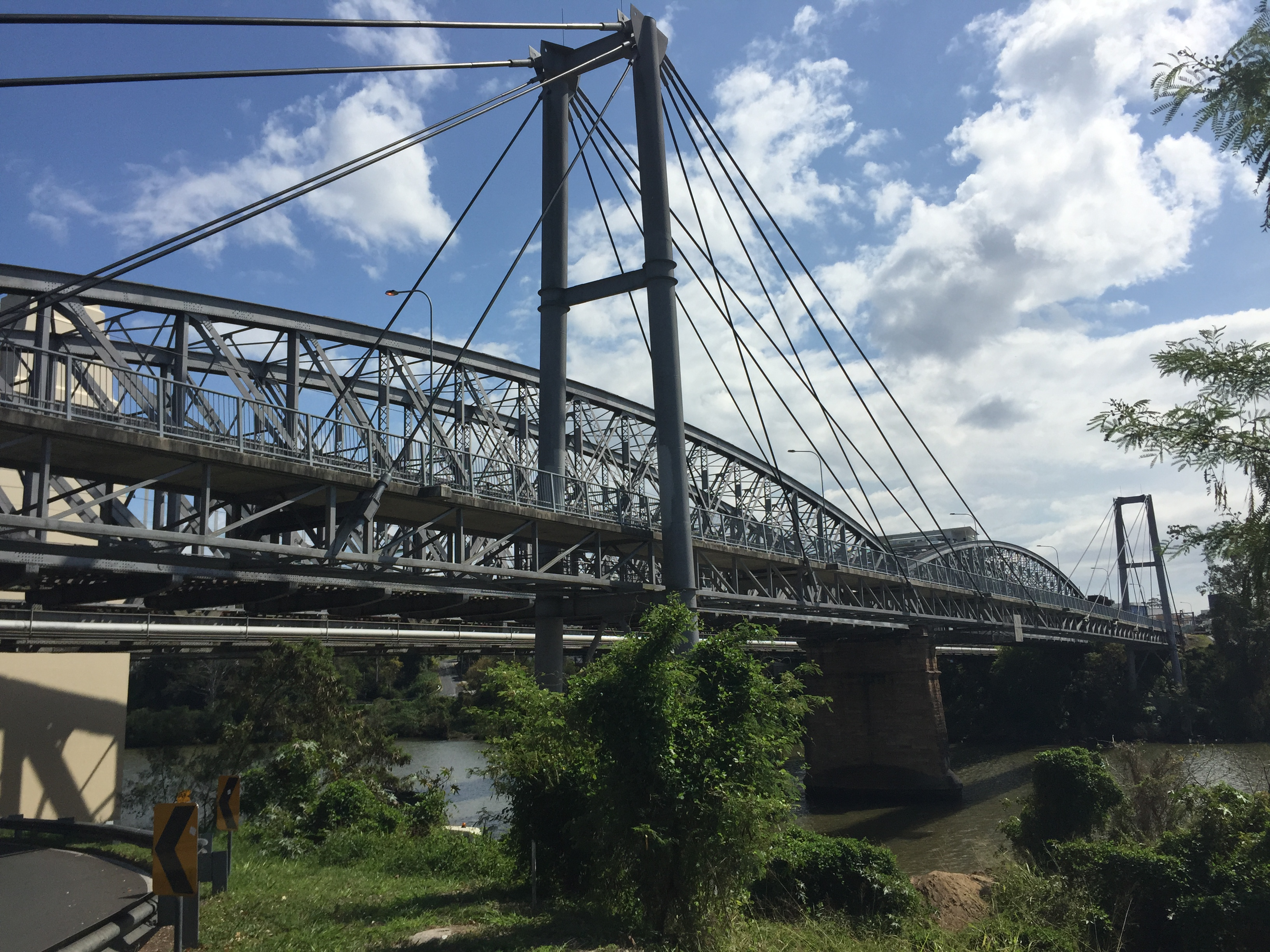
- Coordinates: 27.505826°S 152.974191°E
- Carries: Pedestrians, bicycles
- Crosses: Brisbane River
- Locale: Brisbane, Queensland, Australia
- Official name: Jack Pesch Bridge

Characteristics
- Design: Cable-stayed bridge

History
- Opened: 2 October 1998; 27 years ago

Location
- Interactive map of Jack Pesch Bridge

The Jack Pesch Bridge is a pedestrian and cyclist bridge that crosses the Brisbane River. It is named in honour of Jack Pesch (c. 1917 – 2002), a cycling champion during the 1930s. He subsequently ran a bicycle shop in Petrie Terrace, Brisbane, until the mid-1990s, selling and servicing his own 'Rocket' cycles and cycle parts.

The bridge crosses the Indooroopilly Reach of the River, linking Chelmer and Indooroopilly. It is immediately adjacent to the Albert and Walter Taylor Bridges. It was opened on 2 October 1998 by the Queensland Minister for Transport, Steve Bredhauer, and the Lord Mayor of Brisbane, Jim Soorley.

The bridge is for the exclusive use of pedestrians and cyclists. With a minor exception to emergency vehicles during bridge closure works on the Walter Taylor bridge, after traffic control clears the bridge of pedestrians and cyclists.
