= Chelmer, Queensland =

Chelmer
- Suburb
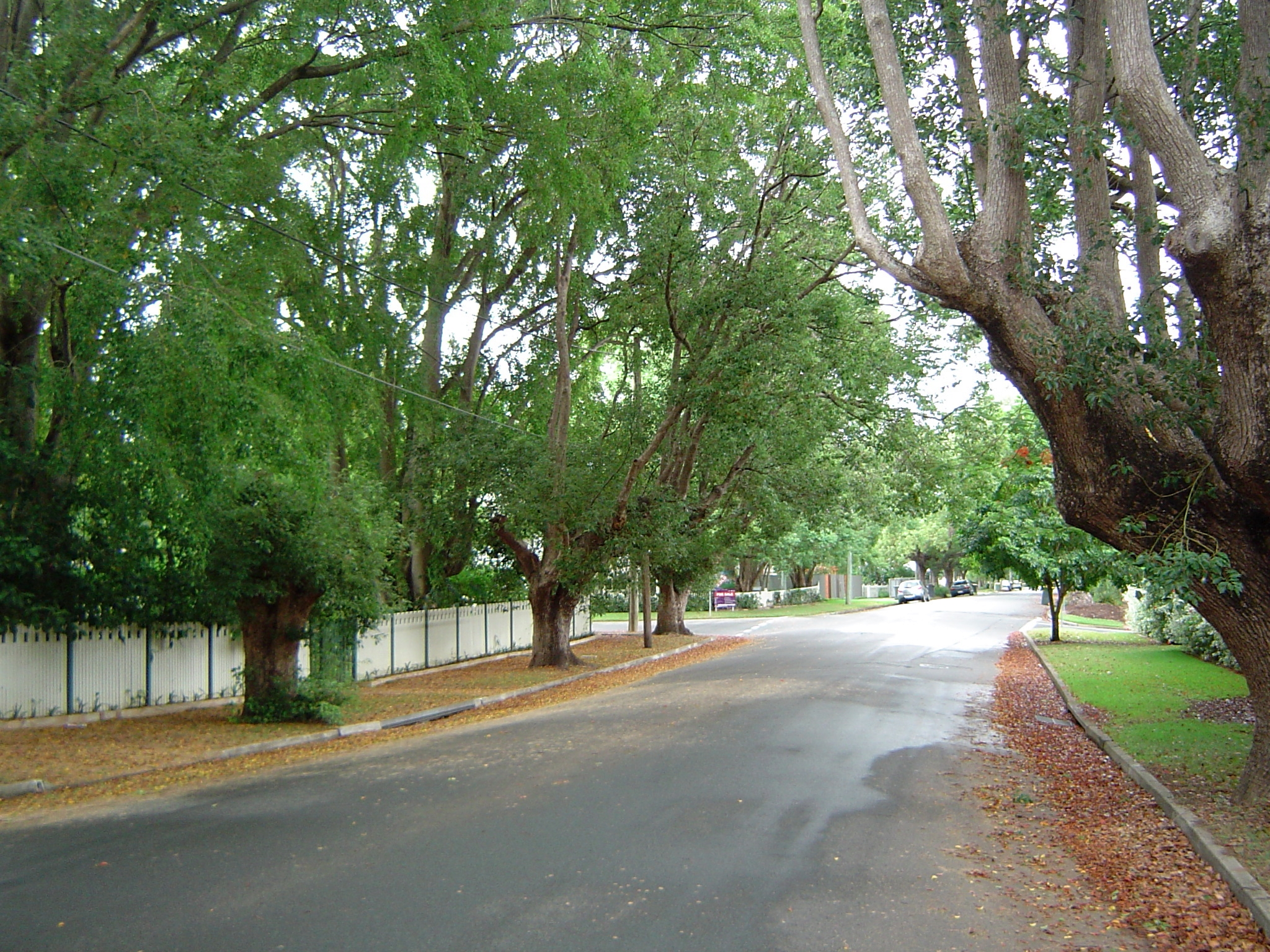
- Camphor laurel trees along Laurel Avenue

- Interactive map of Chelmer
- Coordinates: 27.5122°S 152.9761°E
- Country: Australia
- State: Queensland
- City: Brisbane
- LGA: City of Brisbane (Tennyson Ward)
- Location: 9.8 km (6.1 mi) SW of Brisbane CBD

Government
  - State electorate: Miller
  - Federal division: Moreton

Area
  - Total: 1.8 km^{2} (0.69 sq mi)
- Elevation: 20 m (66 ft)

Population
  - Total: 3,325 (2021 census)
  - Density: 1,850/km^{2} (4,780/sq mi)
- Time zone: UTC+10:00 (AEST)
- Postcode: 4068
Suburbs around Chelmer
| Indooroopilly | Indooroopilly | Indooroopilly |
| Indooroopilly | Chelmer | Indooroopilly |
| Fig Tree Pocket | Graceville | Graceville |

Chelmer is a south-western suburb in the City of Brisbane, Queensland, Australia. In the 2021 census, Chelmer had a population of 3,325.

== Geography ==
Chelmer is 9.8 kilometres (6.1 mi) by road from Brisbane GPO. Chelmer is zoned as a residential area, and consists of low-density housing. It has many fine Queenslanders, characterised by wooden verandahs, wide stairways and roofing of galvanized iron, but in recent years solid brick homes have been built also.

Chelmer is located on a bend of the Brisbane River, between the Chelmer Reach (27.5108°S 152.9675°E) and the Indooroopilly Reach (27.516°S 152.987°E), with all sides except south bounded by the median of the river.

There are four bridges across the Brisbane River from Chelmer to Indooroopilly to the north (from west to east):

- Walter Taylor Bridge, a road bridge (27.5056°S 152.9737°E)
- Indooroopilly Railway Bridge, a rail bridge (27.5058°S 152.9739°E)
- Albert Bridge, a rail bridge (27.5059°S 152.9740°E)
- Jack Pesch Bridge, for pedestrians and cyclists (27.5059°S 152.9742°E)

Chelmer railway station is a railway station on the Main Line railway (27.5120°S 152.9728°E).

There are two foot bridges over the railway line (from north to south):

- from Honour Avenue to Halsbury Street just north of the Chelmer railway station (27.5113°S 152.9728°E)
- from Honour Avenue near Richmond Street to Appel Street, south of the railway station (27.5177°S 152.9745°E)

== History ==
The suburb takes its name from the Chelmer railway station, which was named in 1881 probably after the Chelmer River in Essex, England. The station was previously known as Oxley Point and Riverton.

Chelmer, along with its neighbors to the south was originally known as Boyland's Pocket after Thomas Boyland who leased the area for cattle and sheep grazing

The first railway station opened north of the current Chelmer railway station in 1876 as Oxley's Point railway station. In 1888, the station was renamed Riverton. A siding was built at the current station location in 1881, which was later converted into the current Chelmer railway station in 1889 with Riverton closing that same year.

In 1879, the local government area of Yeerongpilly Division was created. In 1891, parts of Yeerongpilly Division were excised to create Sherwood Division becoming a Shire in 1903 which contained the suburb of Chelmer. In 1925, the Shire of Sherwood was amalgamated into the City of Brisbane.

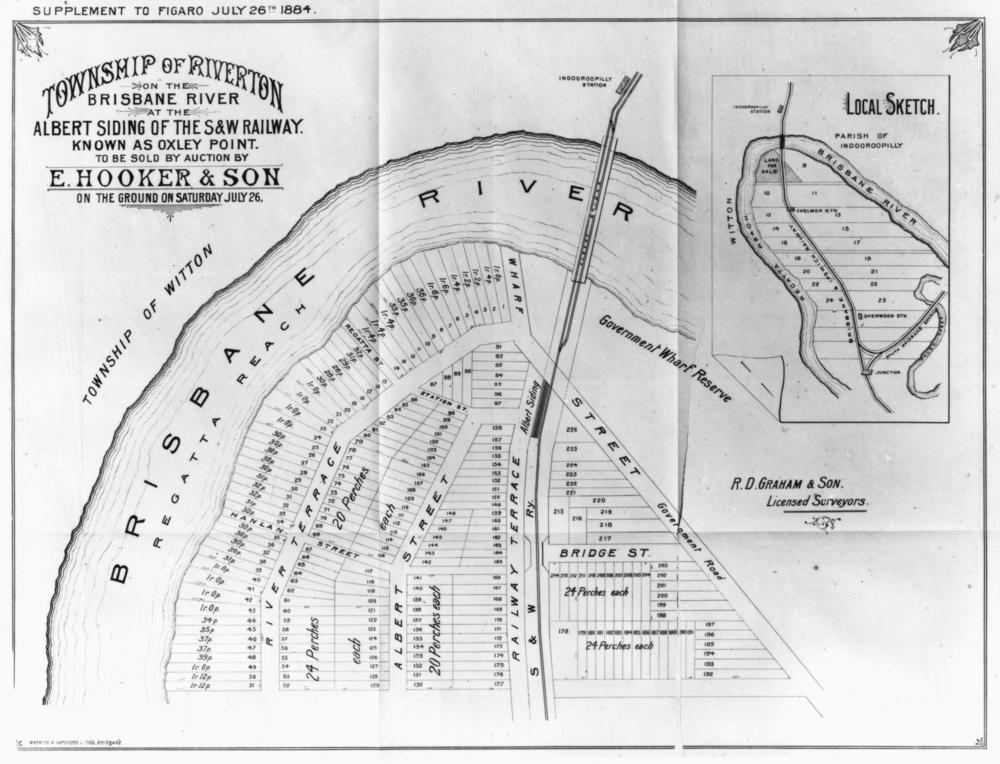
New estate map at Riverton (Chelmer)

In July 1884, 226 subdivided allotments of "Township of Riverton on the Brisbane River" Estate were auctioned by E. Hooker & Son. A map advertising the auction shows the area to be on the Regatta Reach of the Brisbane River.

In November 1901, 168 subdivided allotments of "Chelmer Estate" were auctioned by John W. Todd Auctioneer. A map advertising the auction shows the estate to be near the Brisbane River, Chelmer railway station and the golf club.

In June 1914, 114 choice allotments of "Chelmer Railway Station Estate" were auctioned by Chandler & Russell, Land and Estate Agents. A map advertising the auction shows the estate to be near Chelmer Railway Station. Newspaper advertising states the estate is "right at railway station, surrounded by reserve, park and railway line."

In October 1922, 135 allotments of "Chelmer Park, No. 5" were auctioned by Isles, Love & Co. Limited, Auctioneers. A map advertising the auction shows the estate to be on the Brisbane River. Newspaper advertising states the estate is "close to railway station with beautiful river views, river frontages".

On Tuesday 15 May 1923, the Chelmer School of Arts was officially opened by Cecil Elphinstone, the Member of the Queensland Legislative Assembly for Oxley. In 1968 it became Chelmer Public Hall and is now known as Chelmer Community Centre.

In August 1923, 82 subdivided allotments of "Chelmer Park Estate" were auctioned by Isles, Love & Co. Auctioneers. A map advertising the auction states the Estate was close to the Chelmer Railway Station and the Brisbane River.

The Indooroopilly Toll Bridge was proposed, designed, privately funded, and built by Walter Taylor. It was opened on 14 February 1936 and replaced the Chelmer-Indooroopilly ferry service. It was renamed Walter Taylor Bridge after his death in 1956. The private company he established, Indooroopilly Toll Bridge Ltd, collected a toll at the Indooroopilly end of the bridge until 1965 when the Brisbane City Council took over the bridge.

On Sunday 17 December 1939, Archbishop William Wand laid the foundation stone for St David's Anglican Church with over 300 people attending. It was dedicated in 1939 and consecrated in 1971. In 2019 St David's entered in a partnership with the Anglican parish of Crows Nest (which includes the churches in Crows Nest and Goombungee) to share their ministry through a combination of services at the various churches combined with online services broadcast from St David's. It is an experiment in how the Anglican Church may operate in the future.

Chelmer Special School opened on 20 February 1978 and closed on 8 May 1992.

Milpera Special School opened on 1 January 1984. On 28 September 1998, it was renamed Milpera State High School.

In 1999, Laurel Avenue was voted Brisbane's Best Street for its trees and grand homes. The avenue of camphor laurels and a number of houses in the street are now heritage-listed.

Chelmer suffered badly from the 2011 Queensland floods, with many homes submerged by the rising river.

== Demographics ==
In the 2021 census, Chelmer had a population of 3,325, 50% female and male. The median age of the Chelmer population was 41, 3 years above the Australian median. 72.8% of people in Chelmer were born in Australia, compared to the national average of 66.9%. The next most common countries of birth were England 5.7%, New Zealand 2.3%, China 1.6%, South Africa 1.5% and India 1.2%. 83.3% of people spoke only English at home; the next most popular languages were Mandarin 2.5%, Spanish 1.2%, Vietnamese 0.9%, Cantonese 0.8% and French 0.6%.

In the 2016 census, Chelmer had a population of 2,998, 49.8% female and 50.2% male. The median age was 39, 1 year above the Australian median. 75% of people were born in Australia, compared to the national average of 66.7%. The next most common countries of birth were England 5%, New Zealand 2.7%, USA and South Africa 1.2% and Scotland 1%. 86.5% of people spoke only English at home; the next most popular languages were Spanish 1.2%, Mandarin 1%, Cantonese 0.7%, German 0.6% and Portuguese 0.5%.

In the 2011 census, Chelmer recorded a population of 2,594, 50.5% female and 49.5% male. The median age was 38, 1 year above the Australian median. 77% of people were born in Australia, compared to the national average of 69.8%. The next most common countries of birth were England 5.3%, New Zealand 2.4%, USA 1.2%, Scotland 1% and Malaysia 0.7%. 89.6% of people spoke only English at home; the next most popular languages were 0.6% Hindi, 0.5% Korean, 0.4% Spanish, 0.3% Dutch and 0.3% Persian (excluding Dari).

== Heritage listings ==
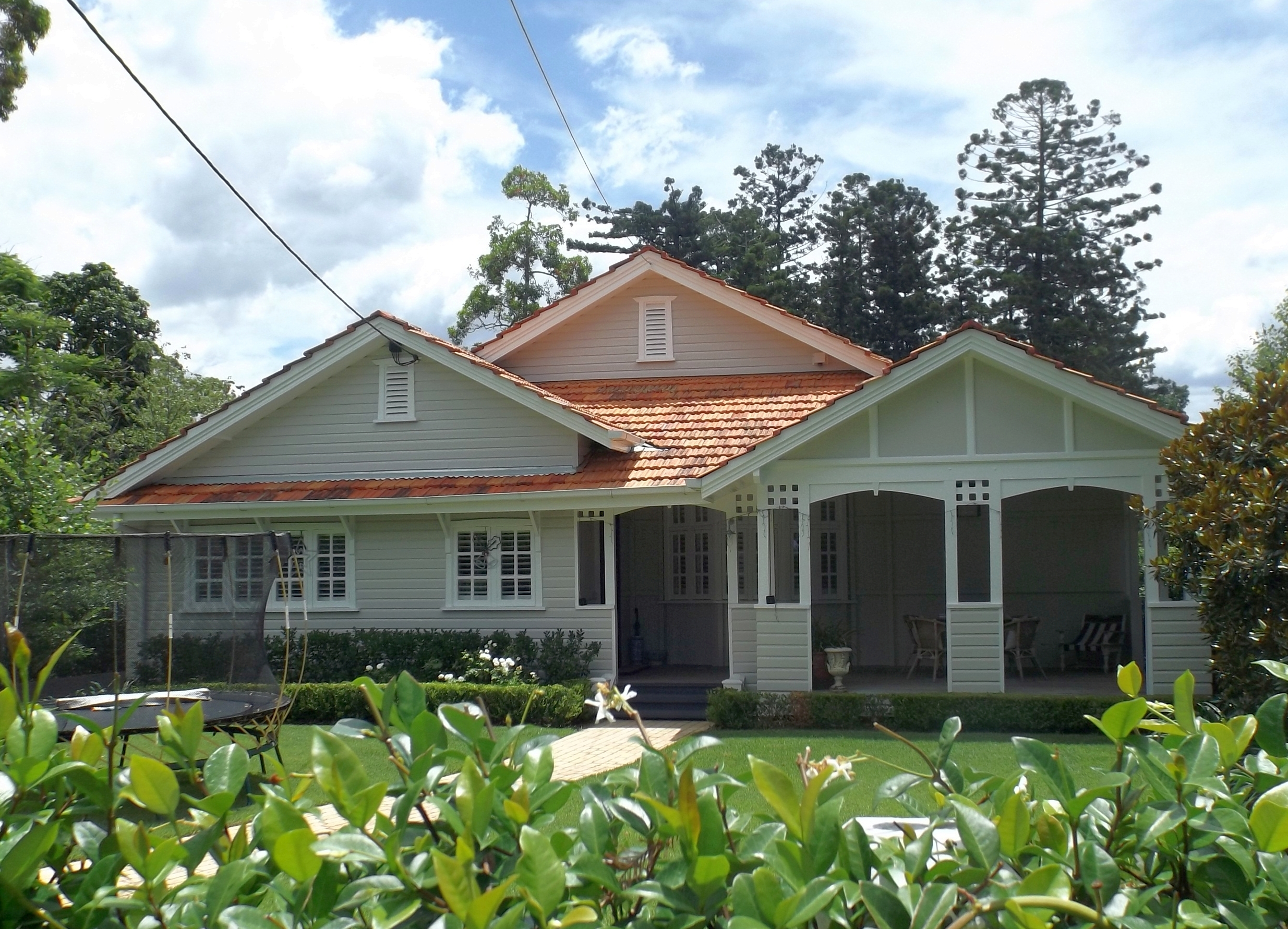
Swain House on Laurel Avenue was listed on the Queensland Heritage Register in 2003

Chelmer has a number of heritage-listed sites, including:

- St David's Anglican Church, 69 Chelmer Street East
- Leswell (house), 35 Hanlan Street
- Walter Taylor Bridge, Honour Avenue
- 1former Brisbane Golf Club Clubhouse, 15 Honour Avenue
- Dalmuir (house), 10 Lama Street
- Camphor Laurels, Aong Laurel Avenue (27.5135°S 152.9699°E)
- Hurlton (also known as W. R. Black Children's Home), 7 Laurel Avenue
- former Chelmer Police College (also known as Waterton, The Lady Wilson Red Cross Convalescent Home, 10 WRAAC Barracks), 17 Laurel Avenue
- Floraville (house), 115 Laurel Avenue
- Swain House, 139 Laurel Avenue
- Glenmore (house), 196 Laurel Avenue
- House, 201 Laurel Avenue
- Carinyah (house), 29 Longman Terrace
- Pontresina (house), now part of Regis Chelmer aged care residence, 66 Longman Terrace
- former Chelmer School of Arts (also known as Chelmer Public Hall), 15 Queenscroft Street
- Wahgunyah (house), 22 Victoria Avenue
- Albert Bridge, Wharf Street
- Mullen farmhouse, 73 Wharf Street

== Education ==
Milpera State High School is a government special-purpose secondary (7–12) school for boys and girls at Parker Street (27.5140°S 152.9775°E). In 2018, the school had an enrolment of 163 students with 35 teachers (28 full-time equivalent) and 34 non-teaching staff (19 full-time equivalent). It teaches English language to immigrants who are speakers of languages other than English. These students enter and leave the school as determined by their English language skills.

There are no primary schools in Chelmer. The nearest government primary school is Graceville State School in neighbouring Graceville to the south. The nearest conventional government secondary school is Indooroopilly State High School in neighbouring Indooroopilly to the north.

== Amenities ==
Chelmer Community Centre is at 15 Queenscroft Street (27.5110°S 152.9734°E).

St David's Anglican Church at 69 Chelmer Street East (27.5141°S 152.9736°E) holds regular services on Wednesdays and Sundays.

Riverside Christian Church is at 12 Glenwood Street (27.5122°S 152.9769°E).

== Sport ==
The Sherwood Districts Australian Football Club in Chelmer Street East (27.5137°S 152.9744°E) and the Kenmore Australian Football Club in Oxley Road (27.5118°S 152.9755°E) are Australian rules football clubs that compete in Division One of the AFLQ State League and Division One of the AFLQ State Association respectively.

== Attractions ==
Laurel Avenue was voted Brisbane's Best Street in 1999, for the reason that large portions of the avenue are overhung by large camphor laurel (Cinnamomum camphora) trees (some over a hundred years old). The camphor laurel trees have been declared a noxious weed by the Brisbane City Council, as their roots actively seek underground sewage pipes.

== Transport ==
Chelmer is divided into east and west by Queensland Rail City network's Ipswich and Rosewood railway line and the Chelmer railway station. The Albert Bridge and the Indooroopilly Railway Bridge join the railway to Indooroopilly. A pedestrian/bicycle bridge, alongside the road and rail bridges, also links Chelmer (on the Southern bank of the Brisbane River) to Indooroopilly.
