= Walter Taylor Bridge =

Heritage-listed bridge in Brisbane, Australia

Walter Taylor
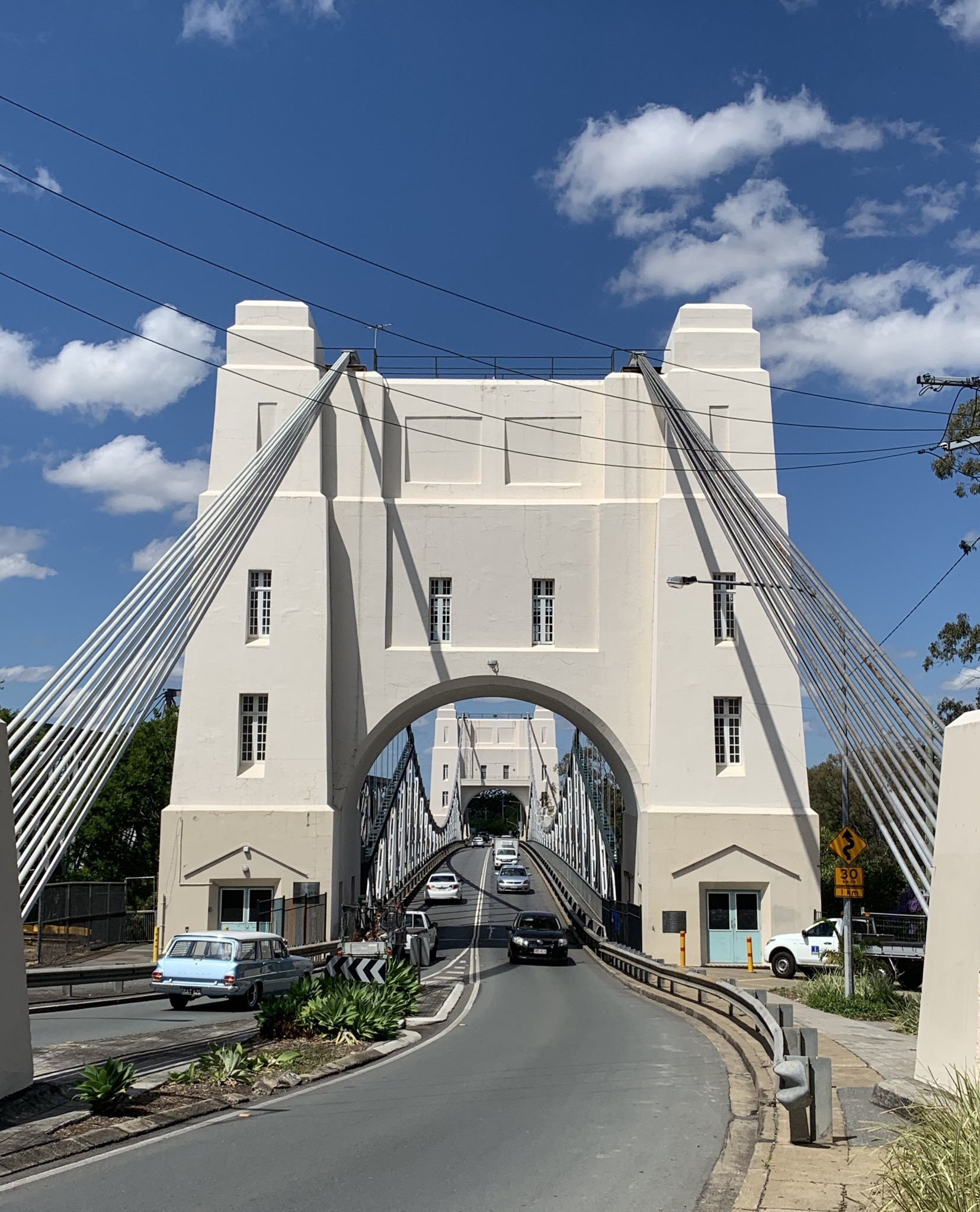
- Coordinates: 27.5058°S 152.9736°E
- Carries: Motor vehicles, pedestrians
- Crosses: Brisbane River
- Locale: Brisbane, Queensland, Australia
- Official name: Walter Taylor Bridge
- Other name: Indooroopilly Toll Bridge

Characteristics
- Design: Suspension bridge
- Total length: 299.7 metres (983 ft)
- Longest span: 182.9 metres (600 ft)

History
- Construction cost: £85,000
- Opened: 14 February 1936; 90 years ago

Location
- Interactive map of Walter Taylor

The Walter Taylor Bridge is a heritage-listed suspension bridge crossing the Brisbane River between Indooroopilly and Chelmer in Brisbane, Queensland, Australia. It is shared by motor traffic and pedestrians and is the only habitable bridge in the Southern Hemisphere. It was originally known as the Indooroopilly Toll Bridge.

== Design ==
The bridge is a similar design to the Hercilio Luz Bridge in Florianópolis, Brazil, with the truss carrying the bridge being above the roadway and meeting the cables at non-uniform heights. This means that the suspension cables form the top chord of the truss, and this configuration is known as the Steinman (after its inventor) or Florianópolis type.

The bridge is unique among Brisbane bridges in that the two towers of the bridge house residential accommodation, which were occupied until mid 2010 when the last members of the original tollmaster's family moved out. The Chelmer side of the bridge is bounded by a council park. A pontoon adjacent to this park was washed away in the 2011 flood, and to date has not been replaced. The Walter Taylor Bridge is one of four bridges in close proximity to each other. The others are the Albert Bridge, Indooroopilly Railway Bridge, and the Jack Pesch Bridge.

== History ==
The bridge was conceived, designed, built and funded by local visionary Walter Taylor, a contractor who lived in Graceville (adjacent to the suburb in Chelmer). Although there was a rail bridge to Indooroopilly and beyond to the northern suburbs of Brisbane, local residents were frustrated because there was no means by which cars could cross the river. Pedestrians had been able to cross the river on the 2 previous Albert Bridges from 1875 to 1893, and from 1895 until the opening of the Walter Taylor Bridge. Construction work began in 1930.

The bridge is a suspension bridge and its support cables are those that were used to hold up the incomplete halves of the Sydney Harbour Bridge during its construction. When the bridge opened it had the longest span of any suspension bridge in Australia.

The bridge was opened on 14 February 1936 by the Governor of Queensland, Sir Leslie Wilson, with the final cost (anchorage to anchorage) coming to £85,000. The bridge was operated by as a toll bridge until the 1960s, with a toll collection booth located at the Northern (Indooroopilly) end (see the video link below). During that time, the bridge was known as the "Indooroopilly Toll Bridge". It was operated by Indooroopilly Toll Bridge Limited, of which Taylor was a Director and Company Secretary, listed on the Brisbane Stock Exchange and with offices in the Central Buildings, Graceville. In its first full year it made a profit of £2581.

After Walter Taylor's death in 1955, the bridge was renamed the Walter Taylor Bridge in his honour in 1956.

== Heritage listing ==
The bridge was listed on the Queensland Heritage Register in 1992.

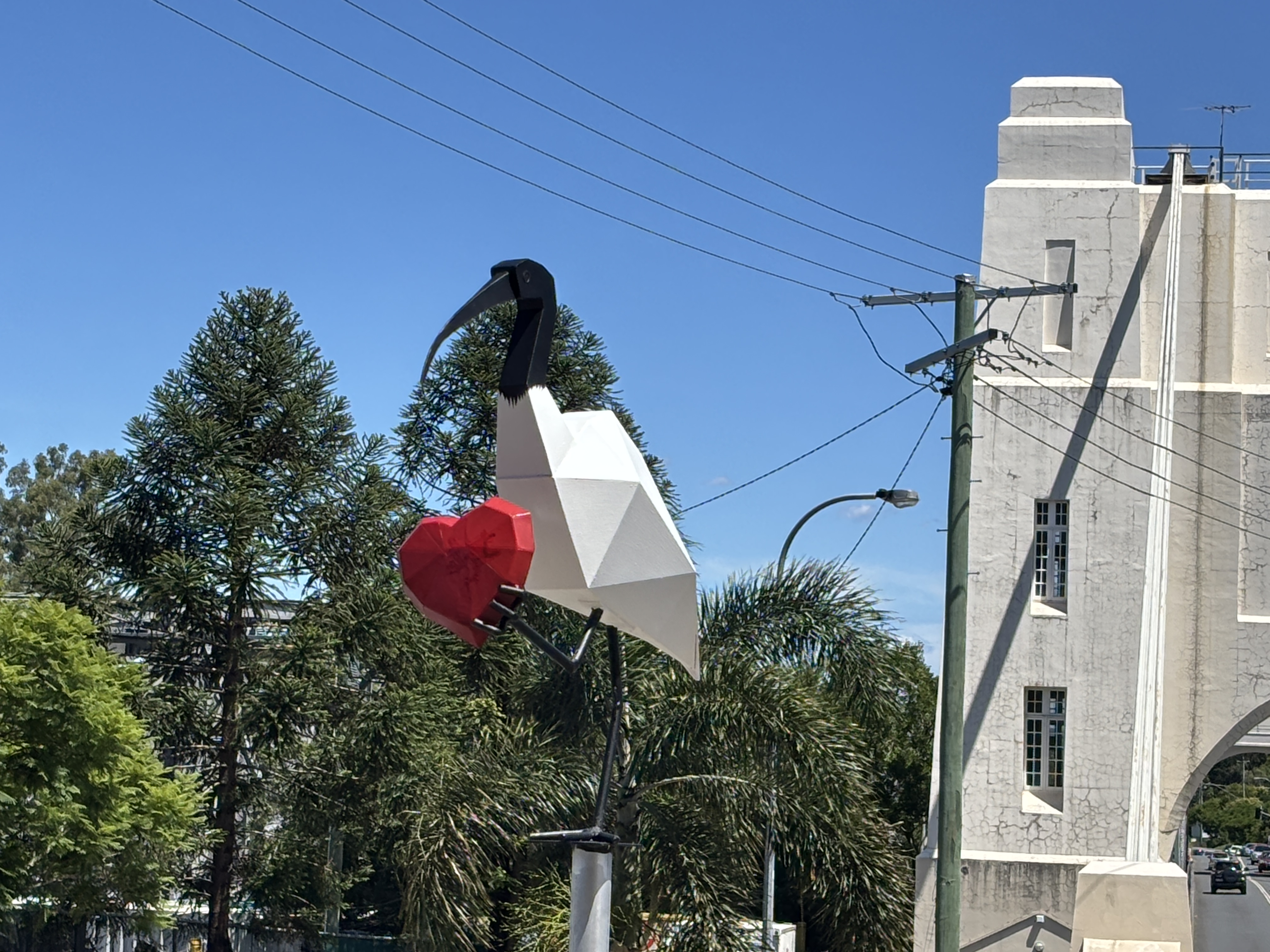
Sculpture of Walter, the Bin Chicken at the northern entrance to the bridge, 2026

== In popular culture ==
The bridge is part of the Bin Chicken Trail in Brisbane, a sculpture trail celebrating the "bin chicken" (Australian white ibis), a common urban bird in Brisbane. The bin chicken sculpture near the northern end of the bridge is named Walter in honour of the bridge.

== Gallery ==
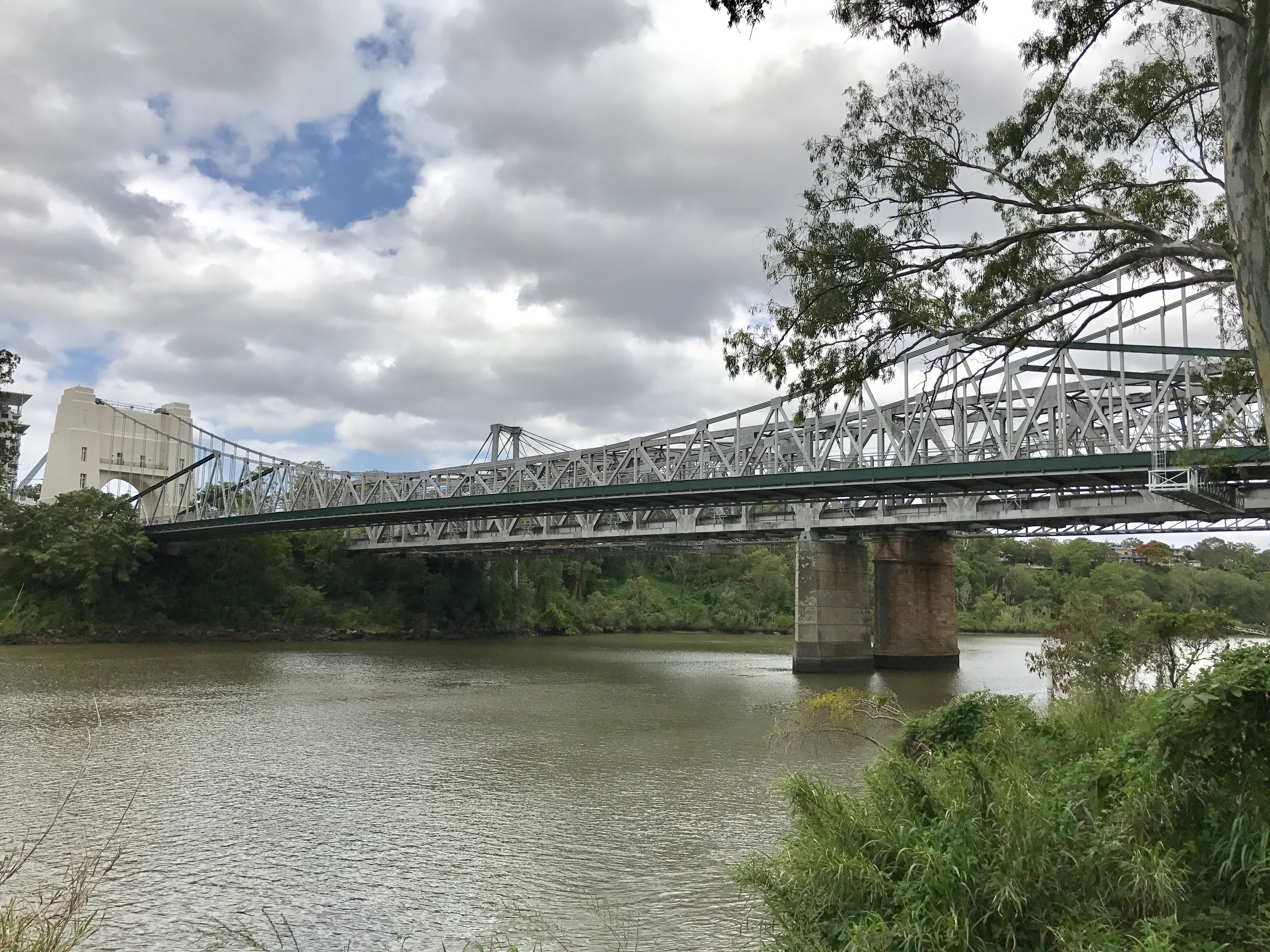
Walter Taylor Bridge (left) adjacent to the Indooroopilly Railway Bridge

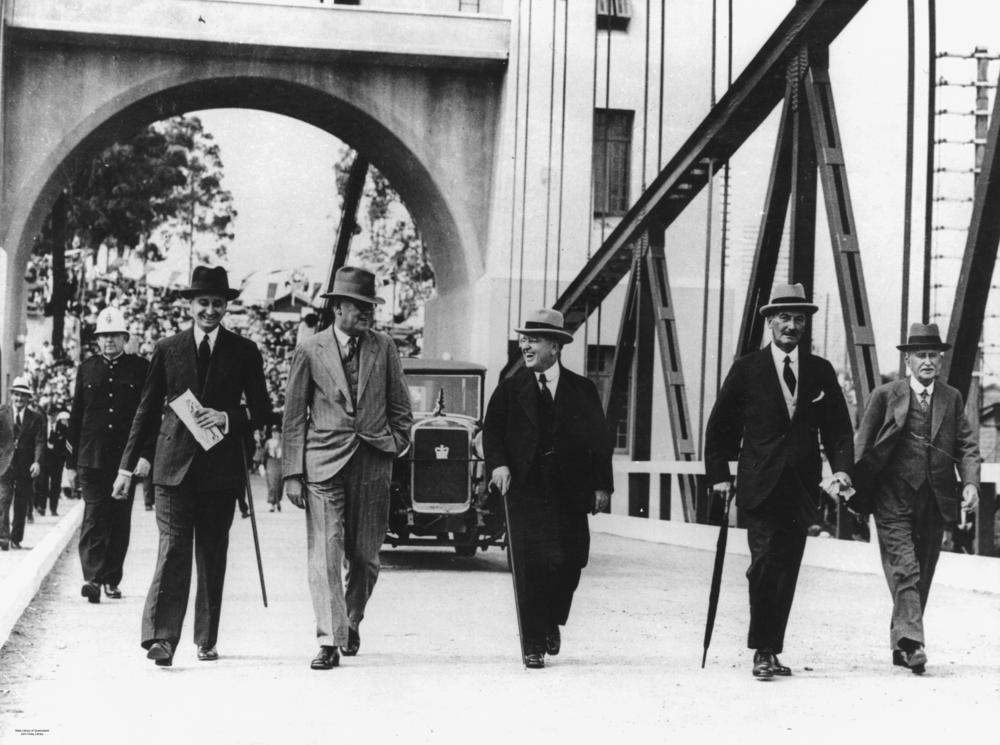
Official opening of the Indooroopilly Toll Bridge, Brisbane, 1936, Walter Taylor (far right)

== See also ==
- Bridges over the Brisbane River
