= Brisbane River =

River in Queensland, Australia

Brisbane River Maiwar
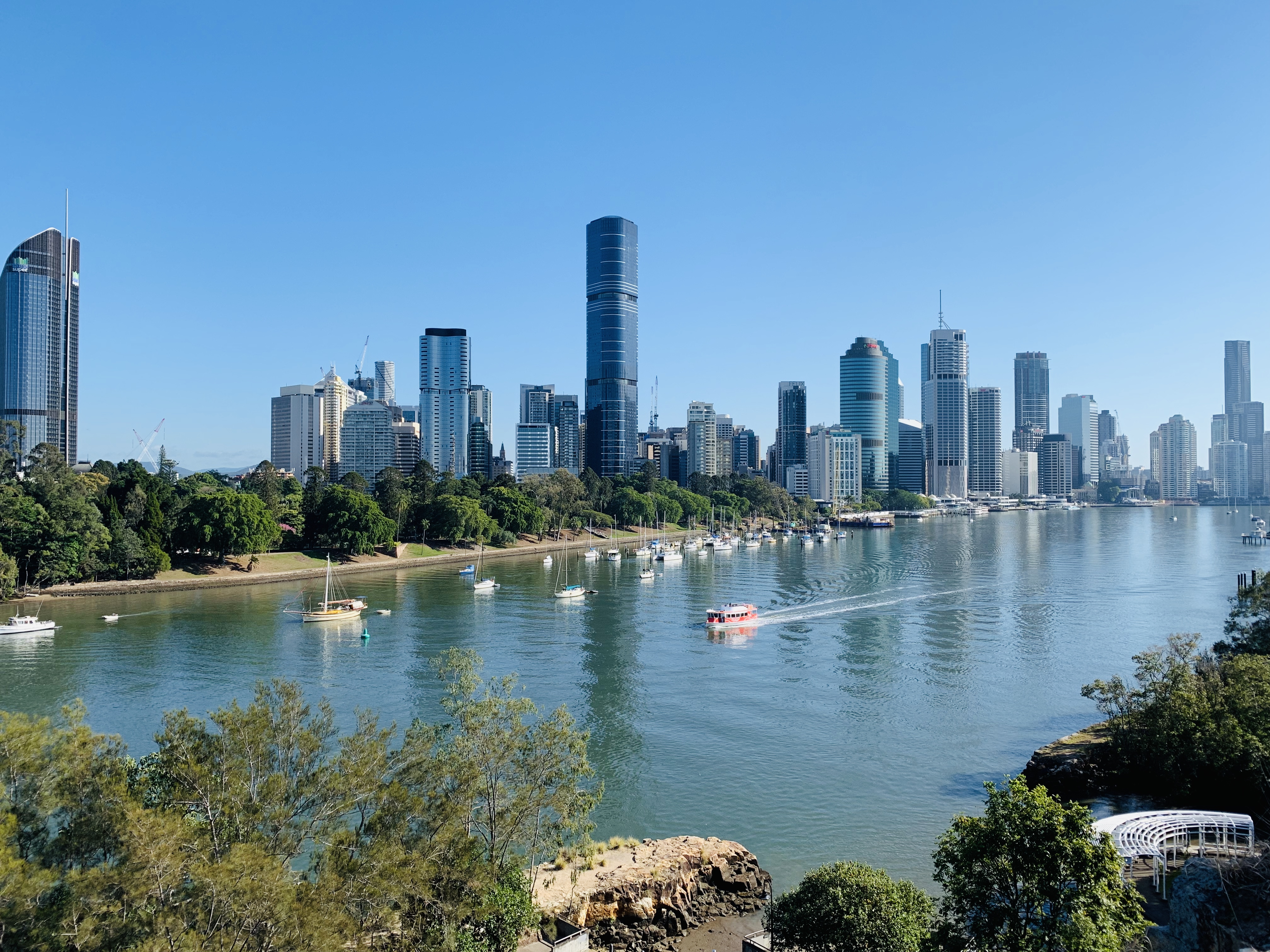
- Brisbane River from Kangaroo Point

- Location of river mouth in Queensland
- Etymology: Thomas Brisbane
- Native name: Maiwar

Location
- Country: Australia
- State: Queensland
- Region: South-East Queensland
- City: Brisbane

Physical characteristics
- Source: Mount Stanley
  - location: east of Nanango
  - coordinates: 26°39′S 152°22′E
  - elevation: 213 m (699 ft)
- Mouth: Moreton Bay
  - location: east of Brisbane
  - coordinates: 27°24′S 153°9′E
  - elevation: 0 m (0 ft)
- Length: 344 km (214 mi)
- Basin size: 13,652.3 km^{2} (5,271.2 mi^{2})
- Discharge
  - location: Near mouth
  - average: 51.2 m^{3}/s (1,620 GL/a)

Basin features
- River system: Brisbane River
- Tributaries
  - left: Stanley River, Moggill Creek, Breakfast Creek
  - right: Lockyer Creek, Bremer River, Oxley Creek, Norman Creek, Bulimba Creek

The Brisbane River (Turrbal: Maiwar) is the longest river in South East Queensland, Australia. It flows through the city of Brisbane, before emptying into Moreton Bay on the Coral Sea. John Oxley discovered the river in 1823 and named it after the Governor of New South Wales, Sir Thomas Brisbane. The penal colony of Moreton Bay later adopted the same name, eventually becoming the present city of Brisbane. The river is a tidal estuary and the water is brackish from its mouth through the majority of the Brisbane metropolitan area westward to the Mount Crosby Weir. The river is wide and navigable throughout the Brisbane metropolitan area. It is affectionately known by locals as the "Brown Snake", on account of its silty waters and long, winding course.

The river travels 344 km (214 mi) from Mount Stanley. The river is dammed by the Wivenhoe Dam, forming Lake Wivenhoe, the main water supply for Brisbane. The waterway is a habitat for the rare Queensland lungfish, Brisbane River cod (extinct), and bull sharks.

Early travellers along the waterway admired the natural beauty, abundant fish and rich vegetation along its banks. From 1862 the Brisbane River has been dredged for navigation purposes. The river served as an important carriageway between Brisbane and Ipswich before a railway linking the towns was built in 1875. By the late 1920s, water quality in the river had significantly deteriorated.

Multiple major floods occurred in 1893. In 1974, the most damaging flood on record occurred, causing the 66,000-tonne vessel Robert Miller (largest ship ever built on the river) to break free from its mooring. Other major floods occurred in January 2011 and February 2022.

Extensive port facilities have been constructed on the Fisherman Islands, now known as the Port of Brisbane, located at the mouth of the river on Moreton Bay. There are 16 major bridges that cross the river. The Clem Jones Tunnel, opened in 2010, is the river's first underground crossing for road transport. The CityCat and KittyCat ferry services deliver passengers along the inner-city reaches of the river.

== Name ==
In 1823, John Oxley named the river after the Governor Thomas Brisbane while surveying the area to locate a new penal settlement. The name is of Scottish origin, dating from at least 1643, from their family lands at Rothiebrisbane, Aberdeenshire. This is the name now used by the Queensland Government.

Maiwar is the name of the river in the Turrbal language (the language of an Aboriginal group native to the Brisbane area). The name is also used for the inner-western state electorate of Maiwar.

According to Archibald Meston and Tom Petrie in 1901, the Aboriginal people of the Brisbane area did not have a single name for the river, but rather they named individual reaches and bends.

== Course ==
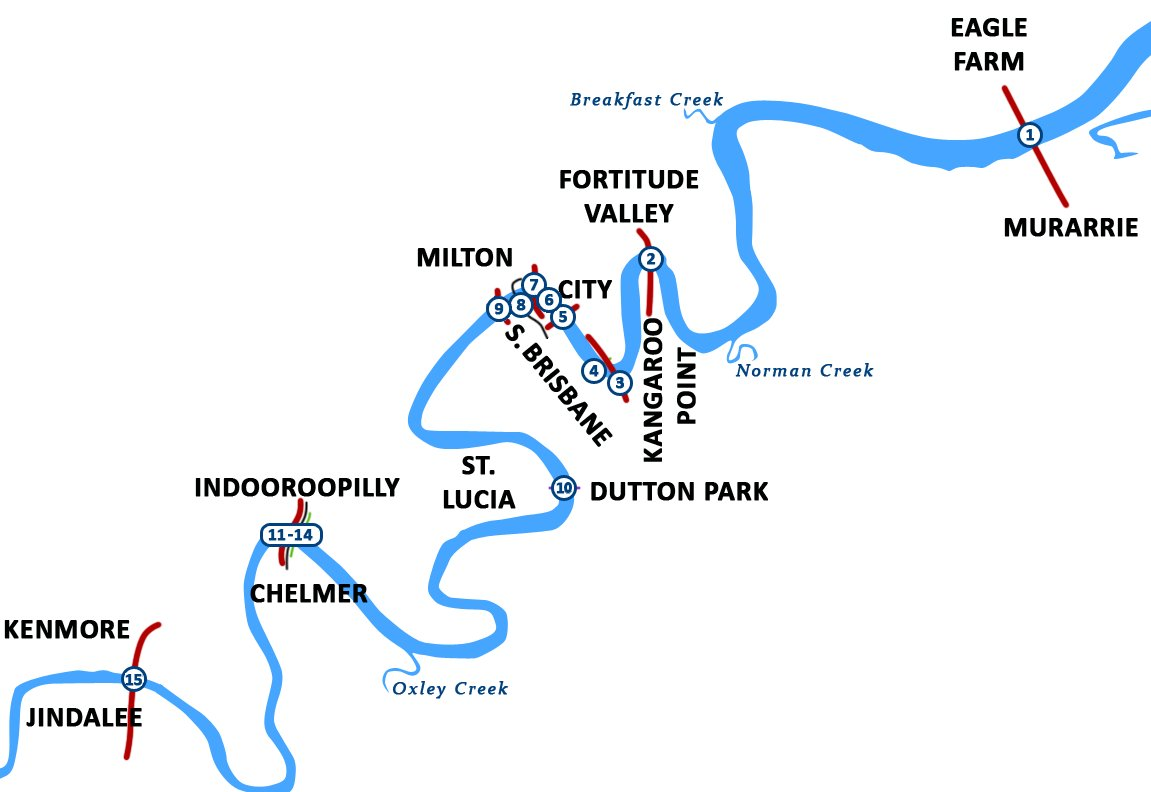
Course of the lower reaches of the Brisbane River from Ipswich to Moreton Bay. Legend Brisbane River and Moreton Bay Road bridges Rail bridges Pedestrian only bridges Bus and pedestrian only bridges

The Brisbane River East and West branches traditionally have their headwaters in the ranges east of Kingaroy. The two branches merge into a single watercourse south of Mount Stanley. Using an alternative modern definition, the source is located at the top of Fig Tree Gully in the Bunya Mountains, which are the headwaters of the river's longest tributary Cooyar Creek. Water from the highest point in the catchment has fallen on the Bunya Mountains, 992m above sea level

The junction of Cooyar Creek and Brisbane River is south of Avoca Vale, and the river then makes its way south past townships including Linville, Moore and Toogoolawah before being joined by the Stanley River, just south of Somerset Dam.

The river runs from there into Lake Wivenhoe, created by the Wivenhoe Dam. Beyond the dam, the river meanders eastward, meeting the Bremer River near Ipswich, then making its way through Brisbane's western suburbs, including Jindalee, Indooroopilly and Toowong.

The Brisbane River then flows past wharves including Pinkenba Wharf and Portside Wharf, past Bulwer Island and Luggage Point through the Port of Brisbane and into southern Bramble Bay an embayment of Moreton Bay.

=== Kangaroo Point Cliffs ===
On the southern side of the river, opposite Gardens Point, are the Kangaroo Point Cliffs; made from Triassic aged volcanic rock of rhyolite composition called Brisbane tuff. The Kangaroo Point Cliffs were created by a quarrying operation that, according to Allan Cunninghams' Field Book, was underway prior to 1829 when he observed a "stone wharf presumably used for landing the blocks of stone ferried across the river for the construction of buildings in the settlement". This was in the vicinity of Edward Street ferry terminal. Quarrying this volcanic rock formed part of the hard labour undertaken by the convicts of the Moreton Bay Penal Settlement, which not only provided the convicts with the punishment of hard labour but also provided the settlement with a useful building material. Many of the early buildings including the Commissariat Store, Brisbane were built by convicts using tuff from this quarry. After the penal settlement was closed, the Petrie family leased the cliffs and quarried the tuff for use in their construction projects, but ultimately quarrying this material became uneconomic without the free labour of the convicts.

The volcanic rock Ignimbrite which formed the cliffs was deposited in the Triassic period about 220 million years ago. They currently form the banks of the Brisbane River.

=== Reaches ===
A number of the reaches of the Brisbane River are named, including the following listed below (from upstream to downstream), together with their location relative to tributaries of the river and river crossings:

Reach name	Suburb(s)	Coordinates	Image	Notes
Dalys Reach	Karalee; Anstead	27.554°S 152.849°E		
Bremer River
Moggill Reach	Riverview; Moggill	27.590°S 152.856°E	Moggill Ferry Reserve was completely under water after the 2022 Flood	
Six Mile Creek
Redbank Reach	Moggill; Redbank	27.590°S 152.865°E	Muddy Brisbane river covered with debris after days of raining	
Goodna Creek
Goodna Reach	Goodna; Moggill	27.594°S 152.891°E	Goodna Boat Ramp in May 2023	
Woogaroo Creek
Cockatoo Reach	Moggill; Wacol	27.588°S 152.898°E	Cockatoo Island of Brisbane River	
Wolston Creek
Goggs Reach	Riverhills; Bellbowrie	27.565°S 152.898°E	Newcomb Park, Riverhills QLD	
Popes Reach	Riverhills; Bellbowrie	27.558°S 152.901°E		
Pullen Pullen Creek
Pullen Reach	Westlake; Pinjarra Hills; Bellbowrie	27.550°S 152.904°E	Riverview Farm Park on 11 March 2022	
Two Mile Reach	Westlake; Pinjarra Hills	27.543°S 152.915°E		
Mount Ommaney Creek
Mount Ommaney Reach	Jindalee; Mount Ommaney; Pinjarra Hills	27.535°S 152.927°E		
Moggill Creek
Centenary Bridge
Mermaid Reach	Fig Tree Pocket; Kenmore; Jindalee; Indooroopilly	27.527°S 152.948°E		
Sherwood Reach	Fig Tree Pocket; Sherwood	27.528°S 152.971°E		
Chelmer Reach	Chelmer; Fig Tree Pocket; Indooroopilly	27.5108°S 152.9675°E		
Walter Taylor Bridge
Indooroopilly Railway Bridge
Albert Bridge
Jack Pesch Bridge
Indooroopilly Reach	Indooroopilly; Chelmer	27.516°S 152.987°E		
Canoe Reach	Indooroopilly; Yeronga	27.521°S 153.009°E		
Long Pocket Reach	Indooroopilly; Yeronga; Fairfield	27.510°S 152.999°E		
Cemetery Reach	St Lucia; Dutton Park	27.498°S 153.020°E		
Eleanor Schonell Bridge
St Lucia Reach	St Lucia; Highgate Hill	27.491°S 153.003°E		
Toowong Reach	Toowong; Auchenflower; West End	27.483°S 152.997°E		
Milton Reach	Milton; Auchenflower; West End	27.474°S 153.005°E		
Go Between Bridge
Merivale Bridge
William Jolly Bridge
Kurilpa Bridge
Victoria Bridge
South Brisbane Reach	South Brisbane; Brisbane CBD	27.473°S 153.021°E		
Goodwill Bridge
Captain Cook Bridge
Town Reach	Brisbane CBD; Kangaroo Point	27.474°S 153.032°E		
Petrie Bight	Brisbane CBD; Fortitude Valley; Kangaroo Point	27.466°S 153.032°E		
Story Bridge
Shafston Reach	Kangaroo Point; New Farm	27.47°S 153.039°E		
Norman Creek
Humbug Reach	New Farm; Norman Park; East Brisbane	27.473°S 153.051°E		
Bulimba Reach	Bulimba; Newstead	27.449°S 153.05°E		
Breakfast Creek
Hamilton Reach	Hamilton; Bulimba; Morningside	27.440°S 153.055°E		
Quarries Reach	Eagle Farm; Murarrie	27.446°S 153.094°E		
Sir Leo Hielscher Bridges
Bulimba Creek
Lytton Reach	Lytton; Pinkenba	27.427°S 153.126°E		
Quarantine Flats Reach	Lytton; Pinkenba	27.408°S 153.148°E		
Moreton Bay

=== Tributaries ===
The following major tributaries flow into the Brisbane River from the north; Breakfast Creek, Moggill Creek and the Stanley River. On the southside Bulimba Creek, Norman Creek, Oxley Creek, Bremer River and Lockyer Creek waterways enter the Brisbane River. The following smaller creeks also flow into the river; Cressbrook Creek, Cooyar Creek, Cubberla Creek, Black Snake Creek, Wolston Creek, Woogaroo Creek, Goodna Creek, Six Mile Creek, Pullen Pullen Creek and Kholo Creek.

== History ==
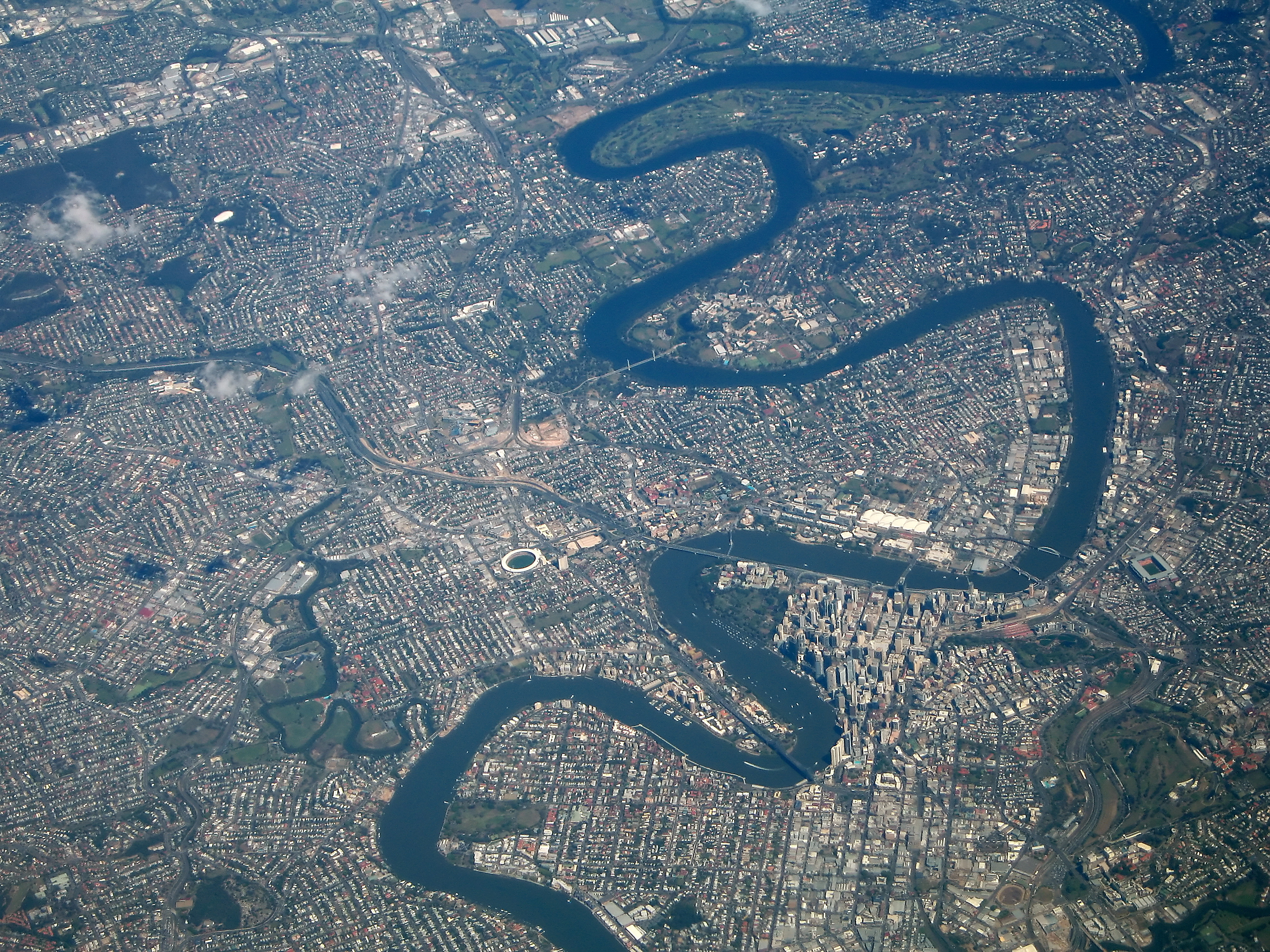
Aerial view of Brisbane and the Brisbane River

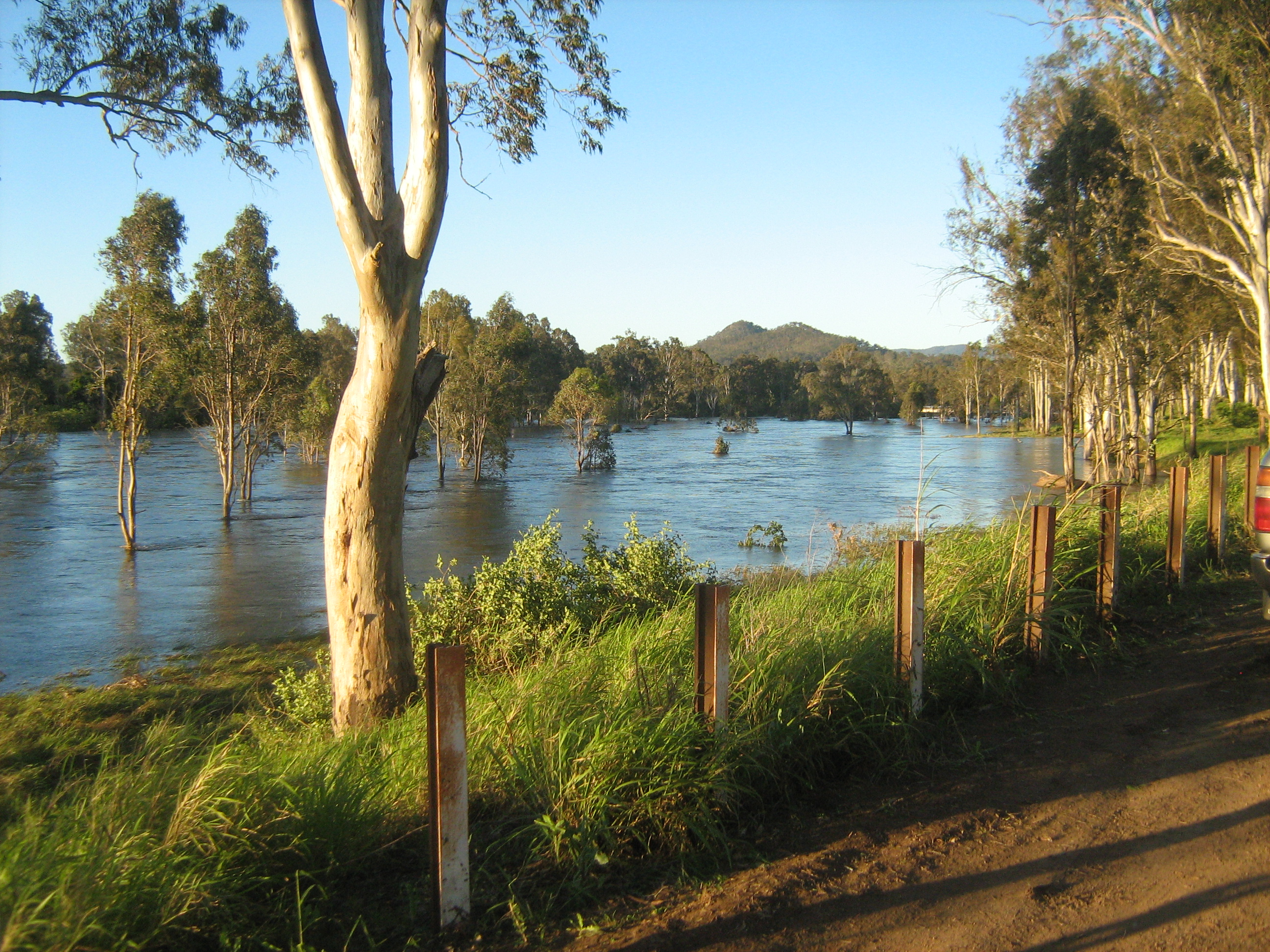
The Brisbane River a short distance downstream of Wivenhoe Dam near Fernvale, while the spillway is open

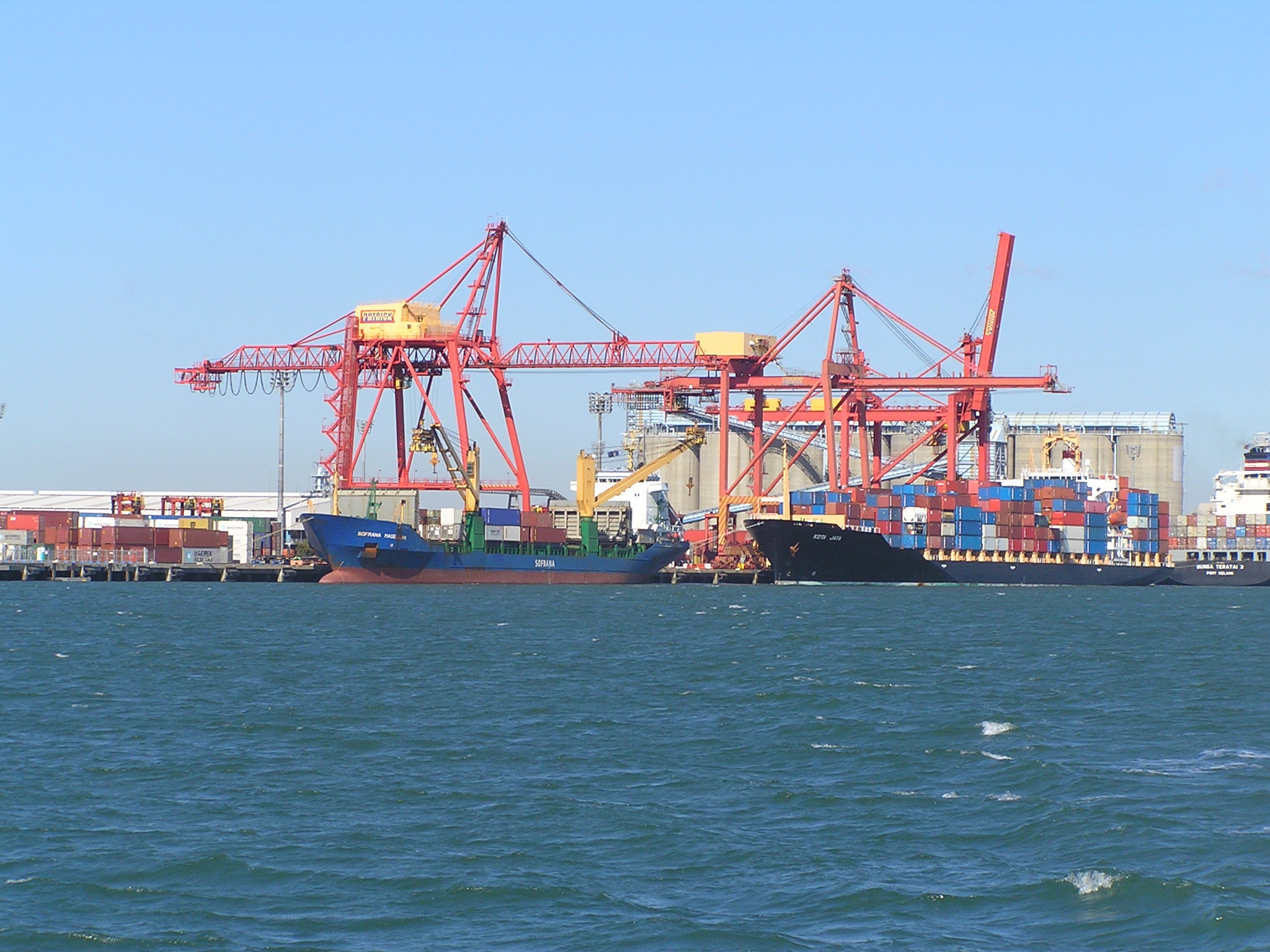
The Port of Brisbane at the mouth of the Brisbane River on Moreton Bay

Before European settlement, the Brisbane River was spiritually important and a vital food source for the Aboriginal people of the Turrbal people, primarily through fishing in the tidal sections downstream. Additionally, fishing and fire-stick farming took place in the upper reaches of the river where there was freshwater, in some seasons.

Four European navigators, namely James Cook, Matthew Flinders, John Bingle and William Edwardson, all visited Moreton Bay but failed to discover the river. The exploration by Flinders took place during his expedition from Port Jackson north to Hervey Bay in 1799. He spent a total of 15 days in the area, touching down at Woody Point and several other spots, but failed to discover the mouth of the river although there were suspicions of its existence. This is consistent with accounts of many other rivers along the east coast of Australia, which could not be found by seaward exploration but were discovered by inland travellers.

On 21 March 1823, four ticket-of-leave convicts sailing south from Sydney on a timber getting mission to Illawarra, Thomas Pamphlett, John Finnegan, Richard Parsons and John Thompson were blown north by a storm. They went 21 days without water, continuing north in the belief they had been blown south, during which time Thompson died. They landed on Moreton Island on 16 April and made it to the mainland on the south of the Brisbane River. They immediately began trekking north in order to return to Sydney, still believing themselves to be somewhere south of Jervis Bay. Subsequently, they became the first known Europeans to discover the river, stumbling across it somewhere near the entrance. They walked upstream along its banks for nearly a month before making their first crossing at Canoe Reach, the junction of Oxley Creek. It was here they stole a small canoe left by the Turrbal people of the region.

John Oxley was Surveyor General of New South Wales when, in the same year and under orders from Governor Brisbane, he sailed into Moreton Bay looking for a suitable new site for a convict settlement to be established. An entry in Oxley's diary on 19 November 1823 describes his surprise meeting with one of the shipwrecked men:

"We rounded the Point Skirmish about 5 o'clock and observed a number of natives running along the beach towards the vessel, the foremost much lighter in colour than the rest. We were to the last degree astonished when he came abreast the vessel to hear him hail us in good English."

By that time Pamphlett and Finnegan were living with natives near Bribie Island. Parsons, who had continued to travel north in search of Sydney, was picked up by Oxley on 11 September 1824.

On 2 December 1823, Oxley and Stirling, with Finnegan as a somewhat reluctant guide, entered the river and sailed upstream as far as present-day Goodna. Oxley noted the abundant fish and tall pine trees. Early European explorers marvelled at the sheer natural beauty they witnessed while travelling up the lower reaches.

Reports by early European explorers such as Allan Cunningham and Oxley indicate rainforest once fringed the Brisbane River and its major tributaries, especially on the broader floodplains such as St Lucia and Seventeen Mile Rocks. The coastal lowlands were extensively vegetated with Melaleuca woodlands in low lying, poorly drained coastal areas. When first described by Europeans, the lower reaches of the Brisbane River were fringed by a mosaic of open forest, closed forest and rainforest.

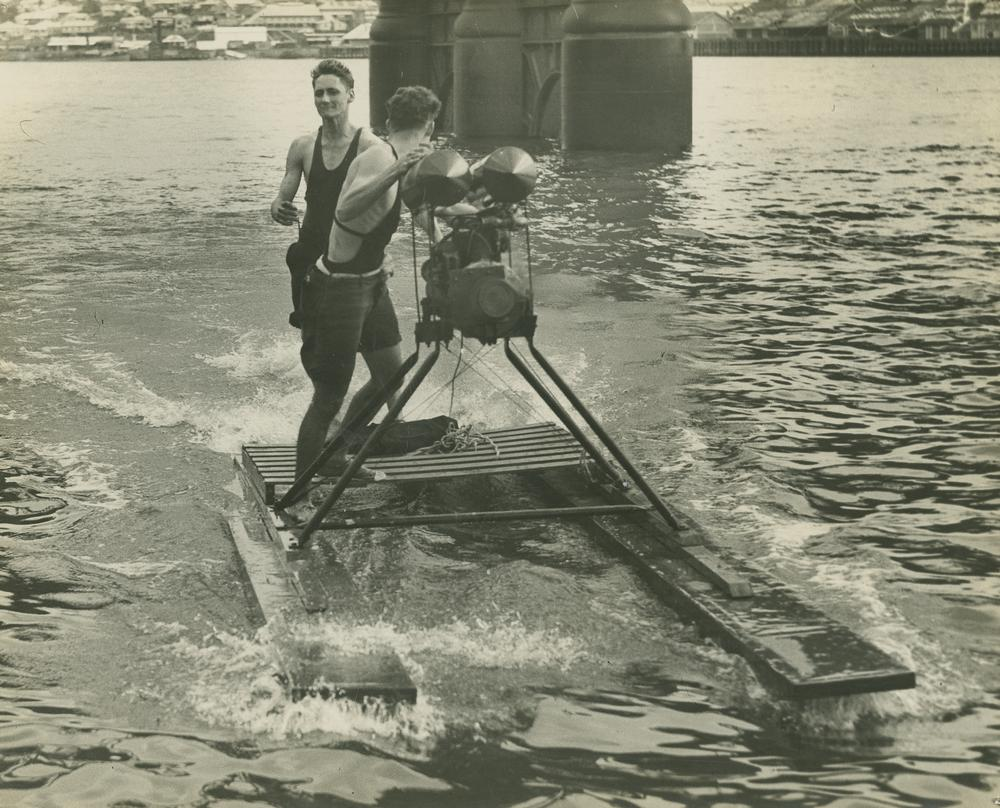
A historic photo of the Brisbane River

In the same year of 1823, the river was named after Sir Thomas Brisbane, the then Governor of New South Wales. Upon the establishment of a local settlement in 1824, other explorers such as Allan Cunningham, Patrick Logan and Major Edmund Lockyer made expeditions and surveys further upstream, and, in May 1825, the Moreton Bay penal colony at Redcliffe under the command of Heny Miller relocated to North Quay.

The entrance to the Brisbane River was surveyed and marked with buoys in May 1825 by Pilot John M Gray sent from Sydney for the purpose by Governor Sir Thomas Brisbane. Gray also transferred the soldiers and convicts from the First Settlement at Redcliffe at this time. The first small private wharves were built on the river in about 1848. and the once popular, shark-proof river baths were first built in 1857 at Kangaroo Point. By 1850, nearly all the prime alluvial lands in the Brisbane River valley had been taken up by settlers.

From 1862 the Brisbane River has been dredged for navigation purposes. Throughout much of the 20th century large quantities of sand and gravel were extracted from the estuary of the river. Since the rate of materials being deposited is not as high as that which was removed, the river has acted as a subaqueous mine.

In 1865, water police were stationed on board Proserpine, a hulk moored at the mouth of the Brisbane River.

In 1866, there was a breakwater built at the junction of the Bremer and Brisbane rivers that was designed to stop shingle from blocking the access to the Bremer's boat channel. The first pile light using kerosene was built in 1882. The steel framed light also served as an early port signal station.

In February 1896, one of the river's worst disasters occurred with the capsize of the ferry Pearl (which struck the anchor chain of the government yacht Lucinda) with the loss of around 40 lives.

=== 20th century ===
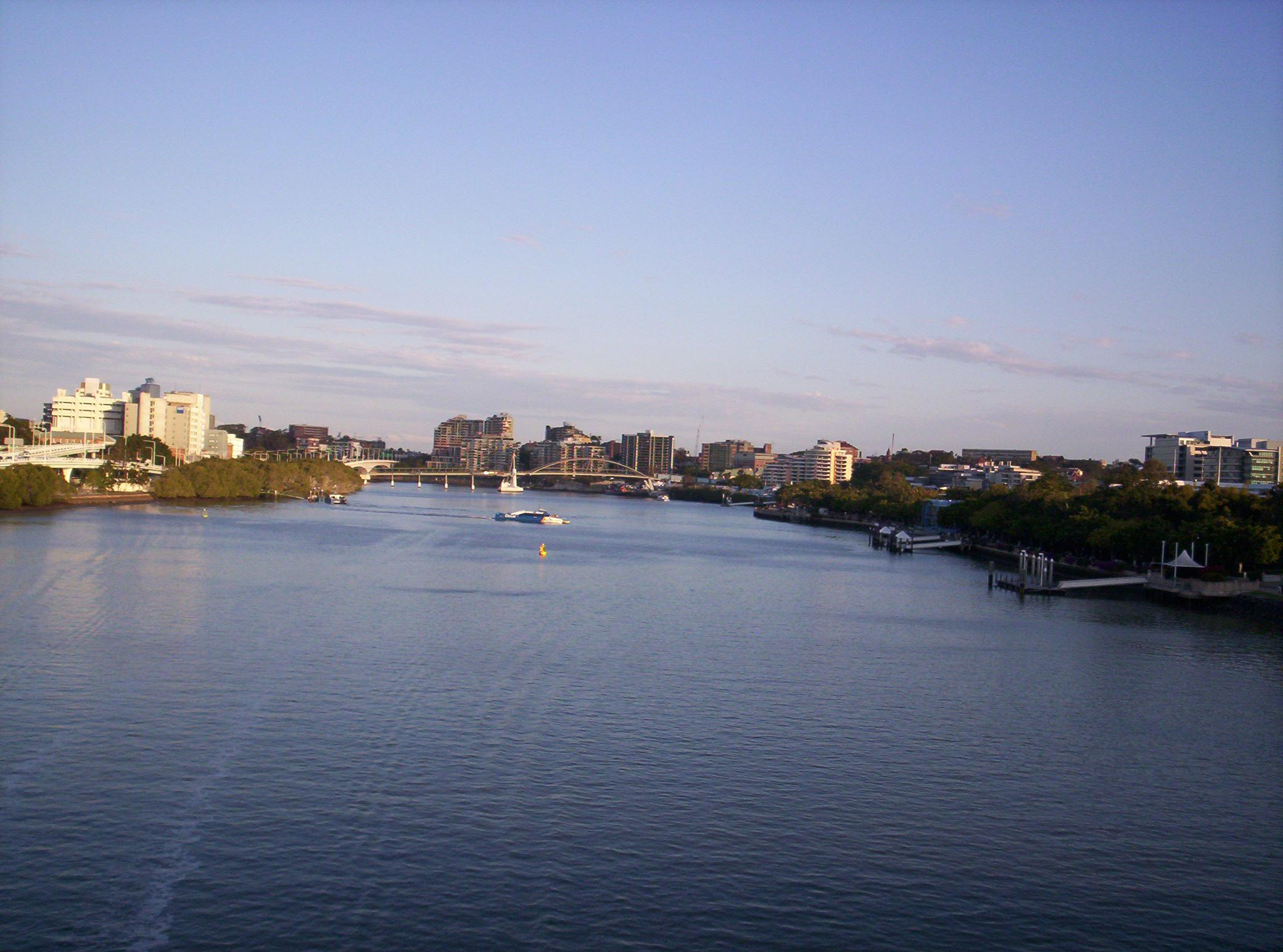
Brisbane River, from Victoria Bridge, showing Goodwill Bridge and a CityCat ferry

By 1928, due to the early settlement of Brisbane, the water quality had deteriorated to the point where several public baths had to cease sourcing water from the river. Yet even up to the 1930s, the water was said to be very clear, with reports of people seeing the river bed 5 to 6 m (16 to 20 ft) below the surface. Swimming was once popular at Oxley Point under the Walter Taylor Bridge. In the middle tidal reaches in more recent times, visibility has been about 0.2 m (8 in). As Brisbane grew, the condition of the river worsened until at its worst it was no more than an open sewer and waste dump. The banks were cleared of timber and introduced animals and plants rapidly changed the river's ecology to its detriment.

On 25 March 1941, a USA goodwill flotilla arrived in the city docking at wharves along the river and built Naval Base Brisbane. The largest ship built on the river was the Robert Miller. Construction was near complete when the 66,000 tonne vessel became un-moored in the 1974 Brisbane flood. In 1977, Queen Elizabeth II switched on the Jubilee Fountain positioned in front of the proposed Queensland Cultural Centre. The jets pushed the floodlit river water up to 75 m (246 ft) in the air. The floating fountain sank late on the 31 December 1984. 1987 was proclaimed the "Year of the River" by the Lord Mayor of Brisbane at the time, Sallyanne Atkinson.

Over the 20th century, enough obstacles, sand and gravel had been removed from the river that its channel depth increased the tidal flow and tidal range upstream.

=== 21st century ===
On 9 August 2020, it was discovered that Google Maps accidentally changed the Brisbane River name to Ithaca Creek after a complaint that Ithaca Creek was incorrectly named Brisbane River.

=== Floods ===
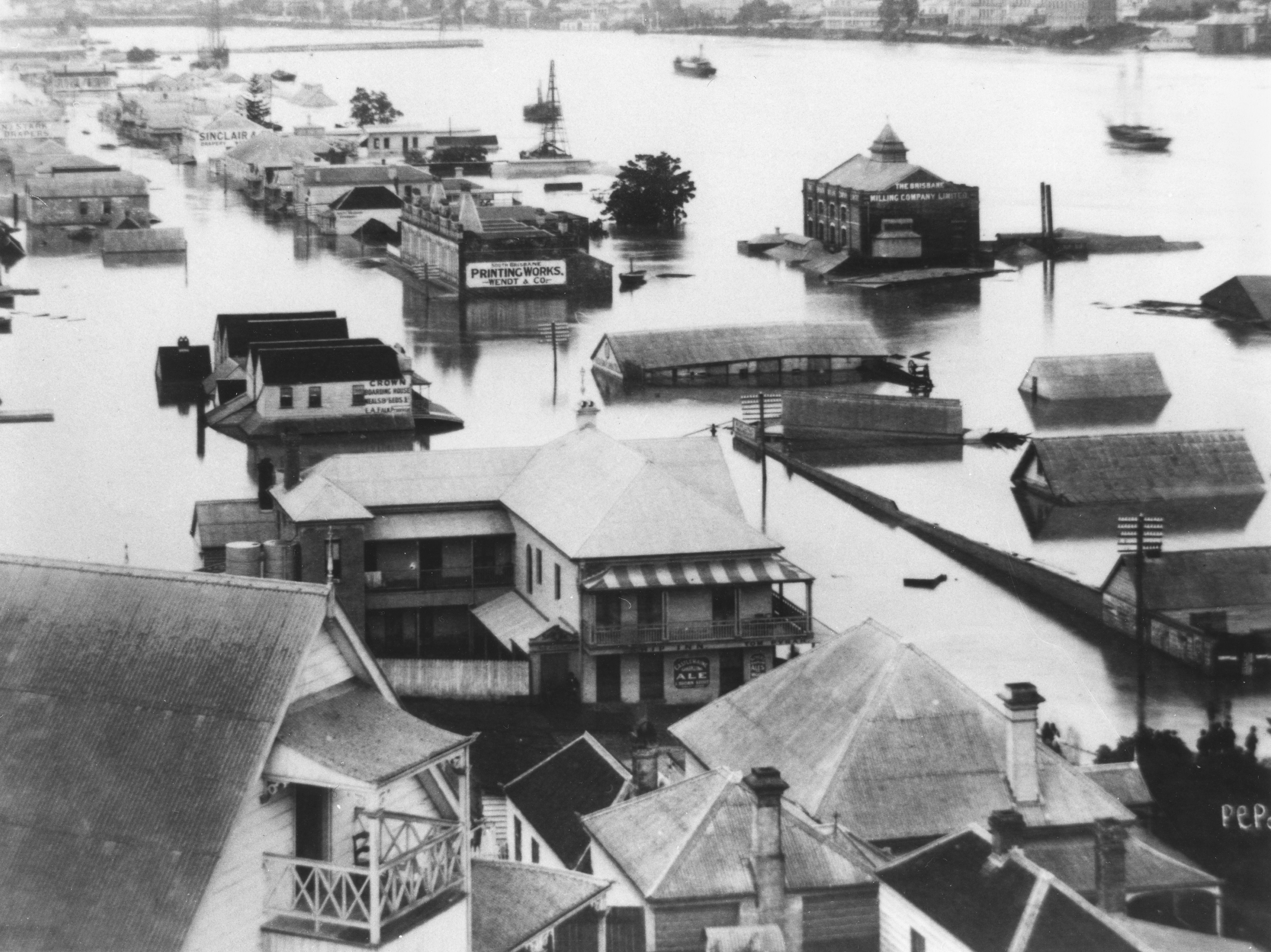
The 1893 Brisbane flood

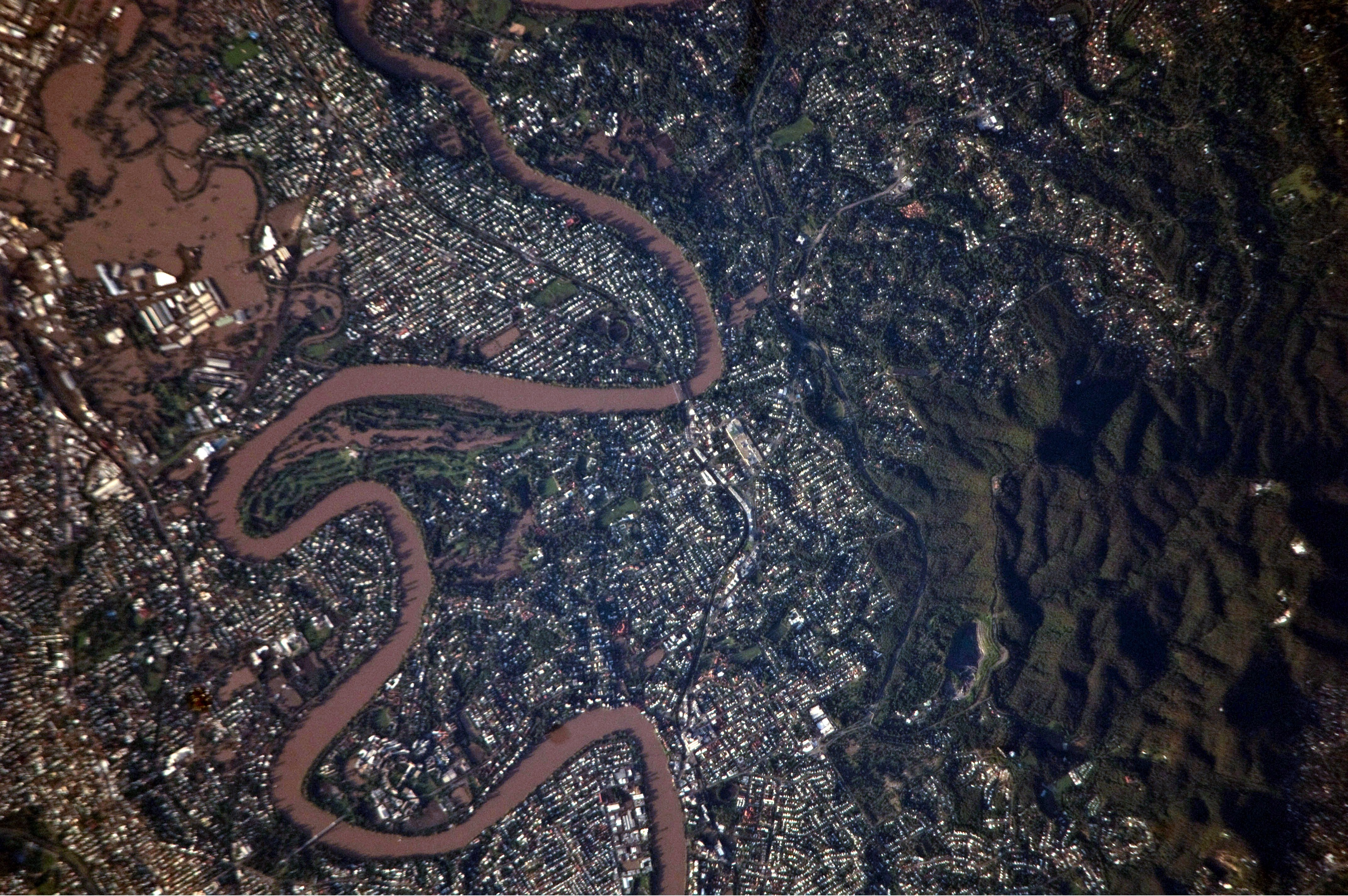
A NASA image of the 2011 flood. The top of the photo is oriented approximately to the southwest. The light-coloured rooftops of residences and other structures contrast sharply with green vegetation and brown, sediment laden flood-waters. Most visible low-lying areas are inundated by flood-water, perhaps the most striking being Rocklea (upper left). Yeronga (lower left) also has evident regions of flooding, as does a park and golf course located along a bend in the Brisbane River to the south of St Lucia (centre). Flooding becomes less apparent near the higher elevations of Mount Coot-tha (right).

The Brisbane River floods frequently, although the occurrence and magnitude of flooding has diminished following the construction of the Wivenhoe Dam on the upper reaches of the river.

Past floods have resulted in both deepening and reduction in river depth, creation of new sand banks and shoals as well as increased transport of suspended sediment from upstream. Before the invention of modern dredging techniques the sediment deposited by flooding created hazards to ships navigating the river. Even medium-sized vessels no longer travel up the Brisbane River beyond the city reach, and dredging of the upper reaches has ceased, allowing the river to recover substantially from the fine silt dislodged by gravel and sand extraction.

Significant floods have occurred several times since the European settlement of Brisbane. There have been 12 Major flood peaks (over 3.5m) recorded at the Brisbane gauge since records began in 1841, including:

- 14 January 1841, with a maximum river level of 8.43m at the gauge, the highest flood level recorded to date
- 10 January 1844, 7.1m flood peak at Brisbane.
- February 1863, 3.8m flood peak
- January 1887, 3.8m flood peak
- July 1889, 3.8m flood peak
- March 1890, 5.3m flood peak
- February 1893, a sequence of flood peaks (8.35 metres and 8.09 metres) over two weeks saw the highest recorded flood level in the Brisbane central business district. Seven lives were lost in the Eclipse Colliery at North Ipswich as a direct result of the flooding. Several other people drowned as well.
- June 1897, 5.0m flood peak
- February 1907, 3.6m flood peak
- 27 January 1974, the largest flood to affect Brisbane City in the 20th Century, with a level of 5.45 metres

Post construction of Wivenhoe Dam

- 11 January 2011 with a level of 4.45 metres
- 28 February 2022, 4.0m flood peak

Flooding along the Brisbane River has the potential to be devastating, as documented in 1974, 2011 and 2022. For much of the river's length its banks are relatively high, but topped by a broad plain. The river's meandering course means that flood waters from upstream cannot be quickly discharged into Moreton Bay. Thus higher than normal flows cause river levels to rise rapidly and once the top of the banks are breached the floodwaters can spread over wide areas of the city.

=== Navigation ===
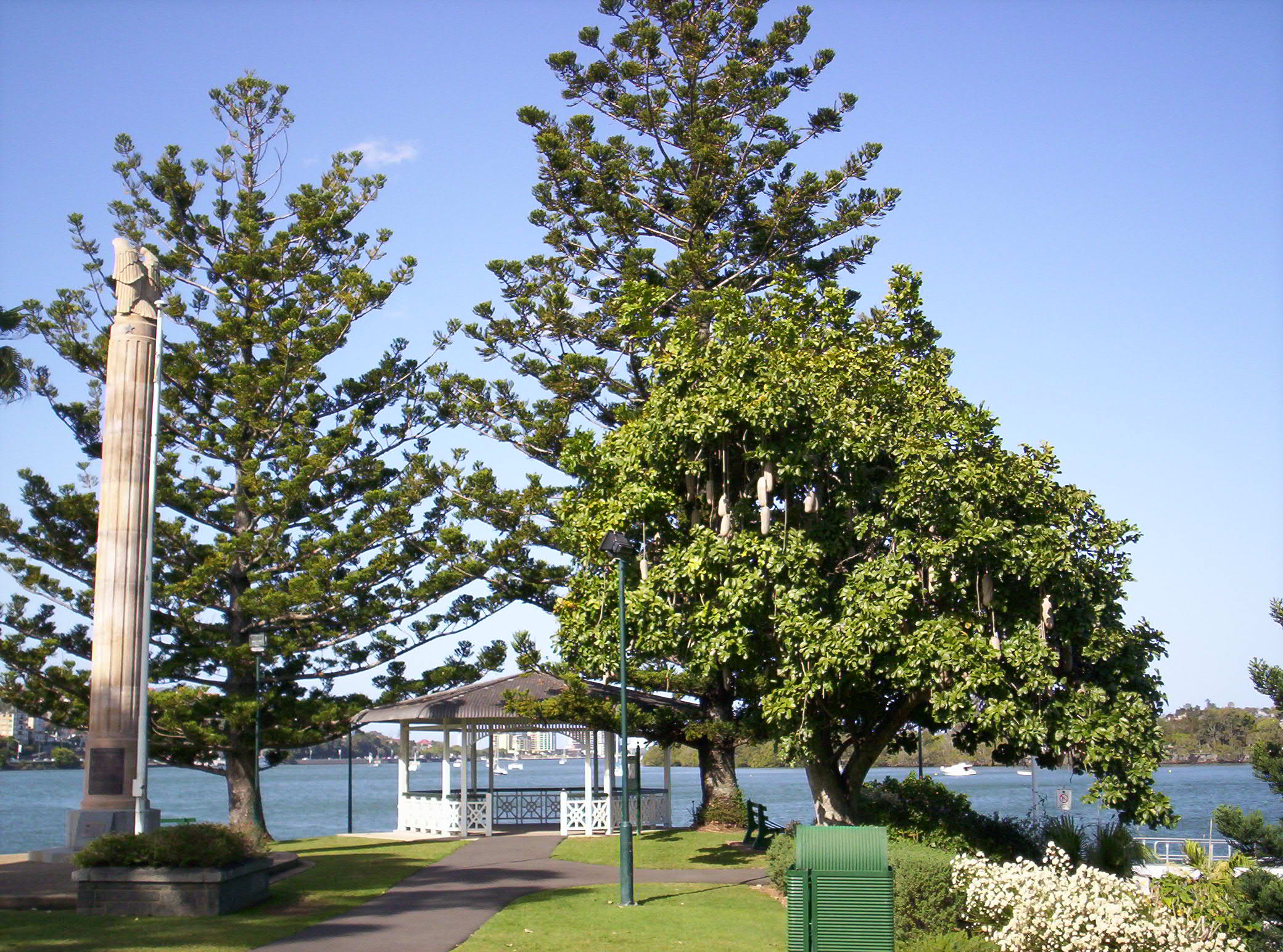
Brisbane River, taken from the grounds of Newstead House

There has been much dredging and widening work done over the years to allow ships to transport cargo to and from Brisbane. The river is no longer dredged. The river served as an important carriageway between Brisbane and Ipswich before a railway linking the towns was built in 1875. By early 1825 buoys were being laid along the South Passage and shortly after that the first pilots were commissioned to guide ships entering from Moreton Bay and another service for those travelling upstream. Flying boats used the waters of the river in Pinkenba, to take-off for domestic and international destinations in the 1930s.

The river depth was progressively increased and narrow points widened to allow larger vessels into the river and further upstream. For navigation and safety reasons the Seventeen Mile Rocks were completely removed in 1965 after numerous partially successful attempts in the past. The northern river bank at the mouth of the river has undergone reclamation projects over the years, especially in the suburbs of Hamilton and Pinkenba. More recently, extensive facilities for the Port of Brisbane have been constructed on Fisherman's Island which has also seen significant land reclamation into the bay.

Early rivers crossings were made using small oared boat ferries, beginning in 1843, followed by steam ferries. In 1865 the first Victoria Bridge, later destroyed in a flood, was built across the river. Professor Hawken of the University of Queensland undertook a study in 1914 to identify the future crossing points for the river.

Historically, the Brisbane River contained upstream bars and shallows and had a natural tidal limit of only 16 km (10 mi). The current tidal limit now extends 85 km (53 mi) upstream due to continual channel dredging.

== Crossings ==
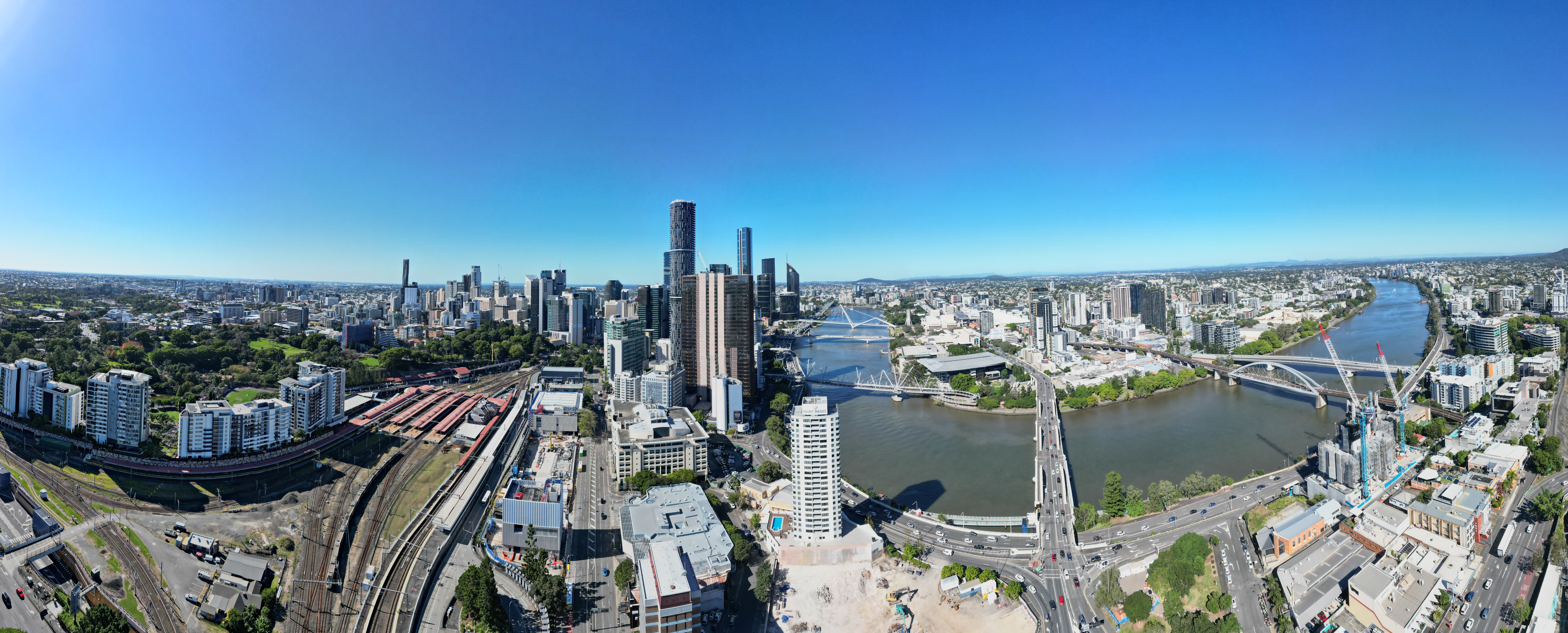
Aerial panorama of Brisbane city and its train station, and Brisbane River

The first bridge built across the Brisbane River was the original timber Victoria Bridge, opened in 1865 between Brisbane and South Brisbane. The current concrete Victoria Bridge is the 4th to be built on the site, the original bridge collapsed after marine borers weakened its timber piles, and the second was destroyed in the 1893 flood.

As of 2012 the Brisbane River is crossed by 16 major bridges (counting the new second Gateway, now Sir Leo Hielscher Bridge), including the historic 1940 Story Bridge and the tolled Sir Leo Hielscher Bridges. There are two other major bridges upstream (west) of Brisbane, on the D'Aguilar Highway and the Brisbane Valley Highway. The Clem Jones Tunnel, opened in 2010, is the river's first underground crossing for road transport.

The Moggill Ferry continues to provide a crossing for vehicles northeast of Ipswich.

The Albert Bridge was the first railway crossing of the Brisbane River, opened in 1876. It was destroyed in the 1893 flood and replaced by a 2 span design that is flood tolerant. A second bridge was built adjacent to it, opened in 1957 in conjunction with the quadruplication of the railway between Roma Street and Corinda. The Merivale Bridge, opened in 1978, connects the South Brisbane railway system to the City.

Four bridges have been built that cater for pedestrians and bicycles, being the Goodwill Bridge and Kurilpa Bridge in the City area, the Eleanor Schonell Bridge between Dutton Park and St Lucia (which also caters for public buses to the University of Queensland St Lucia campus), and the Jack Pesch Bridge between Indooroopilly and Chelmer. The Brisbane City Council has announced plans for a pedestrian and cycle only bridge between Kangaroo Point and the city.

=== Brisbane Riverwalk ===
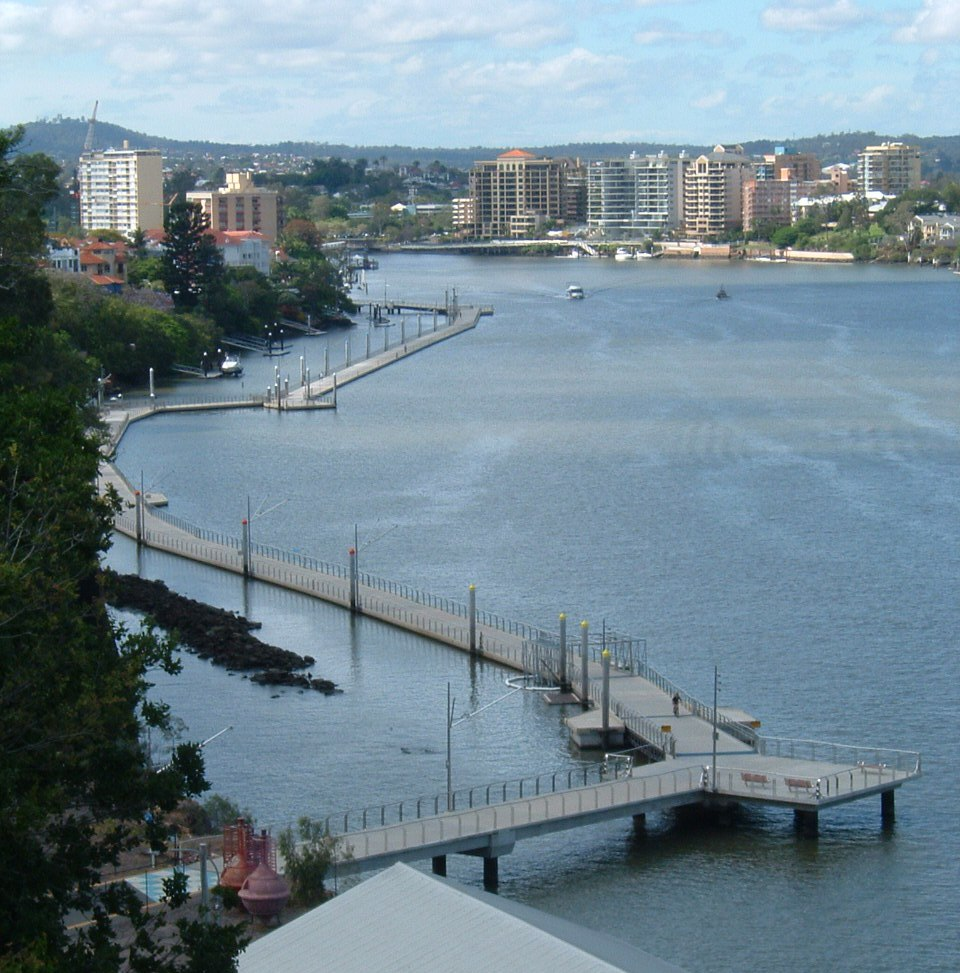
The former Brisbane Riverwalk

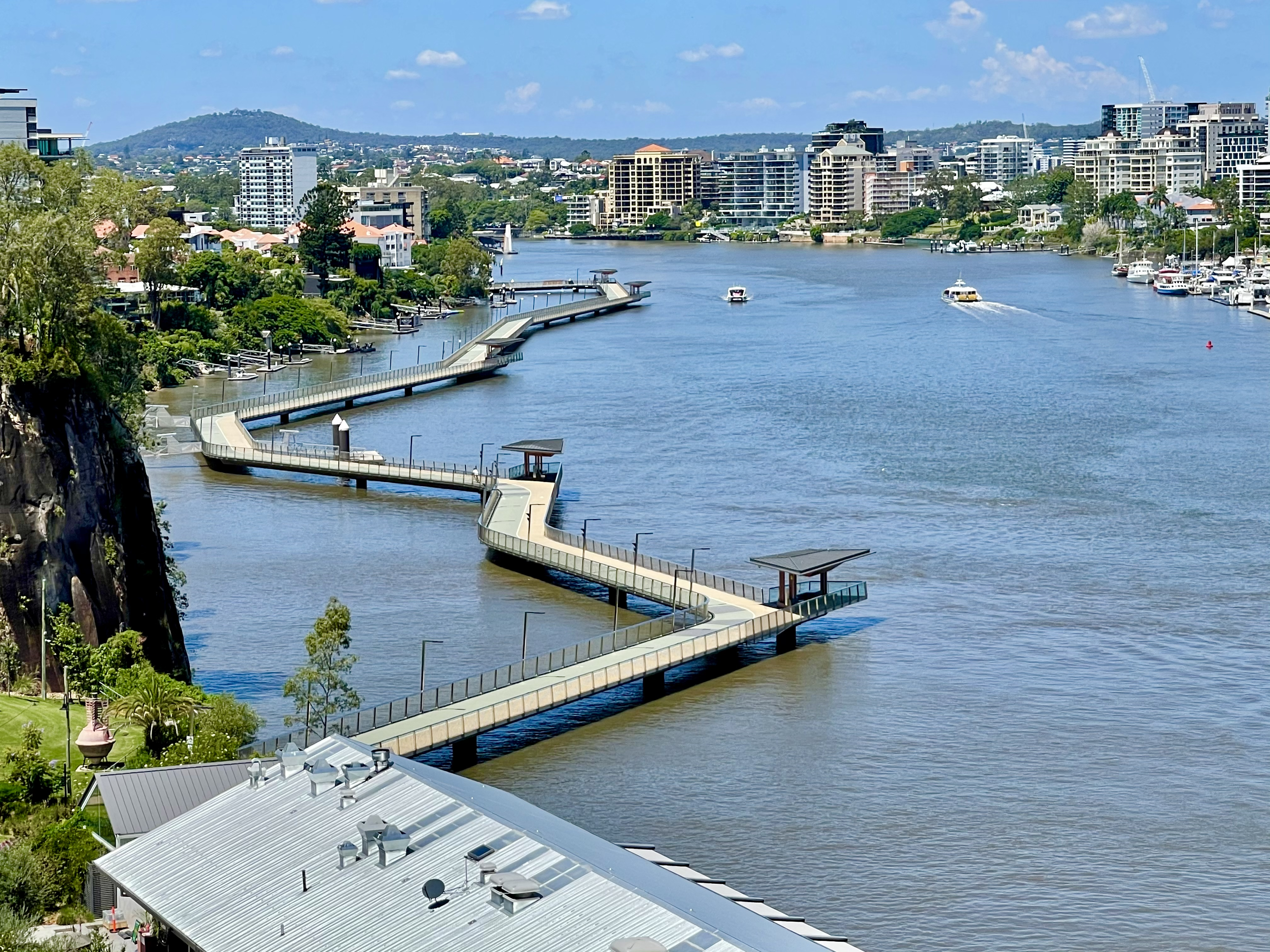
New Brisbane Riverwalk in 2021

The Brisbane City Council has developed a network of riverwalk pavements along the banks of the Brisbane River. The Riverwalk runs along much of the Brisbane River foreshore throughout the inner-city area, with the longest span running between Newstead and Toowong. Another popular stretch runs beneath the Kangaroo Point Cliffs between South Brisbane and Kangaroo Point. Several spans of the Riverwalk are built out over the Brisbane River.

An interesting section is the floating walkway between the Story Bridge and Merthyr Road New Farm. Brisbane City planners require many developers of formerly private riverfront blocks to create new sections of the Brisbane Riverwalk that are accessible to the public.

During the 2011 floods, the Lord Mayor of Brisbane, Campbell Newman authorised the destruction of the Brisbane Riverwalk to prevent it floating away and becoming a hazard downstream. The proposed demolition of the Riverwalk was later cancelled.

Early in the morning of 13 January 2011 a several hundred metre long section of the Riverwalk broke away from the main structure and floated downstream. Queensland Police temporarily closed the Sir Leo Hielscher Bridges (commonly known as the Gateway Bridge) several times as there were fears that sections of Riverwalk could collide with and damage the bridge. The largest part of the floating boardwalk was safely guided under the bridge by a tugboat and past other infrastructure before being safely secured. Other tugs and Water Police guided other Riverwalk sections under the bridge. The damaged Riverwalk was rebuilt as a fixed structure by the Brisbane City Council. The 18-month construction commenced in early 2013 and was completed in September 2014.

=== Cross river tunnel ===
The Clem Jones Tunnel is currently the only cross river tunnel built in Brisbane. It opened on 16 March 2010. The Cross River Rail tunnel is currently under construction and is expected to be complete in 2029.

== Environmental concerns ==
During the 19th century and early 20th century, the river's surface was periodically choked by large swathes of the noxious weed known as water hyacinth. The plant was originally imported from South America.

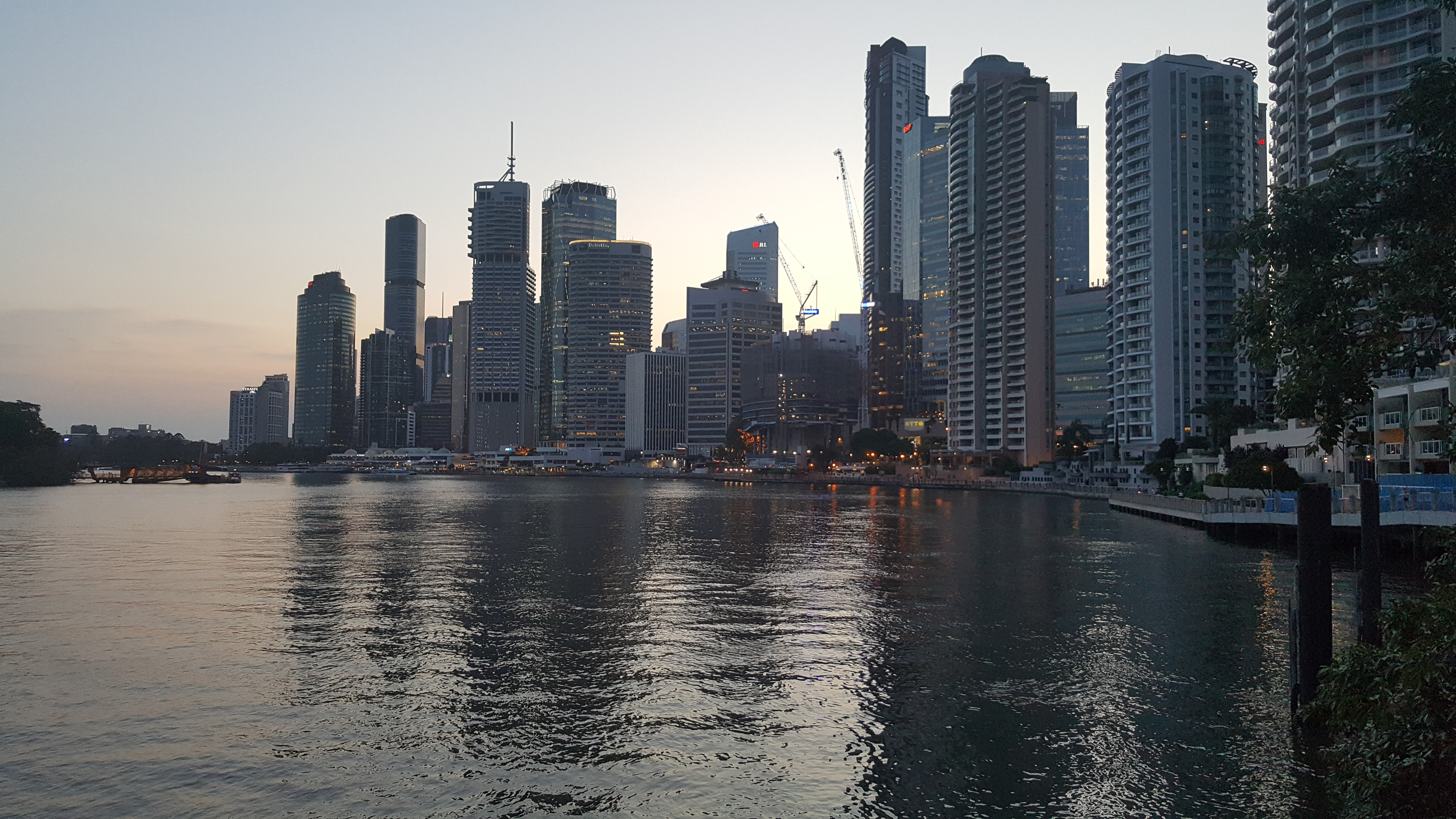
Brisbane River from Howard Smith Wharves

Environmentally, the river is in a poor condition and has been so for many years. In 2000, the Brisbane River estuary did not meet the national guidelines for environmental standards. The lower reaches received a very poor rating in the 2008 Healthy Waterways report, an annual assessment of river water quality. The major causes of pollution are excess nutrients, hydrocarbons, pesticides and bacteria which become concentrated in the river and its sediment after flowing off surrounding lands. The river is also considered too murky and it is not recommended to swim in its waters.

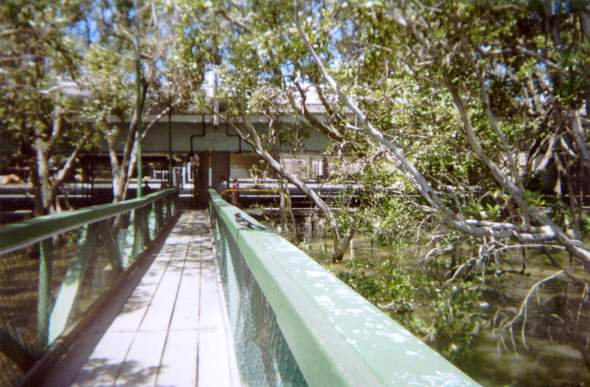
Mangroves on the Brisbane River at the CityCat wharf near the QUT

Beginning in the 1950s, the river was dredged for the purpose of extracting sand and gravel. The considerable impacts of that activity include increased turbidity and bank erosion. The effect of the artificial sediment load in Moreton Bay grew to concern environmentalists worried that sediment was choking sea grass paddocks which were grazing territory for dugong. Public outcry led to all commercial dredging being stopped by 1998. Non-extractive dredging continues in the Brisbane River in order to maintain its navigability.

In 2018, the water quality in the Brisbane River failed to meet many Queensland Government standards. Nitrogen and phosphorus exceeded the maximum levels in all tests conducted in the mid-Brisbane River catchment. Results in the lower- and upper- catchments found maximum levels exceeded for the majority of tests for nitrogen and nearly all tests for phosphorus. Nitrogen and phosphorus primarily enter the river as they are washed in from agriculture areas on the banks upstream.

In 2019, research at the University of Queensland indicated that the river's turbidity cycle (and murky brown colour) is principally driven by exchanges of mud between the channel and mudbanks. However, by planting Crinum pedunculatum in a line parallel to the channel and below the mean water level, the turbidity would reduce to such a degree that the river would appear clear and blue. To date, this has not been attempted by Brisbane City Council.

== Flora ==
The river has several important ecological areas where remnant populations of mangroves exist; these include areas around drainage culverts, in Breakfast Creek, New Farm, a small preserve at the city bend, near the Queensland University of Technology and around the shipping terminals at the river's terminus into Moreton Bay. These mangroves have recently become classified as protected nature reserves. The noxious water hyacinth weed is still growing in stretches between Fernvale and the Mount Crosby Weir but only poses a minimal risk to drinking water supplies.

== Fauna ==
=== Queensland lungfish ===
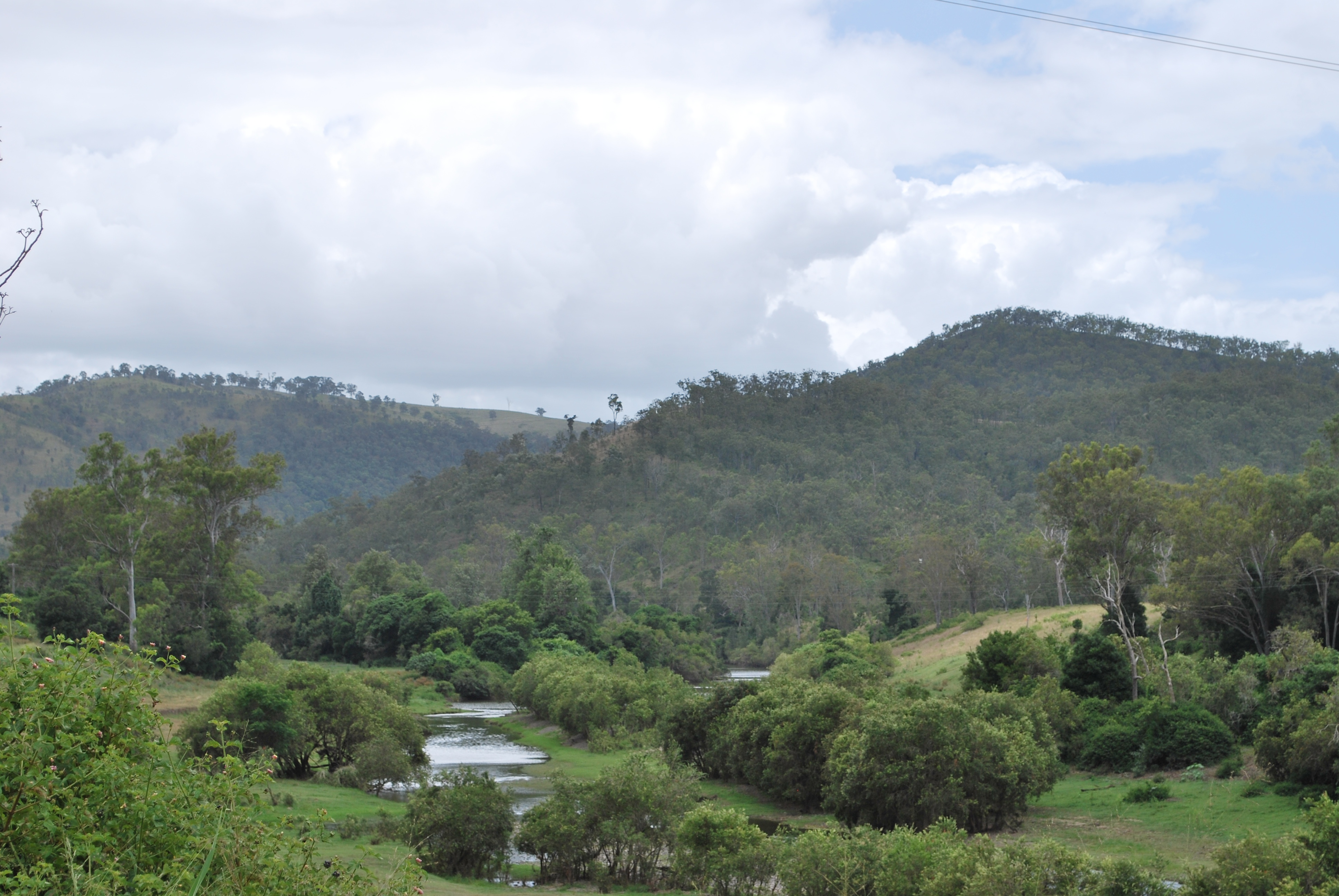
The Brisbane River at Linville, upstream from Lake Wivenhoe

In 1895–1896, the Queensland lungfish was only found in the Mary and Burnett river systems. Concerned about the species survival, it was introduced into other Queensland waterways with varying success. Self-sustaining populations of lungfish were successfully established in the Brisbane River, the Enoggera Reservoir and the North Pine River.

=== Brisbane River cod ===
The freshwater reaches of the Brisbane River once supported a unique species of cod, the Brisbane River cod, which was similar to Murray cod and closely related to eastern freshwater cod and Mary River cod. This unique native fish became extinct somewhere between the 1930s and 1950s due to habitat degradation and overfishing. The river has been restocked with cod from the Mary River.

=== Bull sharks ===
The Brisbane River is home to a very large population of bull sharks, thus swimming is not advised due to the dangers imposed by this predatory fish. Ipswich City Council warns against swimming as far up as Colleges Crossing. There have been four recorded shark attack deaths in the river (1862, 1880, 1901 and 1921), and numerous other fatal attacks in surrounding rivers and estuaries. There have also been numerous attacks on family pets, such as dogs. Bull sharks can grow up to between 7–11.5 feet (2.1–3.5 m) in length and be very aggressively territorial, which are unusual for a shark species because they can inhabit brackish water (containing less than 50% seawater) and are known to tolerate freshwater.

== Water Transport ==
The river is traversed by CityCats and other ferries in Brisbane, as it winds its way through the city centre.

== Events ==
The Brisbane River hosts numerous events including the Brisbane Festival, Riverfire, and the Brisbane River Classic fishing competition. Many schools and clubs use the river to conduct rowing regattas on Milton Reach. Sailing regattas are also held on this reach as well as the Hamilton reach.

=== Riverfire ===
Riverfire, which began in 1998, was a festival held in September each year at South Bank Parklands and surrounding areas (including the Victoria Bridge), to celebrate the Brisbane River. In 2009, the festival merged with Brisbane Festival. Riverfire was previously held at the end of the Brisbane Festival until 2022 when it was changed to be held as the festival opener. The event involves an afternoon RAAF aerial display utilising aircraft such as the F/A-18 Super Hornet preceding the main event, a fireworks display extending the length of the Brisbane River from South Bank Parklands to the Story Bridge.

The RAAF also perform a practice session in the days preceding the event, serving as an opportunity to both practice beforehand and also promote Riverfire. One of the most popular RAAF aircraft to perform at Riverfire was the F-111 which was known for performing a 'dump-and-burn' above the city. The final F-111 dump-and-burn of Riverfire occurred in 2010 was able to be seen as far as the Gold Coast and Toowoomba as the F-111 climbed from 300 ft (91 m) to a higher altitude of about 10,000 ft (3,000 m). The 20th Riverfire attracted nearly 500,000 people to the river.

In 2009 as part of the Q150 celebrations, Riverfire was announced as one of the Q150 Icons of Queensland for its role as an "Events and festivals".

== Named in its honour ==
The electoral district of Maiwar created in the 2017 Queensland state electoral redistribution was named after the river's indigenous name.

== See also ==
- Bridges over the Brisbane River
- Riverstage
- List of Brisbane ferry wharves
- List of rivers of Australia § Queensland
