= Albert Bridge, Brisbane =

Albert Bridge
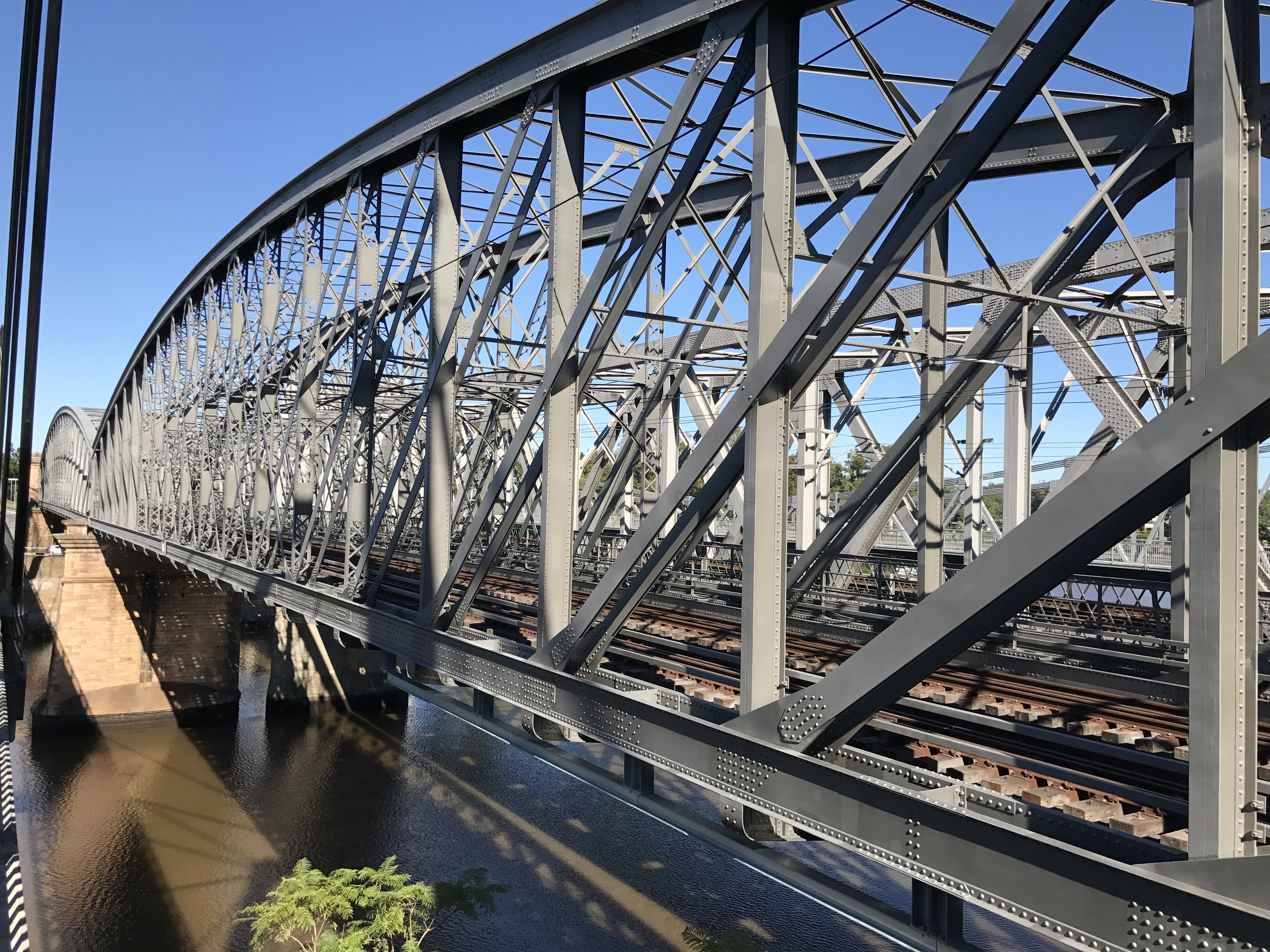
- Coordinates: 27.5056°S 152.9737°E
- Carries: Railway
- Crosses: Brisbane River
- Locale: Brisbane, Queensland, Australia
- Official name: Albert Bridge

Characteristics
- Design: Steel Truss bridge
- Total length: 208 metres (682 ft)
- Longest span: two spans each 103.7 metres (340 ft)

History
- Opened: 1895; 131 years ago

Location
- Interactive map of Albert Bridge

Albert Bridge, Brisbane
- Location within Queensland
- 27.5059°S 152.9739°E
- Location: Brisbane River between Indooroopilly and Chelmer, Indooroopilly, City of Brisbane, Queensland, Australia

History
- Design period: 1870s–1890s (late 19th century)
- Built: 1894–1895

Site notes
- Architect: Henry Charles Stanley

Queensland Heritage Register
- Official name: Albert Bridge
- Type: state heritage (built)
- Designated: 21 October 1992
- Reference no.: 600232
- Significant period: 1890s (fabric)
- Significant components: pier/s (bridge), abutments – railway bridge
- Builders: John McCormick & Son

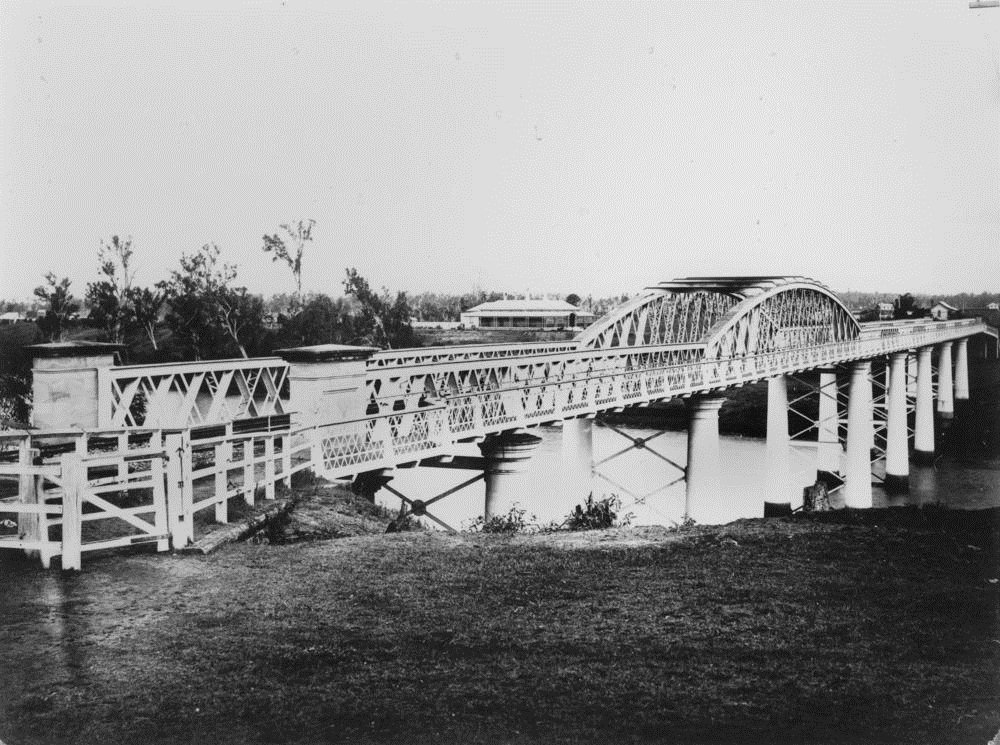
Original Albert Bridge, looking south to Chelmer

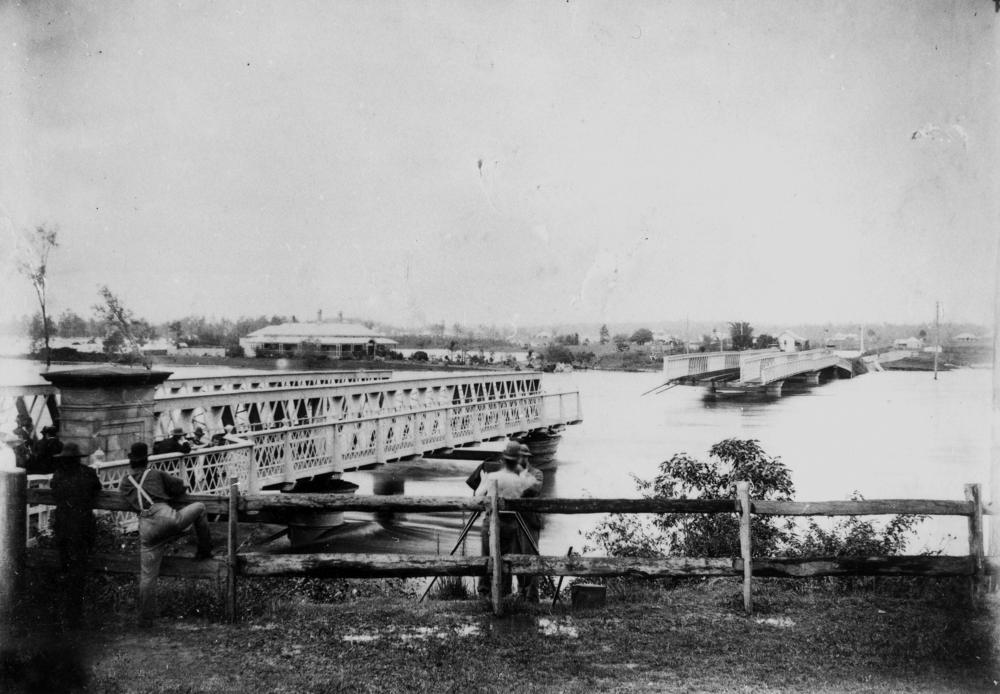
Original Albert Bridge (destroyed in the 1893 Brisbane flood)

Albert Bridge is a heritage-listed railway bridge of steel truss design crossing the Brisbane River between Indooroopilly and Chelmer in the City of Brisbane, Queensland, Australia. It was designed by Henry Charles Stanley and built between 1894 and 1895 by John McCormick & Son as a replacement for an earlier bridge lost to flooding in 1893. Both bridges were named in honour of the Prince of Wales, Prince Albert, who later ruled under the name Edward VII. It was added to the Queensland Heritage Register on 21 October 1992.

The Albert Bridge links Indooroopilly and Chelmer railway station. The structure consists of two steel spans supported by masonry abutments and a central concrete pier that is encased in an iron caisson. A footway was provided on the upstream side.

== History ==
The first Albert Bridge on the site was completed in June 1876 and enabled the Main Line railway from Grandchester to Ipswich to be extended to reach Brisbane itself. In the early days of settlement, the Brisbane River at Indooroopilly provided an obstacle to the construction of a railway between Brisbane and the mining centre of Ipswich. At this time, a river boat service linked the two centres. The completion of the first Albert Bridge enabled the Ipswich railway line to open in 1875. The bridge facilitated the mass transportation of goods between Ipswich and Brisbane, which previously was only possible through shipping. The first bridge was destroyed in the 1893 flood. In the meantime, ferries were used to transport people and goods across the busy river. This, however, led to the capsize of the ferry Pearl disaster in 1896 with the loss of more than 40 lives.

The second and current Albert Bridge was built in 1895. It was designed by Henry Charles Stanley, Queensland's Chief Engineer of Railways from 1891 to 1901 and is considered his major work. He designed a "hogsback" steel truss bridge on masonry piers. In designing the bridge as two long spans with one central pier, he tried to minimise the obstruction to flood waters created by multiple piers, which had been the downfall of the first bridge.

Innovations in the design included the attachment of cross girders, protection against derailment, provision against strong wind gusts, and provision for free expansion under varying temperatures. The working drawings and specification were prepared by FL Keir of the Chief Engineer's office, and were completed by mid-1893. Keir was also the resident engineer on the site.

In August 1893 the contract was let to Brisbane contractors John McCormick & Son, with a price of £66,061. McCormick & Son also later won the contract for the ironwork on the second permanent Victoria Bridge, 1896–97. Expiry date for the Albert Bridge contract was set at 14 December 1894, but it was not opened to traffic until August 1895. A Scottish coal strike held up delivery of the rolled steel for eight months, and removal of the river bedrock for the central pier alone took four months.

A condition of the construction contract was that as much of the work as possible be done in Queensland. Messrs McCormick erected a workshop adjacent to the site at Indooroopilly, and imported machinery necessary for constructing the superstructure and the caisson for the central pier. Up to 240 persons were employed on site at any one time, and quarry workers provided freestone from Pearson's quarries at Helidon, the bluestone in the concrete from Jenkin's Bundamba quarry, and the granite for the bedstones and cutwater quoins from Mount Crosby. In 1895 the bridge was the largest in Australia of local manufacture.

The most difficult aspect of the work was the construction of the central pier and its foundation caisson. The latter weighed about 230 long tons (230 t), rested 81 feet (25 m) below high water mark, and was sunk 2 feet (0.61 m) into the rock. The riverbed sand and gravel could be dredged, but divers extracted the rock manually.

The southern span was erected above what remained of the former bridge, and was extended to the centre pier. The old pylons were then removed.

The northern truss was floated into position. The shore end rested on two trolleys, and when the tide was at its highest, specially constructed staging on an old barque took the weight of the other end of the truss from temporary piles. Winches were then used to pull the hulk across the river toward the centre pier, to which the truss was attached.

The cores of the earlier bridge abutments were widened and heightened to take the new superstructure. Parapets were constructed after the trusses had been fixed in place, and were completed in November 1895.

When opened the bridge also catered for pedestrian traffic, until the construction of the nearby Walter Taylor Bridge in 1937.

The Albert Bridge remains one of Australia's largest truss bridges. At the time of its completion, as a metal truss bridge it was second only to the first Hawkesbury rail bridge (1889) in span length. The Albert Bridge is still Australia's third longest span metal truss bridge, after Brisbane's Story Bridge (1940) (Story Bridge) and the second Hawkesbury rail bridge (1945).

The bridge was integral to the southwest railway system linking Brisbane with Ipswich, the Darling Downs, and southeast Queensland. With increased traffic it was supplemented with an adjacent upstream rail bridge in 1957, which together remained the only Brisbane River rail crossing prior to construction of the Merivale Bridge in 1978.

The Albert Bridge currently handles only passenger traffic.

A second unnamed railway bridge is located between the Albert Bridge and the Walter Taylor Bridge. This second crossing was constructed in 1957 as part of the quadruplication of the Ipswich railway line.

== Description ==
The Albert Bridge spans the Brisbane River from Indooroopilly to Chelmer, at the junction of the Chelmer and Indooroopilly reaches.

It is a fully riveted structure consisting of two arched "hogsback" mild steel trusses supported on stone abutments either side, and on a central concrete pier. This pier is encased in an elliptical wrought- iron caisson to low water level, then built up with masonry to the truss bearings.

Each truss is 103.7 metres (340 ft) long, 12.6 metres (41 ft) high in the middle, 8.2 metres (27 ft) wide, and weighs approximately 606 metric tons (596 long tons; 668 short tons). Their design employs a double-intersection web system of diagonal members, based on the Linville system developed in the United States in the 1860s. They are strengthened by horizontal wind bracing at roadway level, and by elaborate overhead cross bracing.

The double railroad is carried by four longitudinal steel trough girders, with the sides of the troughs acting as guards against derailment. These are supported by massive cross-girders riveted to the underneath of the vertical struts and lower booms of the main trusses, at 5.2 metres (17 ft) intervals. The decking consists of ironbark longitudinals bedded on bitumen and sand, and bolted to steel tee bars which connect the trough girders transversely.

A cantilevered wrought iron footway is carried on the upstream side of the bridge.

== Heritage listing ==
The Albert Bridge was registered on the (now defunct) Register of the National Estate in 1988. It was listed on the Queensland Heritage Register on 21 October 1992 having satisfied the following criteria.

The place is important in demonstrating the evolution or pattern of Queensland's history.

Albert Bridge at Indooroopilly is significant as an early, large span metal truss bridge in Australia, and remains the country's third longest span metal truss bridge. At the time of construction, Albert Bridge was the largest bridge in Australia to be manufactured locally. Albert Bridge is significant for its contribution to the railway system linking the capital with southern and western Queensland, remaining for over six decades part of the only railway link across the Brisbane River.

The place is important in demonstrating the principal characteristics of a particular class of cultural places.

The bridge is highly intact, and provides important physical evidence of late 19th century railway bridge design and construction in Australia.

The place is important because of its aesthetic significance.

The bridge is important also for its landmark quality and aesthetic contribution to the riverscape along the Indooroopilly reach of the Brisbane River.

The place is important in demonstrating a high degree of creative or technical achievement at a particular period.

It is important for its innovations in design and implementation, and remains a major example of the design skills of engineer HC Stanley, and of the work of Brisbane contractors John McCormick & Son.

The place has a special association with the life or work of a particular person, group or organisation of importance in Queensland's history.

It is important for its innovations in design and implementation, and remains a major example of the design skills of engineer HC Stanley, and of the work of Brisbane contractors John McCormick & Son.

== See also ==
- Bridges over the Brisbane River
