= Indooroopilly Railway Bridge =

Indooroopilly Railway
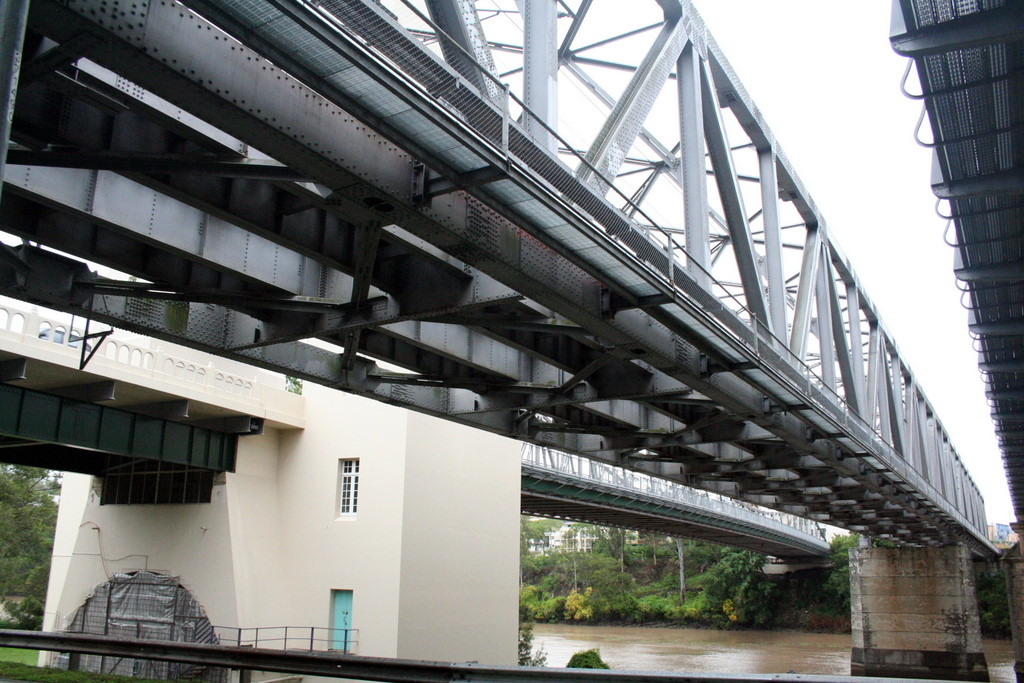
- Coordinates: 27.506026°S 152.973981°E
- Carries: Railway
- Crosses: Brisbane River
- Locale: Brisbane, Queensland, Australia
- Official name: Indooroopilly Railway Bridge

Characteristics
- Design: Truss bridge
- Total length: 208.5 metres (684 ft)

History
- Opened: 1957; 68 years ago

The Indooroopilly Railway Bridge is a railway bridge of steel truss design which crosses the Brisbane River, Queensland, Australia. The Indooroopilly Railway Bridge links Indooroopilly and Chelmer stations, and has two long spans with one central pier. It was built just upstream and parallel to the Albert Bridge as part of the quadruplication of the Ipswich Line between 1955 and 1957.

== History ==
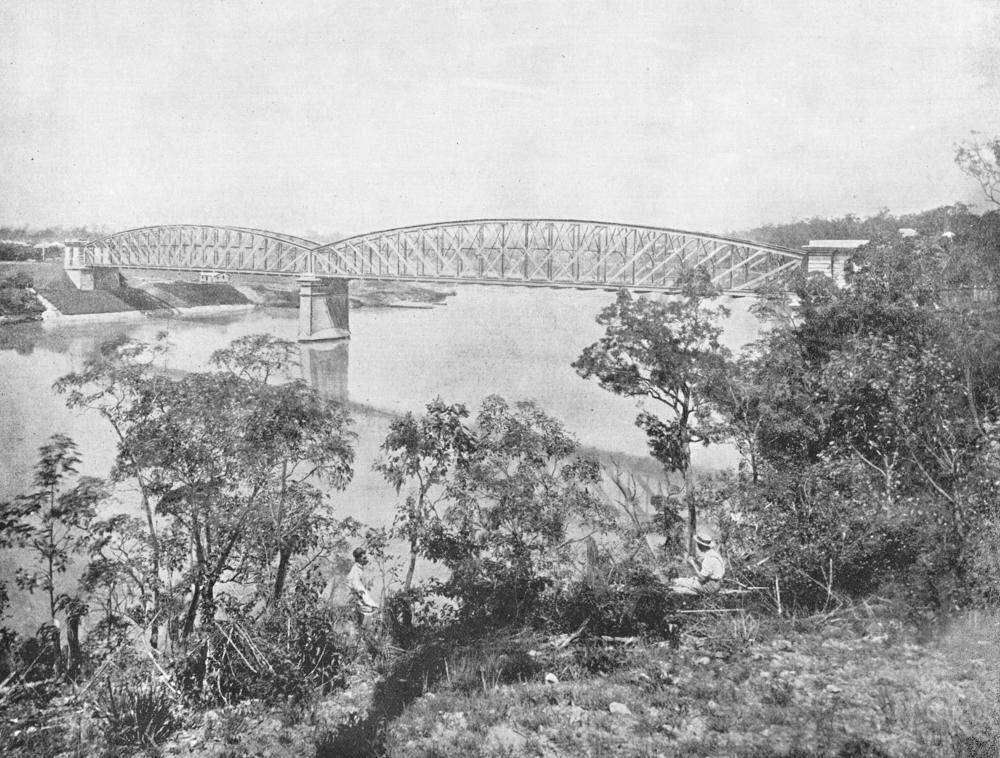
Albert Bridge the first railway bridge at Indooroopilly.

The present bridge is 208.5 metres long with two equal spans. The Coordinator-General's Department designed the bridge and the Electric Power Transmission Pty Coy was the construction contractor. The superstructure was designed as a parallel chord truss bridge, fabricated in Italy by the Societa Anonima Elettrificazione S.P.A.

In 2024–2025, the bridge is being refurbished. The work will include cleaning, sandblasting and repainting the bridge structure. Bridge transoms will be replaced. To facilitate future maintenance, a walkway and handrails will be added.

== See also ==
- Bridges over the Brisbane River
