= List of bridges in Brisbane =

This is a list of major bridges in Brisbane, Queensland, Australia:

- Airport Flyover, Brisbane
- Albert Bridge, Brisbane
- Breakfast Creek Green Bridge
- Captain Cook Bridge, Brisbane
- Centenary Bridge
- Charlie Earp Bridge
- Eleanor Schonell Bridge
- Go Between Bridge
- Goodwill Bridge
- Hornibrook Bridge
- Houghton Highway
- Indooroopilly Railway Bridge
- Jack Pesch Bridge
- Kangaroo Point Green Bridge
- Kurilpa Bridge
- Merivale Bridge
- Neville Bonner Bridge
- Sir Leo Hielscher Bridges
- Story Bridge
- Ted Smout Memorial Bridge
- Victoria Bridge, Brisbane
- Walter Taylor Bridge
- William Jolly Bridge

== See also ==
- Bridges over the Brisbane River
- Historic bridges of New South Wales
- List of bridges in Sydney
- List of bridges in Melbourne
- List of bridges in Perth, Western Australia
- List of bridges in Hobart
- List of crossings of the Murray River
- Crossings of the Yarra River
