= Brisbane suburbs with Aboriginal names =

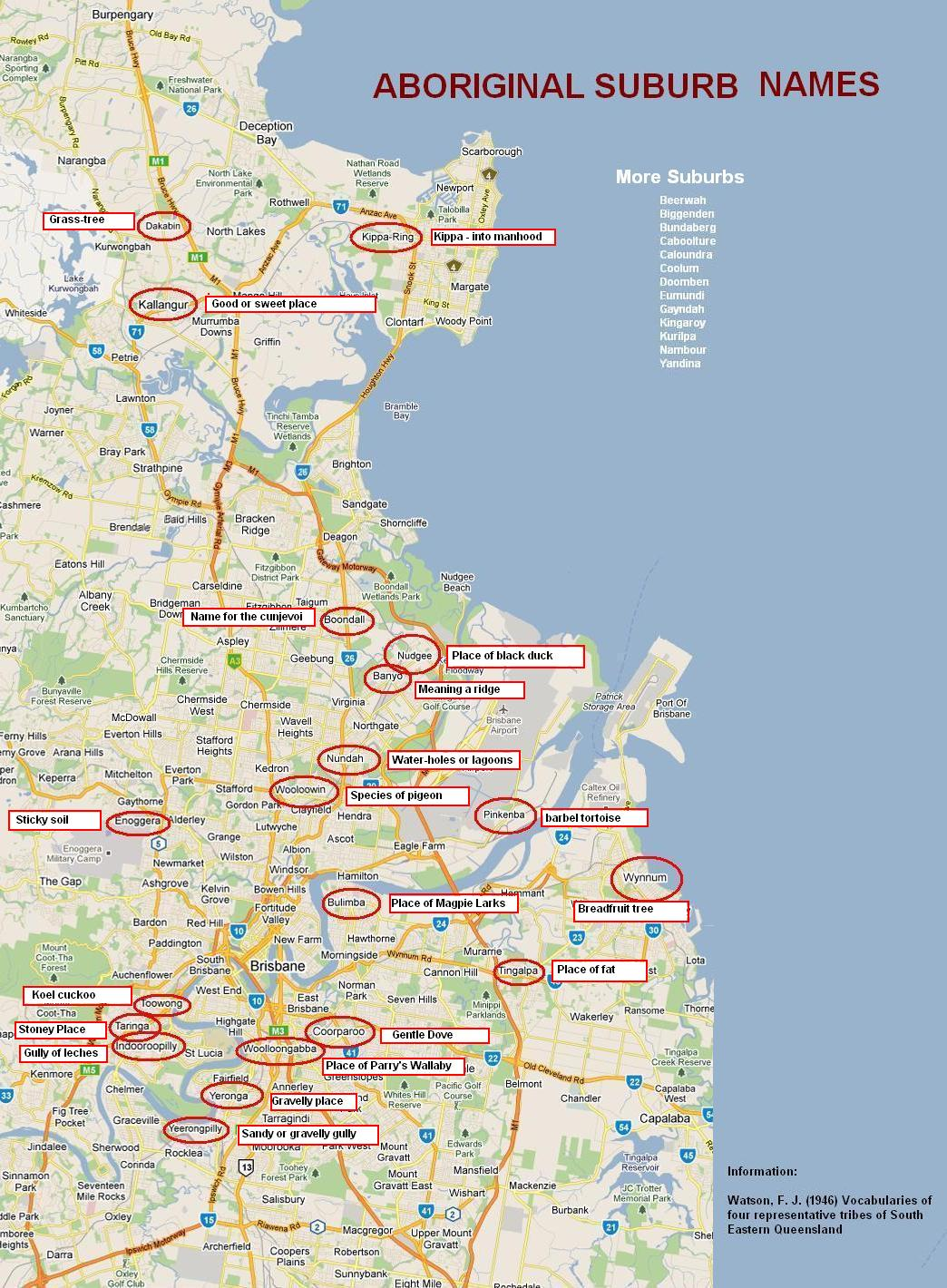
Aboriginal names associated with Brisbane suburbs

Brisbane suburb names with Aboriginal names show that some Australian Aboriginal languages are still preserved today, in the form of placenames. Similarly, F. J. Watson explains the meanings of Queensland suburb names.

The map demonstrates a non-exhaustive list of some of the names in the Brisbane area. Information on some suburbs has been shortened to fit onto the map. Not included examples are Murarrie, Moorooka, Tarragindi, Darra, Corinda and Jindalee.

Euoggera (YI) –Incorrectly spelled by an error made at the Government Lands Office, when the letter u was mistaken for n. It was intended that the name should be recorded as Euoggera. The name is a corruption of Yau’ar-nga’ri, meaning literally, sing-play, or song and dance, referring to a corroboree ground. It is said to have first applied to a site near the mouth of Breakfast Creek. It is possible, however, that the name was independently applied to a site at the place at presently known as Enoggera.

There are many misconceptions about Indigenous languages, such as that there is only one indigenous language of all Australians; that the name of a group/ tribe has only one spelling; or that finding an indigenous word is easy.

There may have been between 200 and 250 languages spoken in Australia 200 years ago. Of this number more than half are extinct and many of the rest are under threat.

== See also ==
- List of Brisbane suburbs

== Bibliography ==
- Bell, J. (1994). Dictionary of the Gubbi-Gubbi and Butchulla language. Spring Hill: Aboriginal University of Australia.
- Blake, B.J. (1991). "Australian Aboriginal Languages: A general introduction". St Lucia: University of Queensland Press.
- Sharpe, M.C. (1999). An introduction to the Yugambeh-Bundjalung language and its dialects. Canberra: Pacific Linguistics.
- Sharpe, M.C. (1999). Dictionary of Western Bundjalung including Gidhabal and Tabulam Bundjalung. Canberra: Pacific Linguistics.
- Watson, F.J. (1944). Vocabularies of four representative tribes of South Eastern Queensland. Brisbane: Royal Geographical Society of Australasia.
