= Breakfast Creek Green Bridge =

Pedestrian bridge in Brisbane, Queensland, Australia

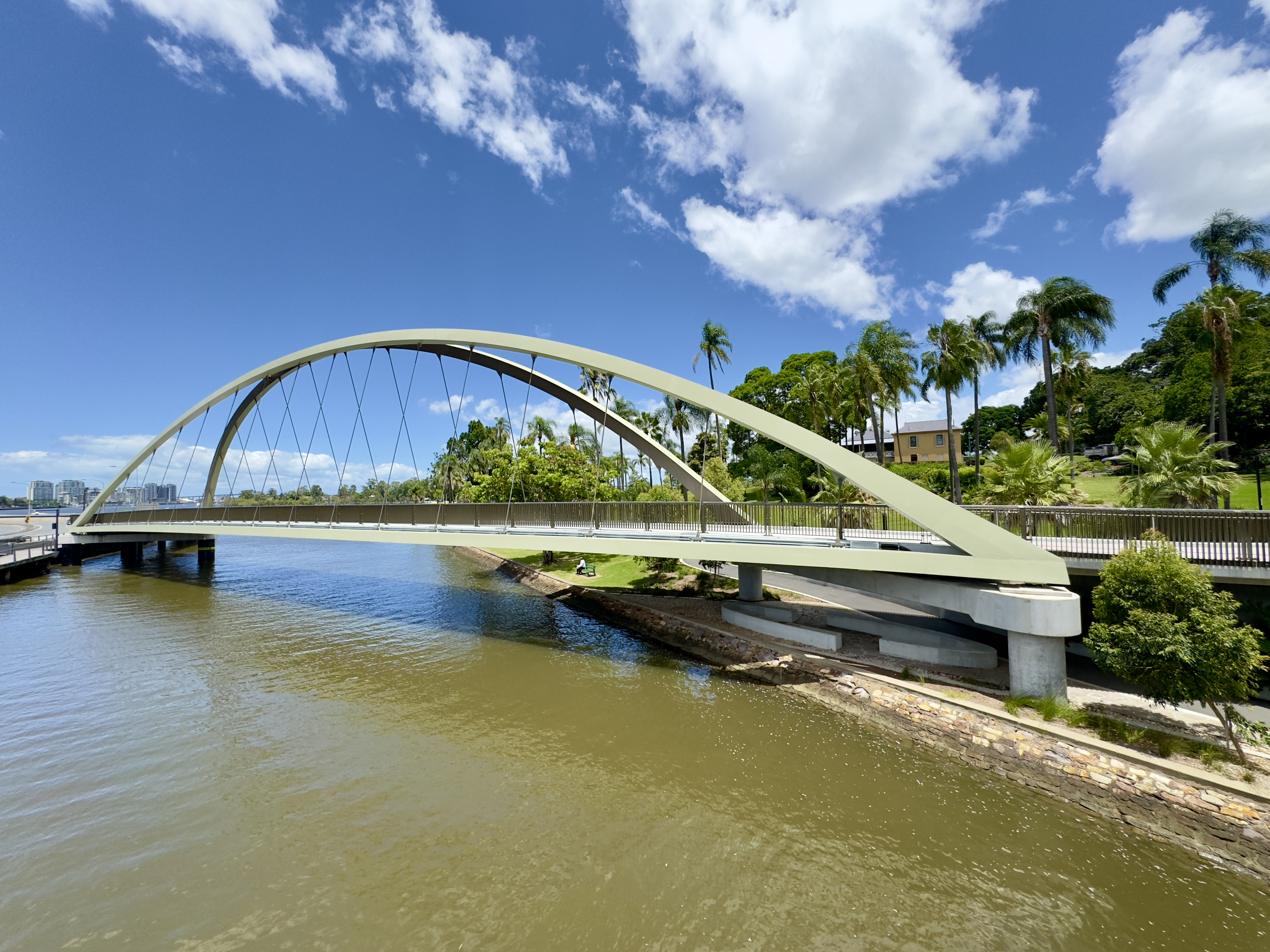
- Bridge in 2025
- Carries: Pedestrians and cyclists
- Crosses: Breakfast Creek
- Locale: Brisbane, Queensland, Australia

Characteristics
- Design: Steel tied-arch bridge
- Total length: 67 metres (220 ft) and 89 metres (292 ft)

History
- Opened: February 2024

The Breakfast Creek Green Bridge is a pedestrian and cycle bridge over Breakfast Creek in Brisbane, Queensland, Australia. The bridge connects Newstead Park at Newstead to the Lores Bonney Riverwalk in Albion in the inner north east of the city. The bridge design is a tied arch bridge with two different arch spans 67 metres and 89 metres inclined and supported together.

Construction was being undertaken by Georgiou Group. and the project's cost was $67 million. The bridge was completed in early 2024 and opened on 10 February 2024.

== See also ==
- Bridges over the Brisbane River
- List of bridges in Brisbane
