= Neville Bonner Bridge =

Footbridge spanning the Brisbane River in Brisbane, Australia

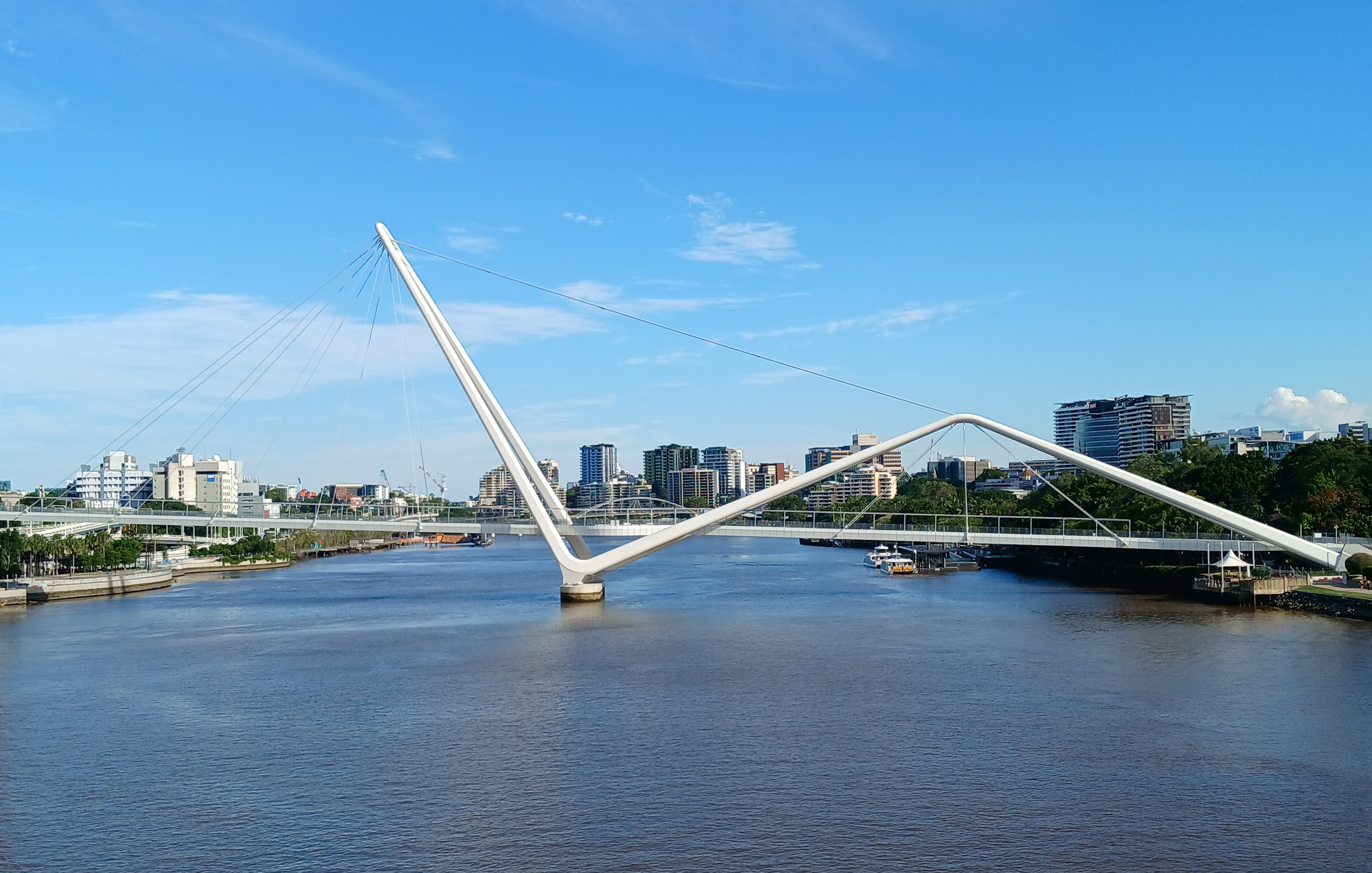
- Bridge in 2024
- Coordinates: 27.4746°S 153.0224°E
- Carries: Pedestrians
- Crosses: Brisbane River
- Locale: Brisbane, Queensland, Australia
- Other name: Queen’s Wharf Bridge
- Named for: Neville Bonner
- Owner: Queensland Government

Characteristics
- Design: Cable-stayed bridge
- Material: Steel
- Total length: 320 metres (1,050 ft)
- Height: Mast: 75 metres (246 ft)
- Longest span: 145 metres (476 ft)
- No. of spans: 2
- Piers in water: 1
- Clearance below: 11.4 metres (37 ft) - 12.7 metres (42 ft) from high water level to the bridge deck

History
- Engineering design by: Grimshaw Architects; WSP
- Constructed by: Fitzgerald Constructions Australia
- Construction start: March 2020
- Opened: 28 August 2024

Location
- Interactive map of Neville Bonner Bridge

The Neville Bonner Bridge is a pedestrian bridge spanning the Brisbane River in Brisbane, Australia, connecting the Queen's Wharf precinct in the Brisbane central business district to the South Bank Parklands in South Brisbane. The bridge opened to the public on 28 August 2024.

It is named in honour of Neville Bonner, a Queensland politician and the first Indigenous member of the Parliament of Australia.

The design concept for the bridge, by Grimshaw Architects, is an arch and single mast cable-stayed bridge with continuous shading supported by a mid-river pier. A large observation deck is located in the centre of the bridge.

Up to 10,000 people are expected to use the bridge every day. Cyclists will not be permitted to use the bridge. The cost of the bridge's construction was estimated in 2019 to be around $100 million. This cost was paid by the Destination Brisbane Consortium, with ownership subsequently transferred to the Queensland Government upon its completion. Prior to the official opening in 2024, a preview event for approximately 500 pedestrians was held on 2 September 2023.

== History ==
The bridge is part of the Queen's Wharf development in the Brisbane central business district. Construction on the bridge had begun by March 2020. During construction in June 2021, the Riverside Expressway was partially closed so that pieces of the bridge could be placed above the road. Close to the banks piles were dug 30 metres into the ground to support the structure, while in the river a depth of 35 metres was reached. The final 10-metre, 20-tonne span was placed on the morning of 27 February 2023.

== Design ==
The bridge was designed by Neil Stonell from Grimshaw Architects. The “lightweight yet dramatic” design incorporates 1,000 tonnes of fabricated structural steel, engineered to create an “elegant and efficient outcome”. The cable-stayed bridge is 320 metres (1,050 feet) long. The maximum mast height is 75 metres (246 feet). The clearance for river vessels is 11.4 to 12.7 metres (37 to 42 feet) from high water level to the bridge deck. This is the same height as the Victoria and Captain Cook Bridges. The bridge is fully shaded.

It features two arches, each 60 metres long and weighing 90 tonnes. The walkway is suspended from the arches which reach a height of 30 metres above the river. The majority of the load is placed on the central pier. A piled abutment foundation at Southbank is used to tie back the arches. The bridge has been designed to withstand wind speeds greater than 220 km per hour and to resist a 1 in 2000-year flood event.

== See also ==
- Bridges over the Brisbane River
- List of bridges in Brisbane
