= Captain Cook Bridge =

Captain Cook Bridge may refer to:

- Captain Cook Bridge, Brisbane
- Captain Cook Bridge, Sydney
