= Bridges over the Brisbane River =

Bridges in Australia

The Brisbane River, running through Brisbane, Queensland, Australia, is crossed by seventeen major bridges, from the Sir Leo Hielscher Bridges downstream to the Centenary upstream. The river meanders through an urban area that comprises 2,562,000 people.

There are two smaller crossings in the west of Brisbane City in the suburb of Mount Crosby: the Mount Crosby Weir, and Colleges Crossing (which straddles the boundary between Brisbane and Ipswich).

== Planning ==
A bridge downstream of the Victoria Bridge was part of a larger plan, devised by Professor Roger Hawken of the University of Queensland in the 1920s, for a series of bridges over the Brisbane River to alleviate congestion on Victoria Bridge and to divert traffic away from the Brisbane central business district. The William Jolly Bridge was the first of the Hawken Plan bridges to be constructed. Lack of funds precluded the construction of the downstream bridge at that time. Initially plans called for a transporter bridge further downstream near New Farm.

In 1926 Kangaroo Point was recommended by the Brisbane City Council's Cross River Commission. Subsequently the bridge was constructed as a public works program during the Great Depression. The cost was to be no more than £1.6 million.

== Major bridges ==
#	Name	Usage	Description	Suburbs	Photo
1	Sir Leo Hielscher (two bridges) — original bridge formerly known as the Gateway Bridge	vehicles, cyclists & pedestrians	Original bridge opened January 1986 by the Duke of Edinburgh; Duplicate bridge opened May 2010. Concrete box girder design. 260 metre (853 ft) main span.	Eagle Farm (north) to Murarrie (south)	
2	Story	vehicles & pedestrians	Opened July 1940. Steel truss design. 777 metres (2,549 ft) long with a 282-metre (925 ft) main span.	Fortitude Valley (north) to Kangaroo Point (south)	
3	Kangaroo Point	pedestrians & cyclists	Opened December 2024. Steel cable stayed design. 470 metres (1,509 ft) long with a 183-metre (600 ft) main span.	Brisbane City (west) to Kangaroo Point (east)	
4	Captain Cook	vehicles	Opened 1972. Concrete box girder design. 555 metres (1,821 ft) long with 183 metre (600 ft) main span.	Brisbane City (north) to Kangaroo Point (south)	
5	Goodwill	pedestrians & cyclists	Opened October 2001. 450 metres (1,476 ft) long with 102 metre (335 ft) main span.	Brisbane City (north) to South Brisbane (south)	
6	Neville Bonner	pedestrians only	Opened August 2024. Cable-stayed design. 320 metres (1,050 ft) long with a 77-metre (253 ft) main span.	Brisbane City (north) to South Brisbane (south)	
7	Victoria	buses, cyclists & pedestrians	Opened 1969. Replaced its namesake. 146.3 metre (480 ft) main span.	Brisbane City (north) to South Brisbane (south)	
8	Kurilpa	pedestrians & cyclists	Opened October 2009. 'Tensegrity' design. 425m long pathway	Brisbane City (north) to South Brisbane (south)	
9	William Jolly — also known as Grey Street Bridge	vehicles & pedestrians	Opened March 1932. Steel frame arch design with concrete veneer. 498 metres (1,634 ft) long with a 73-metre (240 ft) main span.	Brisbane City (north) to South Brisbane (south)	
10	Merivale	rail	Opened November 1978. Tied steel arch design. Main span 132 metre (433 ft).	Brisbane City (north) to South Brisbane (south)	
11	Go Between — formerly known as Hale Street Link	vehicles, cyclists & pedestrians	Opened 5 July 2010. Concrete box girder balanced cantilever design.	Brisbane City (north) to South Brisbane (south)	
12	Eleanor Schonell — formerly known as Green Bridge	buses, cyclists & pedestrians	Opened December 2006. Cable-stayed design. 390 metres (1,280 ft) long.	St Lucia (north) to Dutton Park (south)	
13	Jack Pesch	cyclists & pedestrians	Opened October 1998. Steel cable-stay design.	Indooroopilly (north) to Chelmer (south)	
14	Albert	rail	Opened 1895. Steel truss design. Replaced its namesake. 208 metres (682 ft) long with two spans each 103.7 metres (340 ft).	Indooroopilly (north) to Chelmer (south)	
15	Indooroopilly Railway	rail	Opened 1957. Steel truss design. 208.5 metres (684 ft) long with two equal spans.	Indooroopilly (north) to Chelmer (south)	
16	Walter Taylor	vehicles & pedestrians	Opened February 1936. Suspension design. Main span 183 metres (600 ft). The bridge's towers are occupied.	Indooroopilly (north) to Chelmer (south)	
17	Centenary	vehicles, cyclists & pedestrians	Original bridge opened in 1964. Duplicate bridge opened in 1986. Concrete girder	Kenmore, Fig Tree Pocket (north) to Jindalee (south)	

== Map ==
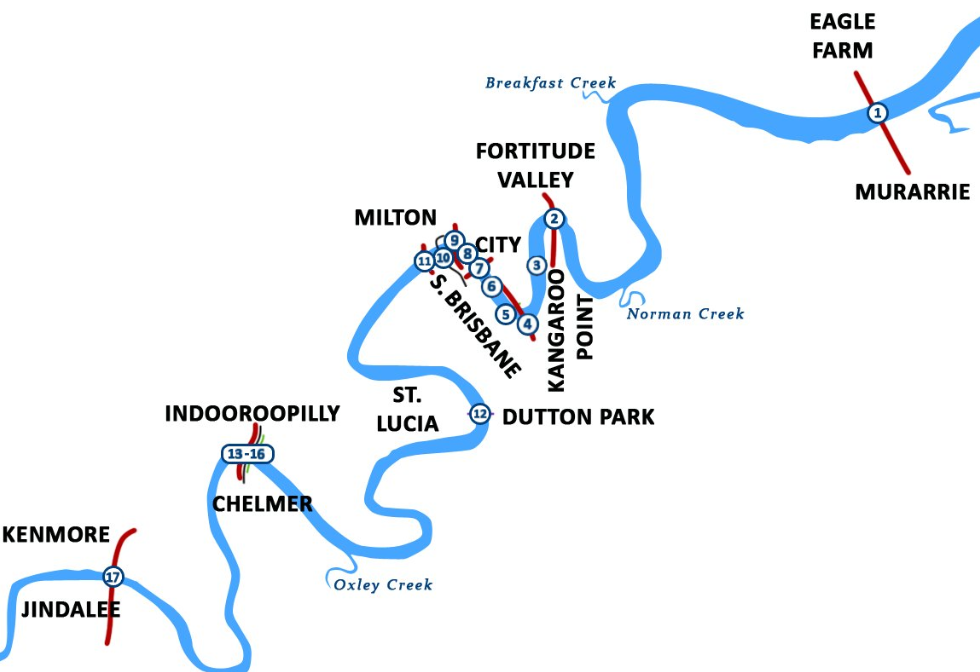
Map of Bridges across the Brisbane River Legend Brisbane River and Moreton Bay Road bridges Rail bridges Pedestrian only bridges Bus and pedestrian only bridges

== Future bridges ==
In 2007 the Smart State Council announced plans for a series of new green mode bridges for Brisbane. New bridges include;

- a connection from Alice Street near the Port Office Hotel in the City to Thornton Street, Kangaroo Point, which has now been built and opened as the Kangaroo Point Bridge.
- from Cairns Street, Kangaroo Point a new bridge will connect to the end of the floating riverwalk at Merthyr Road, New Farm.
- and from Merthyr Road, Teneriffe a new bridge will connect to Hardcaste Park, Hawthorne (near Lindsay Street).

These new bridges will create a greenway corridor over 5 green bridges from Morningside, through Hawthorne, Teneriffe, New Farm, Kangaroo Point, City, Northbank, South Bank, Dutton Park and Boggo Road to the University of Queensland.

== Crossings between the Centenary Bridge and Wivenhoe Dam ==
In addition to the existing bridges between Centenary Bridge and Wivenhoe Dam, a number of others have been proposed.

The Goodna Bypass is proposed to relieve congestion on the Ipswich Motorway and will have four new bridges over the river (but no access to or from the north-western suburbs). Land acquisitions were underway in 2010 to create the future transport corridor. As of 2021, there is no date or funding provided to commence construction of the Goodna Bypass.

The Western Bypass would have included a crossing of the river but has been cancelled.

The existing crossings on this section of the river are listed below (note: coordinates are derived from Google Earth).

Name of crossing and/or road	Coordinates	Description and/or purpose	Photo
Moggill Ferry	27°35′41″S 152°51′22″E	Moggill (north) to Riverview (south)	Moggill ferry, 2008
Mount Crosby Road at Colleges Crossing	27°33′25″S 152°48′15″E	Mount Crosby (north) to Chuwar (south)	College's Crossing, 2012
Allawah Road across Mount Crosby Weir (Explorers Bridge)	27.4870°S 153.0167°E	Mount Crosby (north) to Chuwar (south)	Bridge at the Mount Crosby Pumping Station, circa 1950
Kholo Bridge, Kholo Road	27°33′54.10″S 152°44′51.61″E	Kholo (north) to Muirlea, Chuwar (south)	Pipeline being laid beside the Kholo Bridge, 1922
McMullen Road (ford, no longer used)	27.4946°S 152.7300°E	Lake Manchester (north) to Pine Mountain (south)	
Summervilles Road (Burtons Bridge)	27.49944°S 152.68944°E	Borallon (north) to Wanora, Borallon (south)—Borallon is a locality on both sides of the Brisbane River	Summerville Road East crossing, 2014
Banks Creek Road (Savages Crossing)	27°26′37″S 152°40′13″E	Savages Crossing was formerly a ford. From Banks Creek (north) to Fernvale (south).	Savages Crossing, 2014
Brisbane Valley Highway (Geoff Fisher Bridge)	27°25′51″S 152°38′22″E	Wivenhoe Pocket (north) to Fernvale (south), taking the highway across the river	Brisbane Valley Highway crossing, 2014
Wivenhoe Pocket Road (Twin Bridges)	27°26′13″S 152°38′00″E	Wivenhoe Pocket (north) to Fernvale (south), crossing the river via an island (involving two "twin" bridges)	Wivenhoe Pocket Road crossing, 2014
Brisbane Valley Highway across Wivenhoe Dam	27°23′40″S 152°36′33″E	The highway runs on top of the dam wall for 2.3 kilometres from Lake Wivenhoe (the locality) from north to south (Lake Wivenhoe being on both sides of the river)	Dam wall and main gates

== Crossings from Lake Wivenhoe to Moore ==
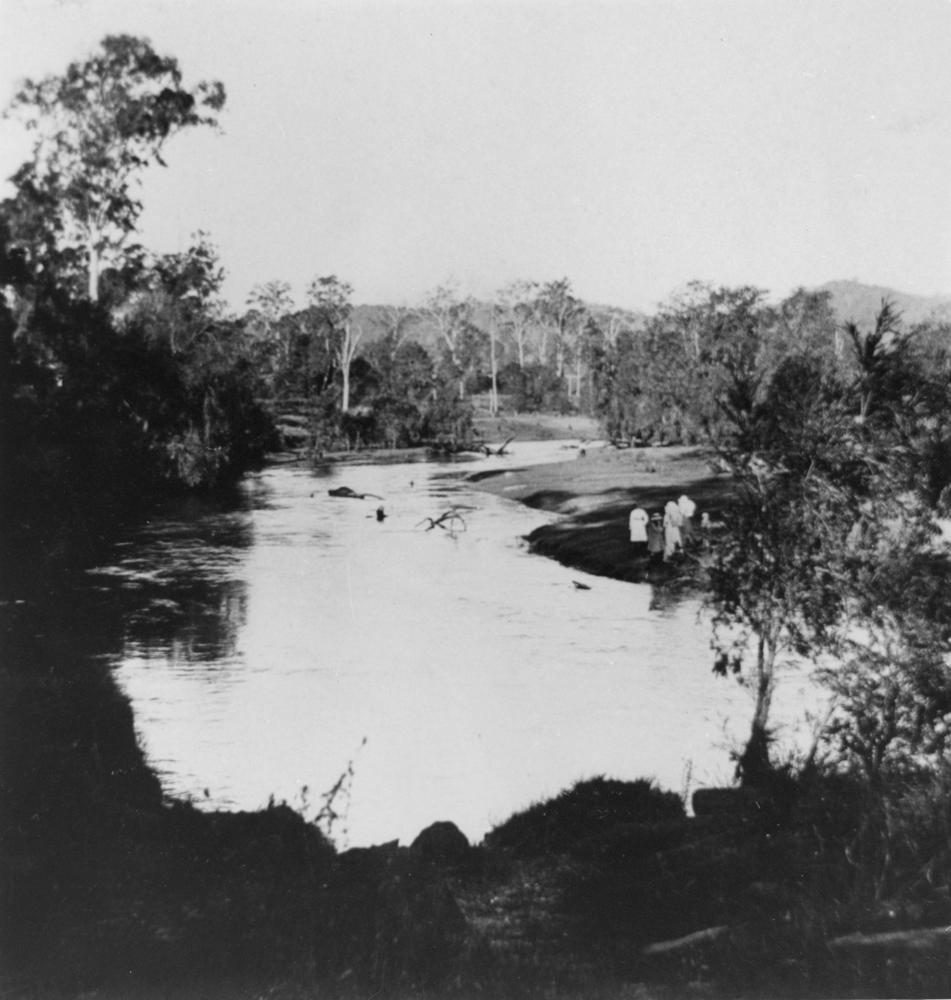
Along the Brisbane River near Wivenhoe Bridge, 1917

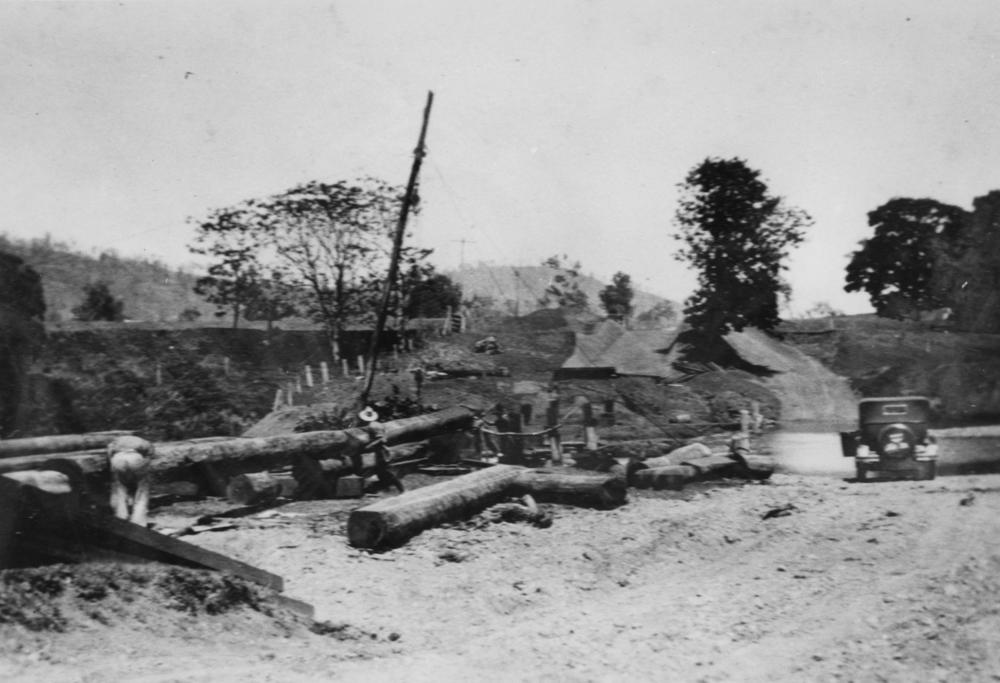
Construction of a bridge over the Brisbane River at Allery's Crossing (Arababy Creek Road), Moore, 1931

When Lake Wivenhoe is full the waters extend many kilometres up the river. The first crossing upstream from the lake is a high level bridge built in conjunction with the dam to raise the Esk Kilcoy Road well above the maximum level of the lake. Several minor crossings of this section of the river shown on maps are omitted from the list below. The omitted crossings belong to one of the following groups:

- Former low level crossings now covered (most of the time) by the waters of Lake Wivenhoe.
- Public or private roads that provide access to farms on the eastern side of the river.
- Private roads or tracks that link parts of farms that are astride the river.

The more significant crossings from Lake Wivenhoe to Moore are listed below.

Name of crossing and/or road	Coordinates	Description and/or purpose	Photo
Esk Kilcoy Road	27°08′18″S 152°30′36″E	Lake Wivenhoe (the locality) near Somerset Dam (the locality) (northside) to Lake Winhoe (the locality) near Caboonbah (southside), connects Kilcoy to Esk	
Gregors Creek Road	26°59′14″S 152°23′54″E	Gregors Creek (near Woolmar) northside to Gregors Creek (near Yimbun) southside, Links Brisbane Valley Highway to farms and provides an alternate route to Kilcoy	
D'Aguilar Highway	26°56′39″S 152°21′33″E	Harlin (near Woolmar) northside to Harlin (near Colinton) southside, links Brisbane Valley Highway to Kilcoy	

== Upstream from Moore ==
Linville Road follows the river from Moore through Linville to the Mount Stanley State Forest. It crosses the river 12 times between Linville and its end, where it splits into Western Branch Road and Eastern Branch Road. Western Branch Road follows the west branch of the river to its source in Elgin Vale State Forest, north-west of Mount Stanley, crossing it 28 times. Eastern Branch Road follows the east branch most of the way to its source south-east of Mount Stanley, crossing it about 20 times before it ends.

== See also ==
- List of bridges in Brisbane

For information about tunnels which cross the Brisbane River, please check the Brisbane River page.
