= Charlie Earp Bridge =

Road bridge in Brisbane, Queensland, Australia

- Coordinates: 27°24′48″S 153°05′02″E
- Carries: Motor vehicles, Pedestrians and cyclists
- Crosses: Airport Drive
- Locale: Brisbane, Queensland, Australia

Characteristics
- Material: Reinforced concrete

History
- Opened: 2005; 20 years ago

Location
- Interactive map of Charlie Earp Bridge

The Charlie Earp Bridge is a road bridge over the Airport Drive in Brisbane, Queensland, Australia.

The bridge, constructed over the main access road to the Brisbane Airport, is less than 1 kilometre (0.62 mi) from the Gateway Motorway and the Airport Flyover. It provides access to the Airport Village and the shopping centre with its anchor tenant, DFO Brisbane.
