= Kangaroo Point Green Bridge =

Pedestrian bridge in Brisbane, Australia

Kangaroo Point Bridge
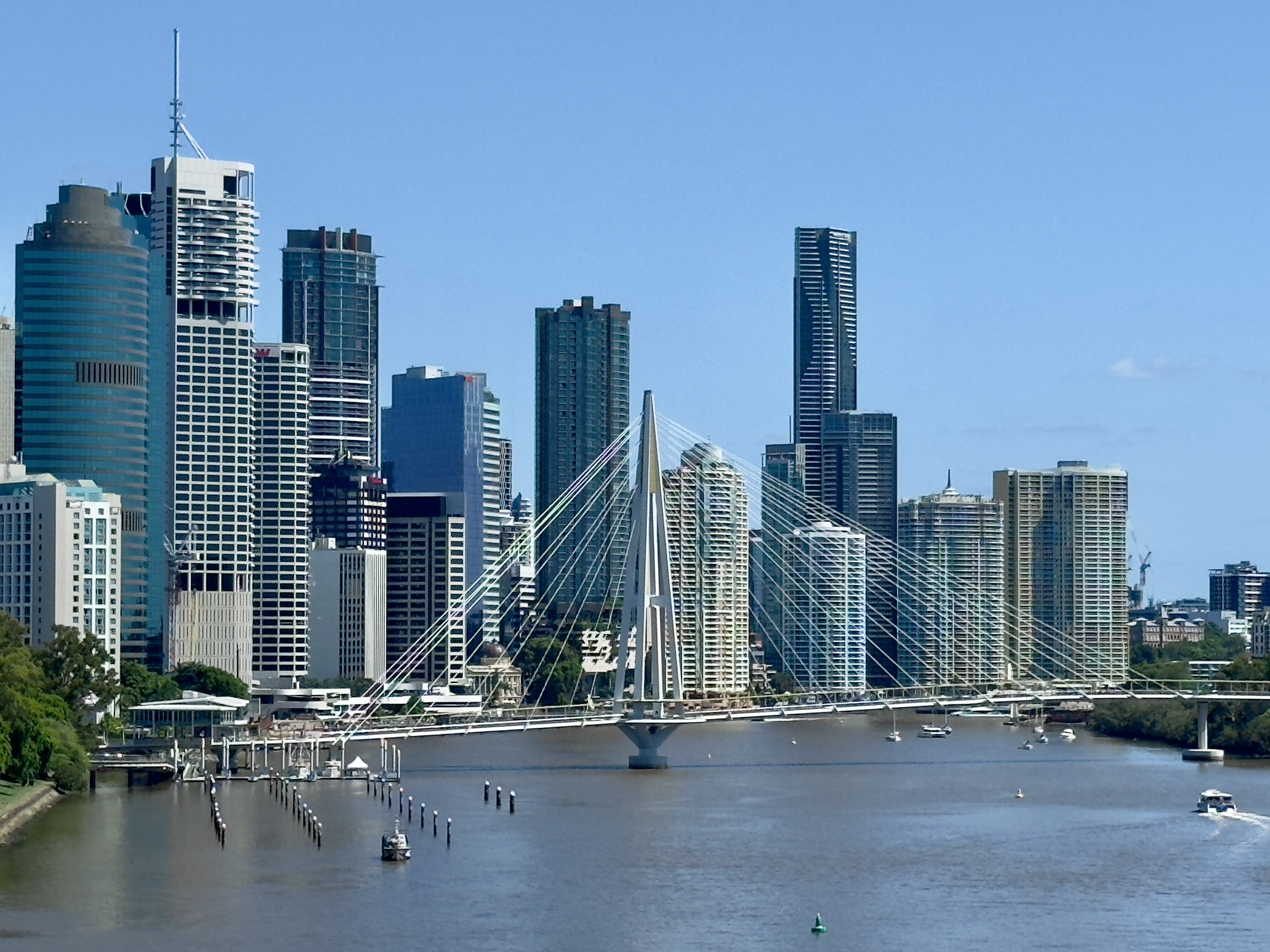
- Bridge completed in December 2024
- Carries: Pedestrians and cyclists
- Crosses: Brisbane River
- Locale: Brisbane, Queensland, Australia
- Other name: Alice Street Bridge

Characteristics
- Design: Steel cable stayed bridge
- Total length: 470 metres (1,540 ft)
- Width: 6.8 metres (22 ft)
- Clearance below: 11.4 metres (37 ft)-12.7 metres (42 ft) from high water level to the bridge deck

History
- Architect: Blight Rayner Architecture with Dissing+Weitling
- Engineering design by: WSP
- Constructed by: Besix Watpac
- Opened: 15 December 2024

The Kangaroo Point Bridge is a pedestrian and cyclist bridge spanning the Brisbane River in Brisbane, Australia. The bridge connects the Brisbane central business district with the suburb of Kangaroo Point.

The design for the bridge is a single-mast cable stayed structure which connects the Alice Street–Edward Street intersection in the city with Scott Street in Kangaroo Point, north from the Thornton Street ferry wharf. Construction of the bridge began in 2021, and it opened to foot traffic and cyclists on 15 December 2024.

== Design ==
The reference design for the bridge was completed by Cox Architecture and Arup. The single-mast cable stayed structure has a length of 470 metres (1,540 feet) with a width of 6.8 metres (22 feet) reaching a height of 11.4 to 12.7 metres (37 to 42 feet) from high water level to the bridge deck, which is the same height as Victoria and Captain Cook bridges. The final design and documentation was developed by Blight Rayner Architecture and Dissing + Weitling as part of Connect Brisbane consortium with Besix Watpac as managing contractor. The redesign includes the optimisation of the four-pronged mast by introducing a cruciform mast tie, refining the original sketch and making it more structurally efficient. The redesign of the Kangaroo Point pier, opens up to C. T. White Park and employs a curated selection of angular geometries to create a cohesive design. The new design also incorporated the addition of a boutique restaurant over the river and a cafe at the city end.

== History ==
The bridge construction was included in the Brisbane City Master Plan 2014 as a priority project. It was expected that the construction of the bridge would be completed within five years. On 31 October 2016, council commenced geotechnical investigative works.

In August 2018, the state government offered funding to the city council to develop a business case. In November 2020, the Brisbane City Council released Draft Reference Design Consultation Report for the bridge. A preliminary business case for the project was expected in late 2021.

Construction was awarded in 2021 to Besix Watpac. Construction of the bridge began in 2021 and was expected to be completed in 2023. 30 boat moorings on the Brisbane River were removed for the bridge's construction. The bridge's construction cost was initially expected to be $190 million. In September 2023, it was announced the bridge would cost $299 million. The bridge was officially opened on 15 December 2024.

A cafe on the city side of the bridge called Mulga Bill's Kitchen & Bar opened on 14 February 2025. A 100-seat restaurant called Stilts with over the river dining is located on the city end of the bridge.

== Integration and connectivity ==
The Kangaroo Point Green Bridge significantly enhances bike path connectivity between the Brisbane central business district and Kangaroo Point, facilitating easier movement between the city and eastern suburbs.

== Project features ==
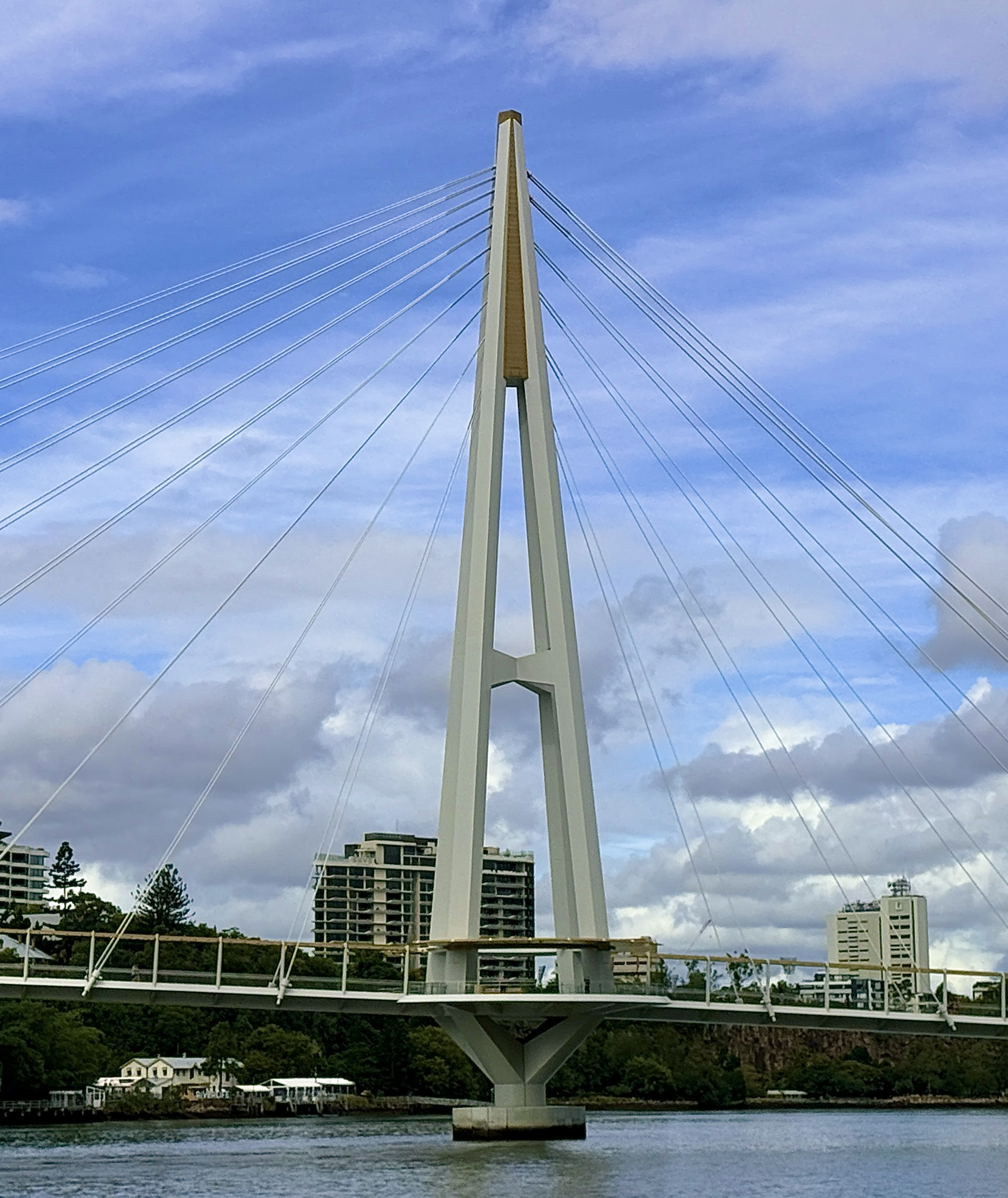
Mast of the Kangaroo Point Bridge in Brisbane, Queensland.

The bridge spans approximately 460 metres with an elegant single-mast cable-stayed design, minimising visual impact while complementing the city skyline. It features dedicated pedestrian and cycle paths, with a minimum width of 6.8 metres. Included in the design are high-quality landing points that connect and activate communities on either side of the Brisbane River, including upgraded public realms and enhanced connectivity for pedestrians and cyclists.

Safetylyne's advanced ladder cable system and Canopy Horizontal Lifelines and Static Lines play a crucial role in protecting maintenance staff responsible for the bridge's ongoing upkeep. These systems are designed to facilitate safe access while supporting Brisbane City Council's long-term maintenance objectives, helping to preserve the landmark's condition and potentially extending its lifespan.

== Environmental and social impact ==
The bridge incorporates design elements like solar panels, cooling vegetation, and shade cover along the length of the bridge. It features dining venues such as an above-water restaurant and bar, and a riverside café. The bridge offers panoramic views of the river and city, with rest nodes for seating and shade.

A new signalised crossing at Edward and Alice streets provides safe, continuous access between the bridge and the city centre.

== See also ==
- List of bridges in Brisbane
