= Breakfast Creek =

River in Queensland, Australia

Breakfast Enoggera Creek
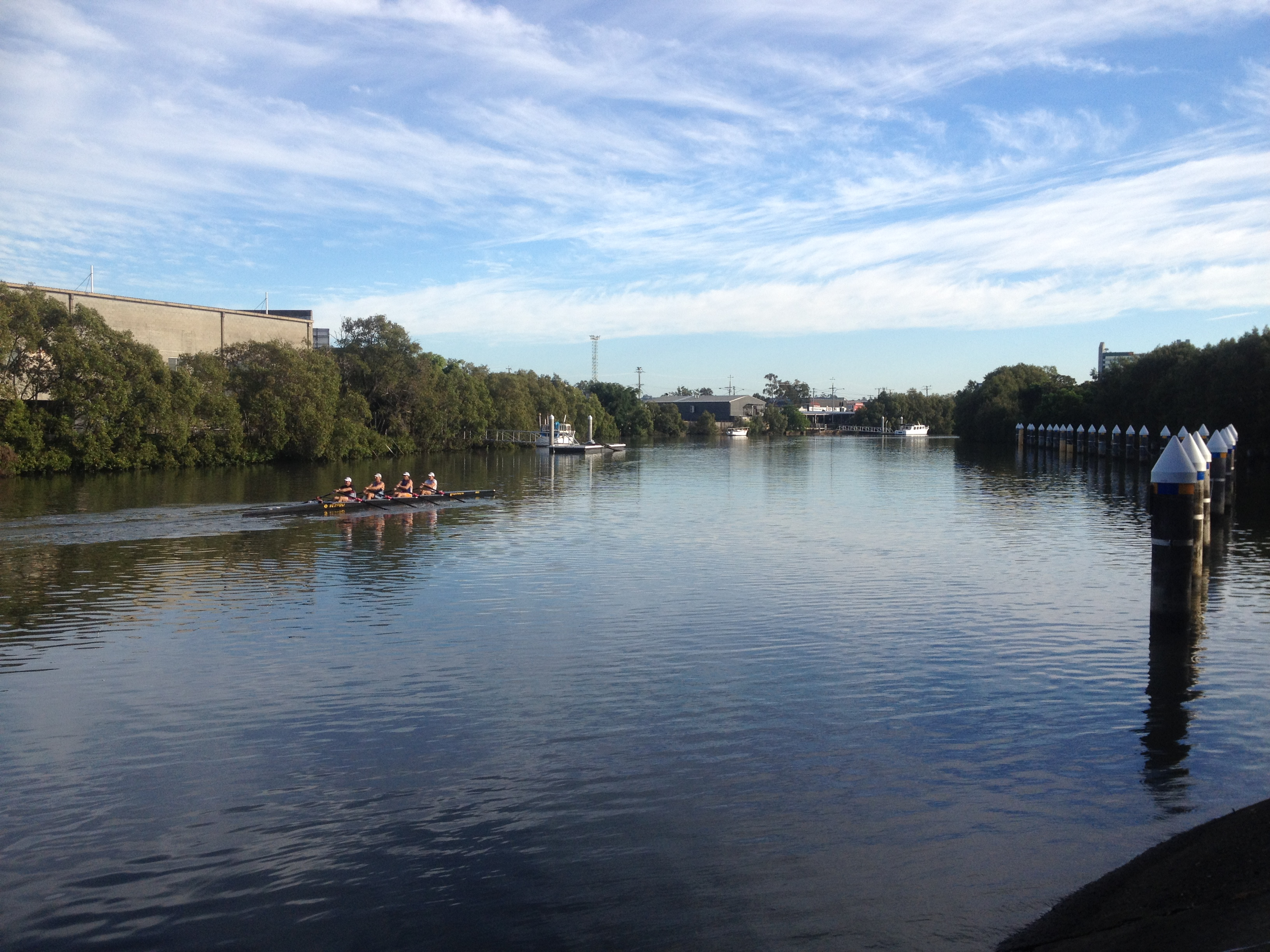
- Breakfast Creek

- Location of the Breakfast Creek mouth in Queensland
- Etymology: Derived from breakfast
- Native name: Yawagara / Enoggera (Aboriginal)

Location
- Country: Australia
- State: Queensland
- Region: South East Queensland
- City: Brisbane

Physical characteristics
- Source: D'Aguilar Range
  - location: D'Aguilar National Park
- Source confluence: Enoggera Creek
  - location: Herston
  - coordinates: 27°26′41″S 153°1′59″E
  - elevation: 2 m (6 ft 7 in)
- Mouth: confluence with the Brisbane River
  - location: Albion, Newstead
  - coordinates: 27°26′31″S 153°2′51″E
  - elevation: 1 m (3 ft 3 in)
- Length: 2 km (1.2 mi)

Basin features
- River system: Brisbane River

The Breakfast Creek (Aboriginal: Yawagara) is a small urban stream that is a tributary of the Brisbane River, located in suburban Brisbane in the South East region of Queensland, Australia.

== Course and features ==
Rising as the Enoggera Creek that drains the D'Aguilar Range in the D'Aguilar National Park, Breakfast Creek forms near Herston where it flows a short meandering course of 2 kilometres (1.2 mi) before reaching its confluence with the Brisbane River at Newstead, next to Newstead Park. Travelling up the Brisbane River, the creek is the first to join the river on its northern banks.

The heritage-listed Breakfast Creek Hotel is located near the confluence with the Brisbane River and is known for serving XXXX beer exclusively from wooden barrels. Also here the Breakfast Creek Green Bridge is under construction.

The shorter race in the annual Bridge to Brisbane fun run starts at the Breakfast Creek bridge.

== History ==
John Oxley and Allan Cunningham met members of an Aboriginal clan at the mouth of the creek in 1824. After they had breakfast at the site, minor conflict with the clan arose after one of them grabbed Oxley's hat. Oxley named the waterway in remembrance of the incident.

An important Aboriginal camping ground occupied the Breakfast Creek and Hamilton area until it was broken up by police raids in the 1860s. The camp was one of the major sources from which local Aboriginal people supplied the Moreton Bay colony with fish. It was also where Aboriginal leader Dalaipi spoke his famous "Indictments" which were published in the Moreton Bay Courier in 1858.

One of the white first settlers on the creek was Patrick Leslie who, in 1845, built the still-standing Newstead House. Brisbane's Cantonese community, who had established businesses in Fortitude Valley and built the Temple of the Holy Triad in 1886, settled in the flats around Breakfast Creek and Eagle Farm. During dry times in the early colony of Moreton Bay, when water from the Roma Street reservoir was depleted, supplies were carted from Breakfast Creek.

Various streets close to Breakfast Creek were affected by Brisbane floods in 1893, 1974 and in 2011.

== Bridges ==
The first bridge across the creek was built in 1836. A number of floods destroyed early bridges across the creek. The first permanent bridge was built in 1858 using ironbark. As the timber of the bridge eroded, a second metal bridge was built in 1889. As traffic levels over the bridge increased, it became necessary to build a third larger concrete bridge in 1958, which stands as of 2017.

Remnants of the second bridge can still be seen and are listed on the Brisbane Heritage Register.

A new rail bridge as part of Cross River Rail is due for operation by 2025.

== Gallery ==
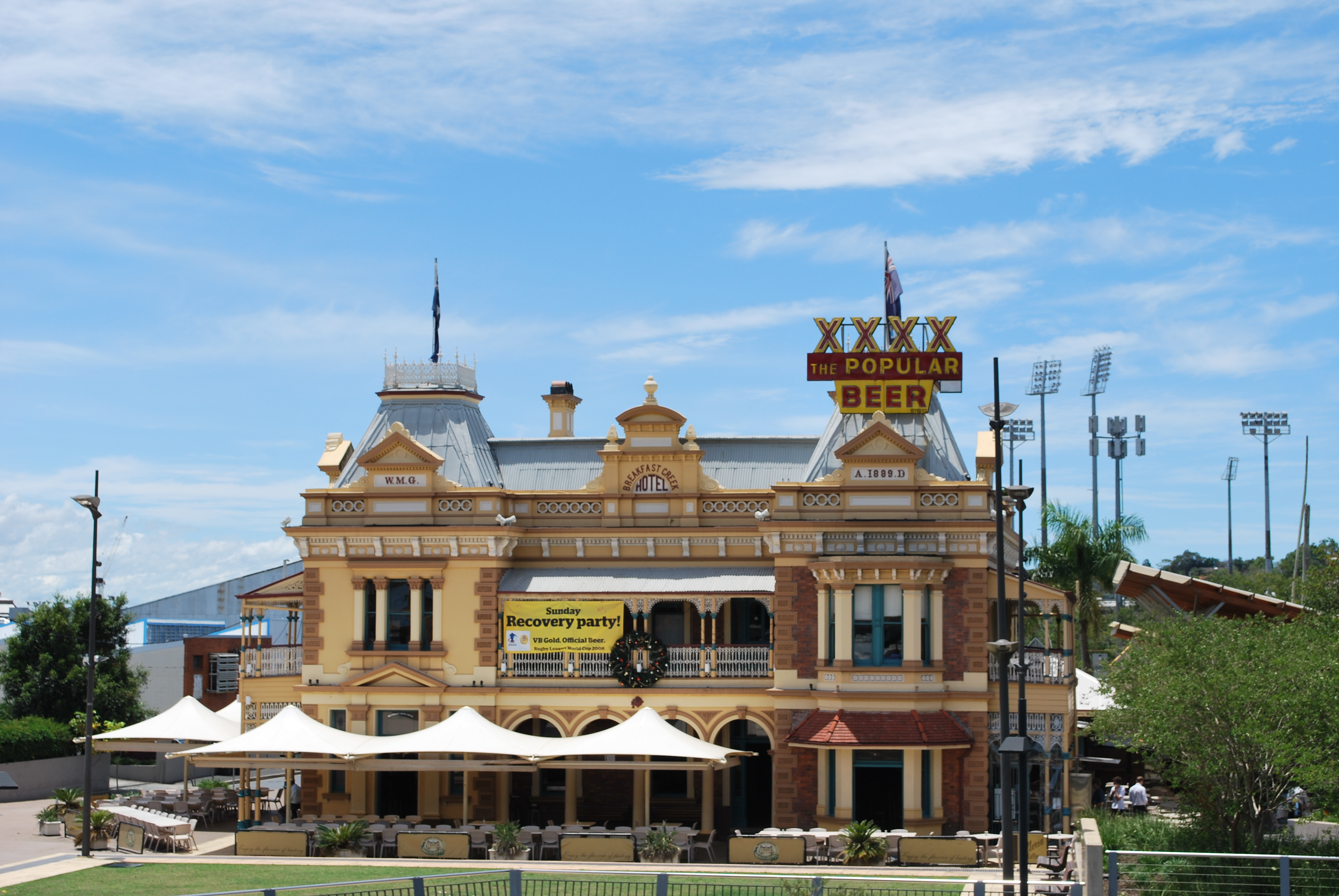
The Breakfast Creek Hotel

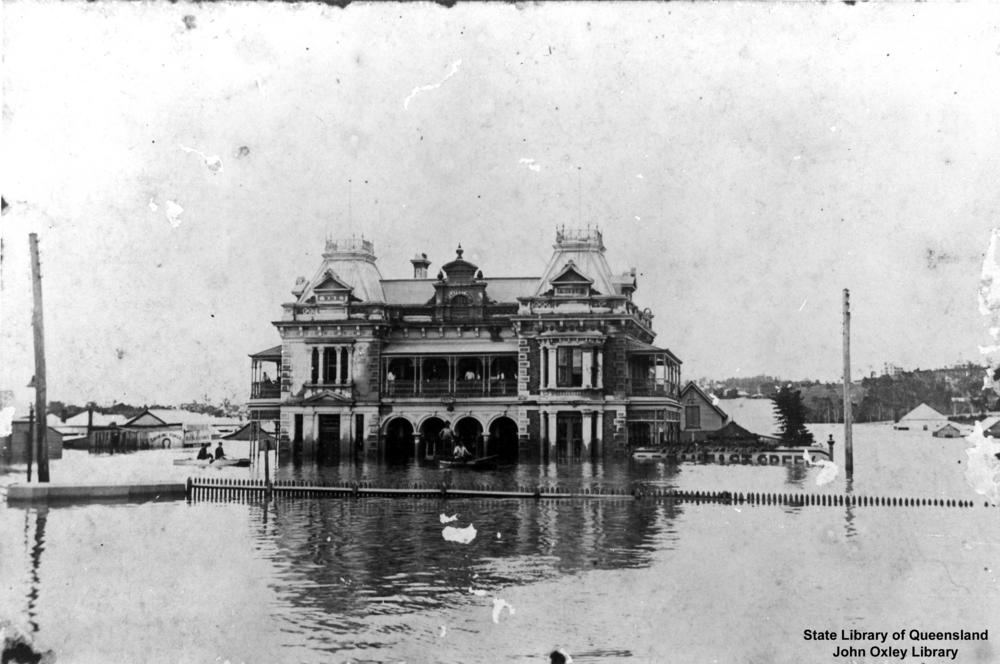
Flood waters at the Breakfast Creek Hotel, Brisbane, 1893

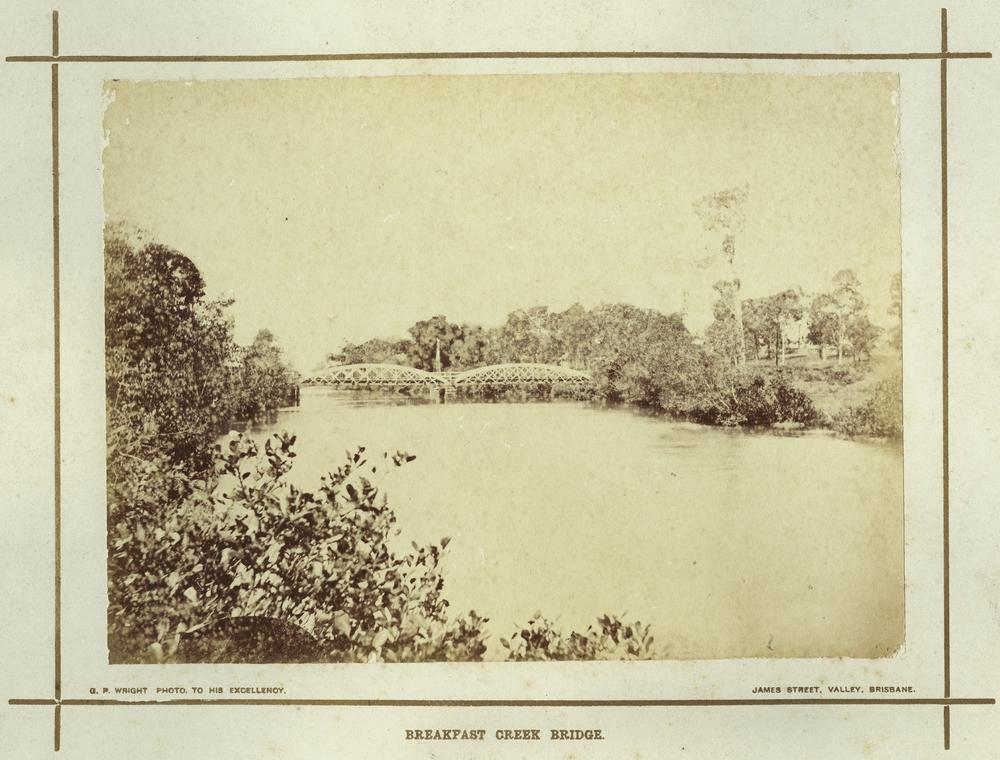
The 1858 ironbark bridge across Breakfast Creek, circa 1875

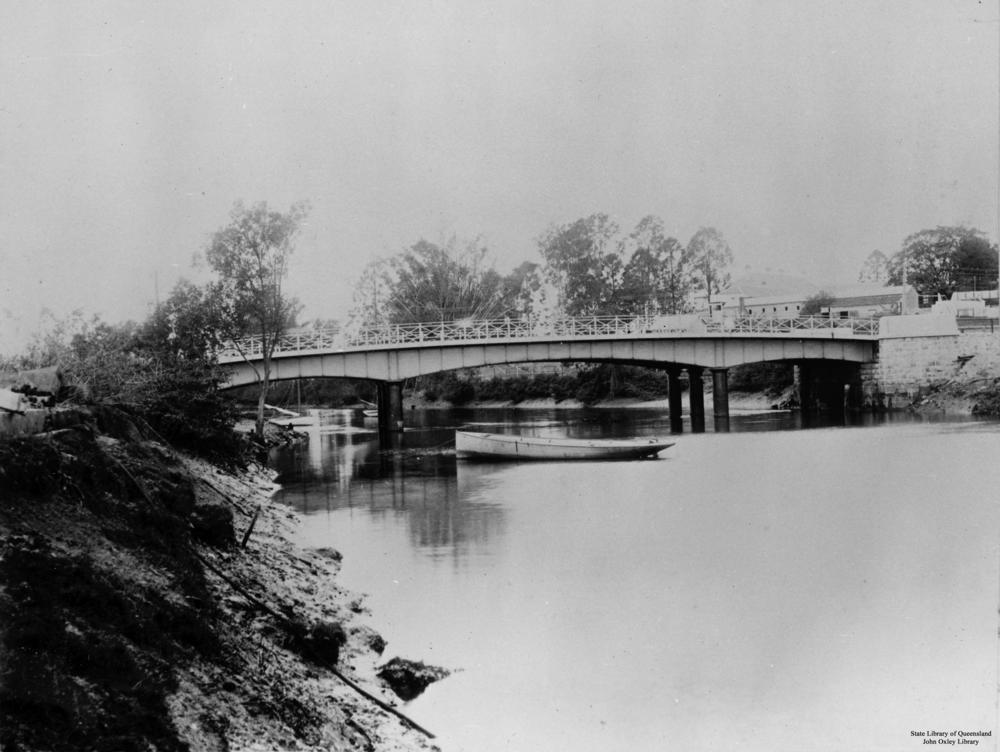
The 1889 metal bridge, circa 1889

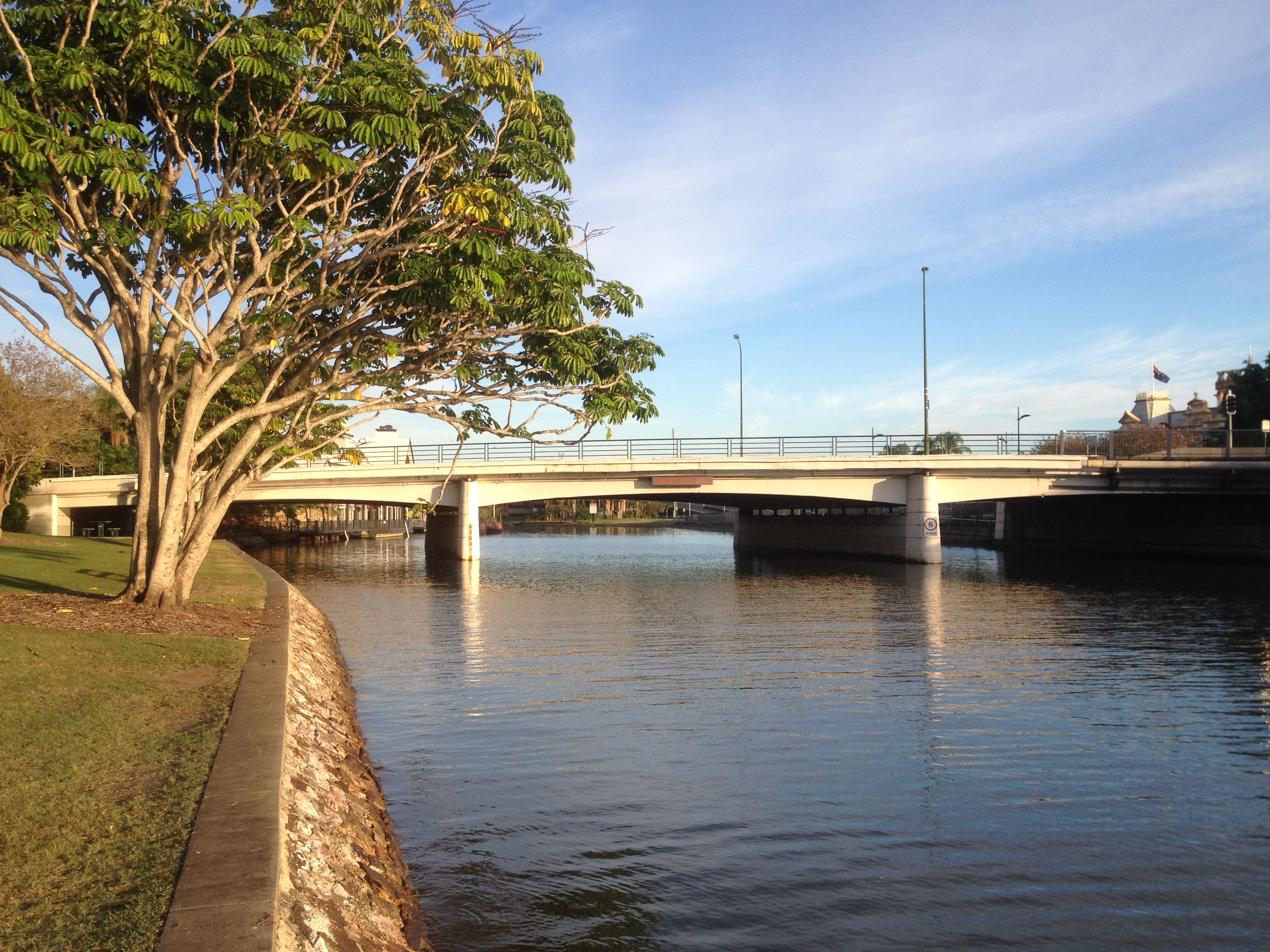
The 1958 concrete bridge

== See also ==
- List of rivers of Australia § Queensland
