= Kurilpa Bridge =

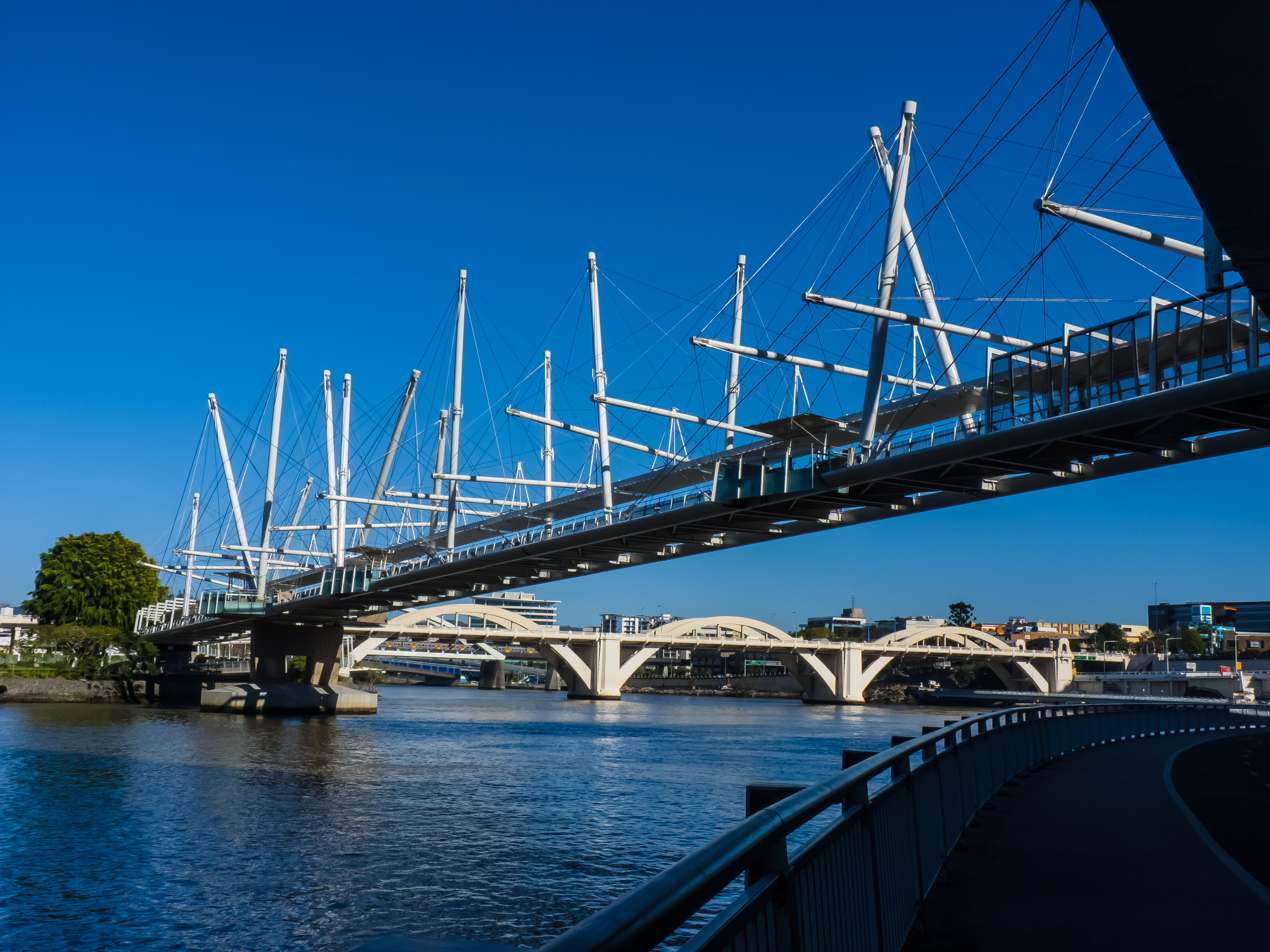
- Coordinates: 27°28′10″S 153°01′05″E
- Carries: Pedestrians and cyclists
- Crosses: Brisbane River
- Locale: Brisbane, Queensland, Australia
- Official name: Kurilpa Bridge

Characteristics
- Design: Tensegrity cable stay
- Total length: 470 metres (1,540 ft)
- Width: 6.5 metres (21 ft)
- Longest span: 120 metres (390 ft)
- Clearance below: 11 metres (36 ft) above the bank on the South Bank side

History
- Engineering design by: Ove Arup & Partners
- Opened: 4 October 2009; 17 years ago

Location
- Interactive map of Kurilpa Bridge

The Kurilpa Bridge (originally known as the Tank Street Bridge) is a A$63 million pedestrian and bicycle bridge over the Brisbane River in Brisbane, Queensland, Australia. The bridge connects Kurilpa Point in South Brisbane to Tank Street in the Brisbane central business district. In 2011, the bridge was judged World Transport Building of the Year at the World Architecture Festival.

Baulderstone built the bridge and the company's design team included Cox Rayner Architects and Arup Engineers.

A sod turning ceremony was held at Kurilpa Park, South Brisbane on 12 December 2007. The bridge was opened on 4 October 2009 by Queensland Premier Anna Bligh.

== Structure ==
Kurilpa Bridge is the world's largest hybrid tensegrity bridge. Only the horizontal spars conform to tensegrity principles. The Kurilpa Bridge is a multiple-mast, cable-stay structure based on principles of tensegrity producing a synergy between balanced tension and compression components to create a light structure which is incredibly strong.

The bridge is 470 metres (1,540 ft) long with a main span of 128 metres (420 ft) and features two large viewing and relaxation platforms, two rest areas, and a continuous all-weather canopy for the entire length of the bridge. A canopy is supported by a secondary tensegrity structure. It is estimated that 560 tonnes (620 short tons) of structural steel including 6.8 kilometres (4.2 mi) of helical strand cable are incorporated into the bridge.

The bridge structure comprises 18 structural steel bridge decks, 20 structural steel masts and 16 horizontal spars or in layman's terms horizontal masts. 72 precast concrete deck slabs sit on the main bridge deck and are secured to the steel structure and together by in-situ concrete stitch pours. The complex cabling system comprises 80 main galvanised helical strand cables and 252 tensegrity cables that are made from superduplex stainless steel. The piecing together of these elements was the highest risk on the project, where any error in the dimension of one of the elements would have halted the critical path of the project. The superstructure was within 13mm of its planned vertical position in its final state at the centre of the bridge.

The bridge is lit with a sophisticated LED lighting system which can be programmed to produce an array of different lighting effects. Depending on lighting configurations, 75%-100% of the power required is provided by solar energy.

== Naming competition ==
A public competition was held to decide on a new name for the bridge. On 23 November 2008 it was announced that the winning entry was Kurilpa Bridge, submitted by Shane Spargo of Nundah, Queensland. The name reflects the Australian Aboriginal word for the South Brisbane and West End area, and means 'place for water rats'.

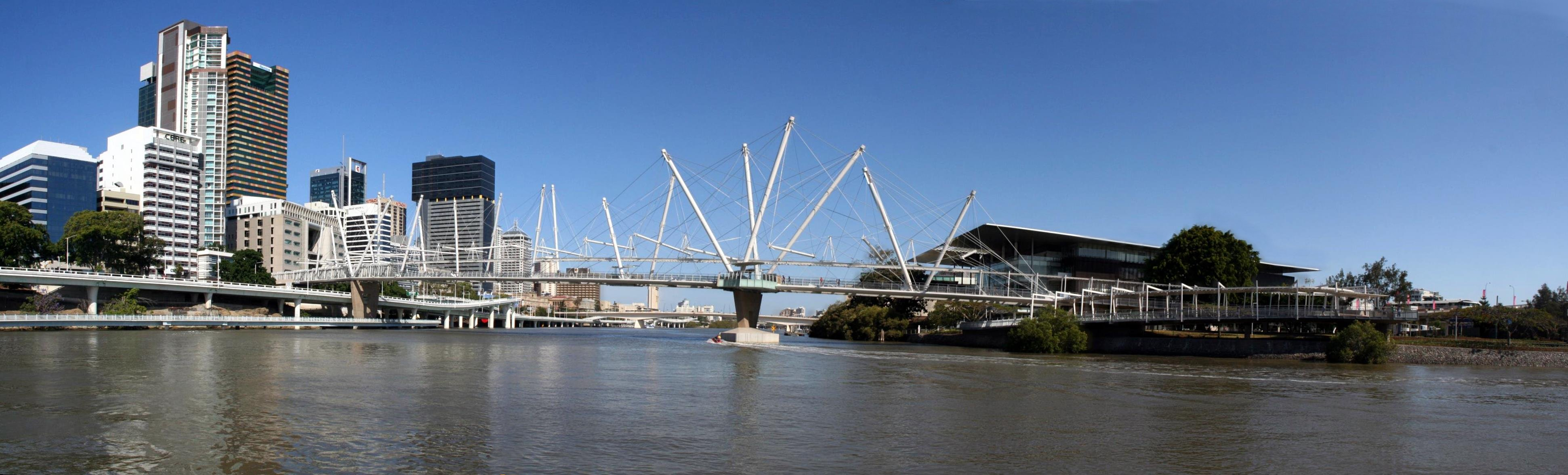
Kurilpa Bridge, 25 October 2009

== Gallery ==
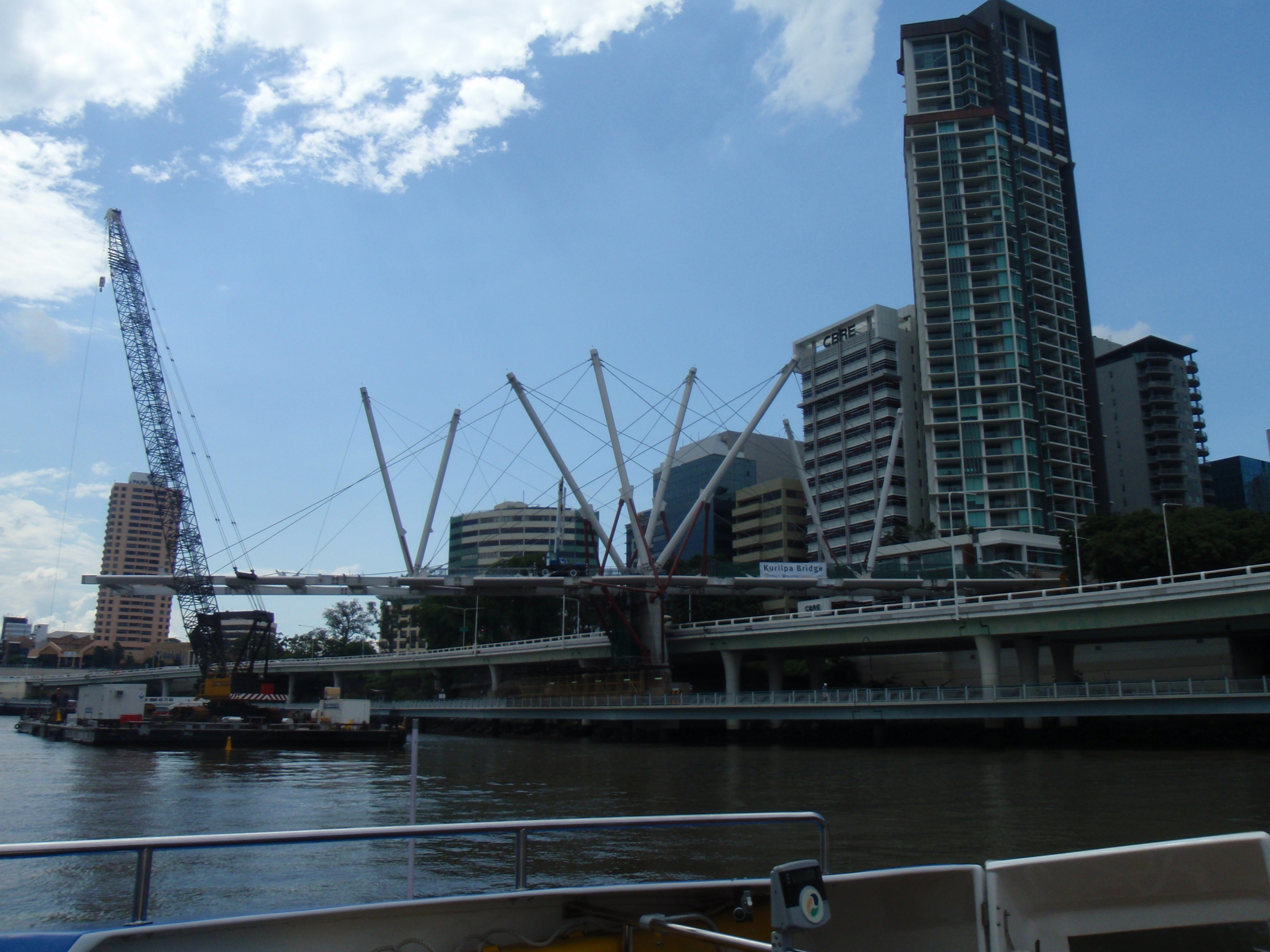
Kurilpa Bridge Construction
25 February 2009

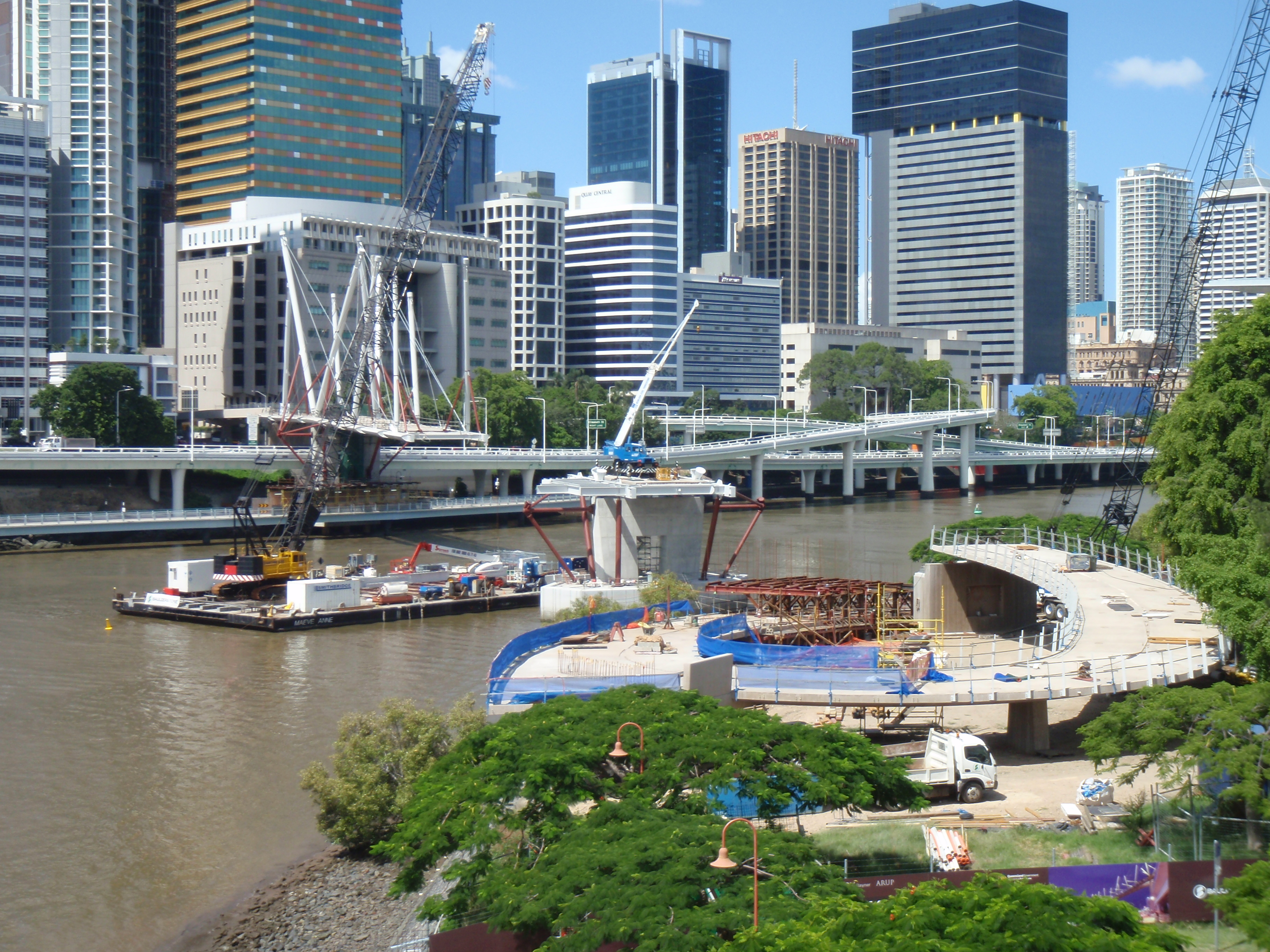
Kurilpa Bridge Construction
8 March 2009

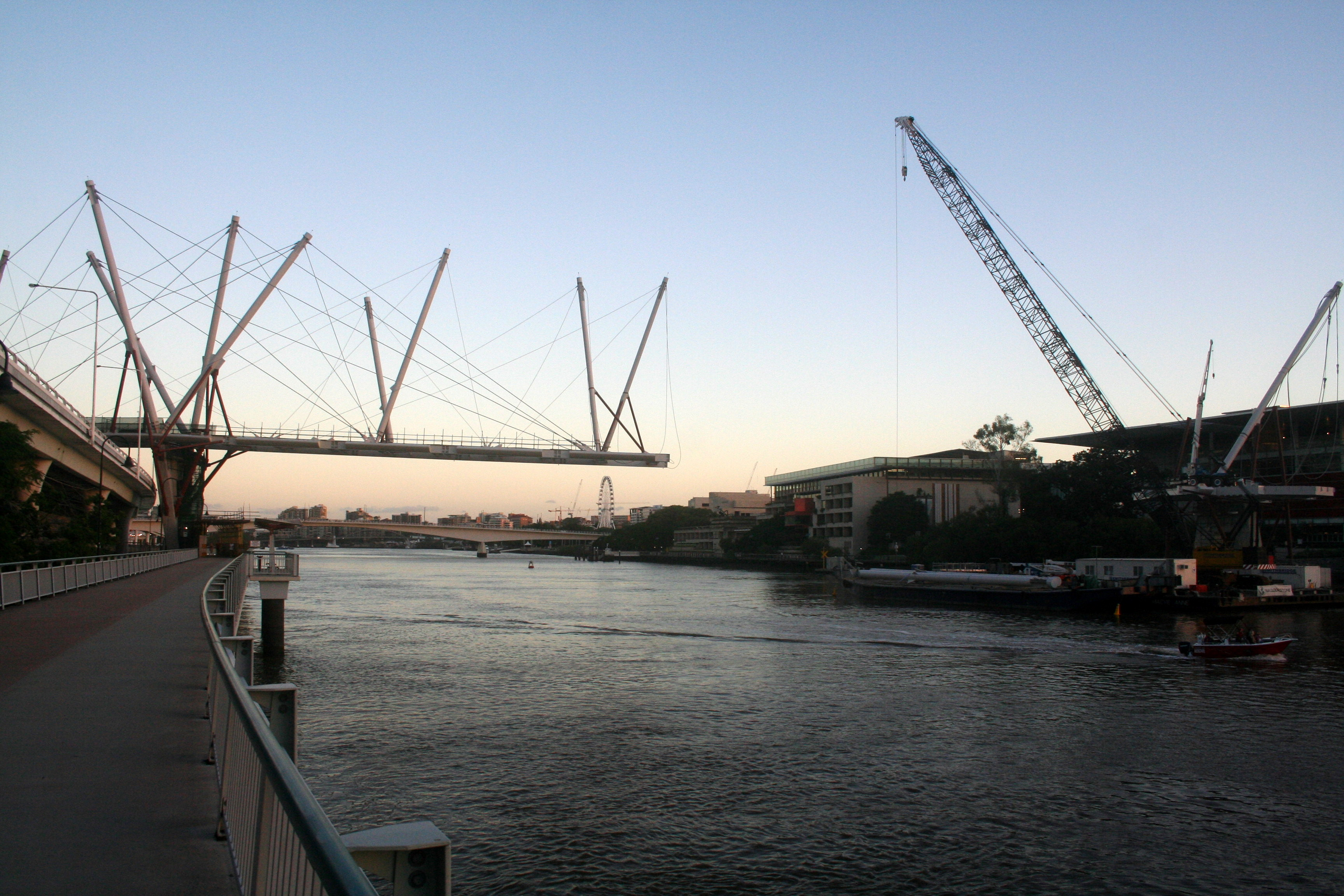
Kurilpa Bridge Construction
16 March 2009

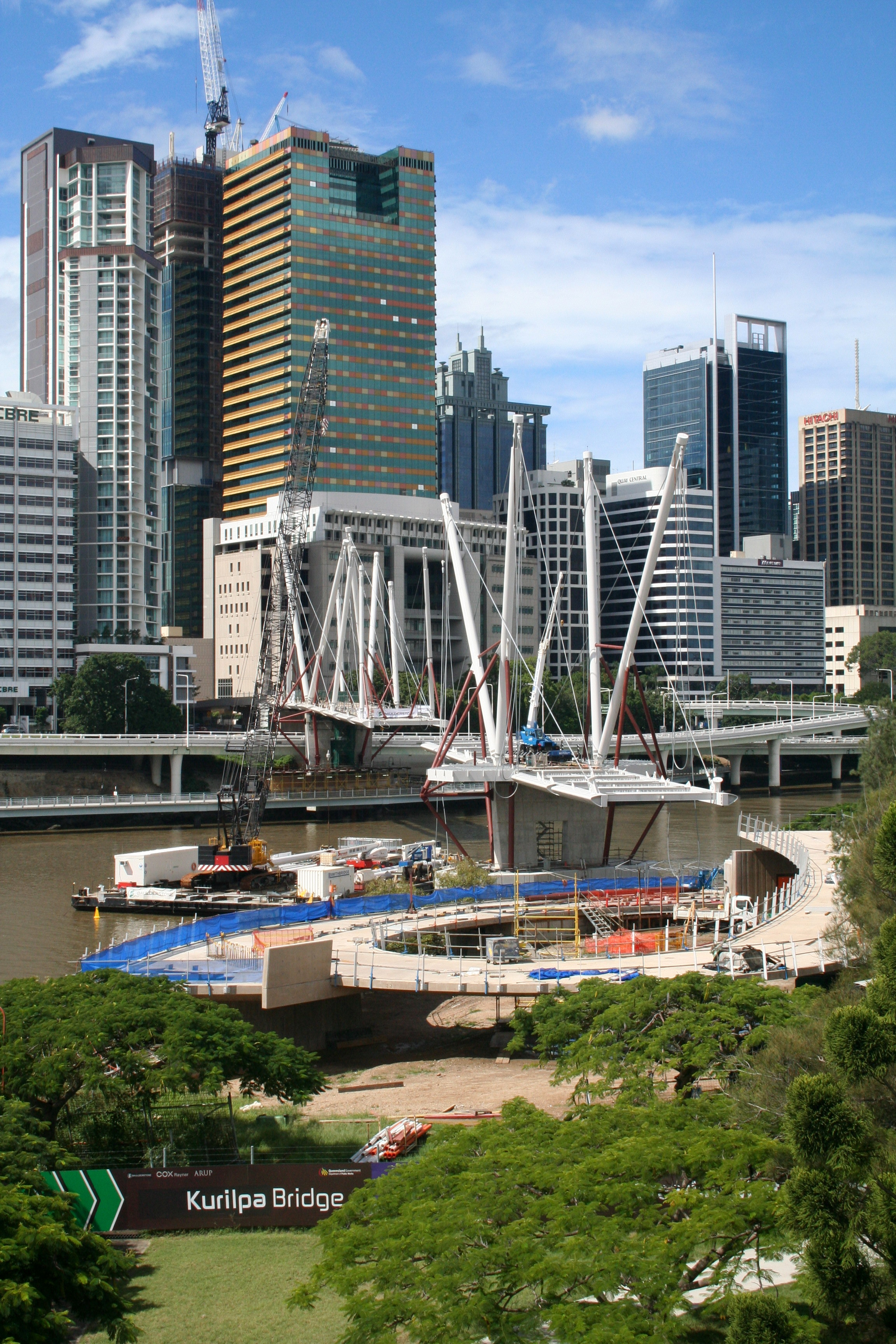
Kurilpa Bridge Construction
4 April 2009

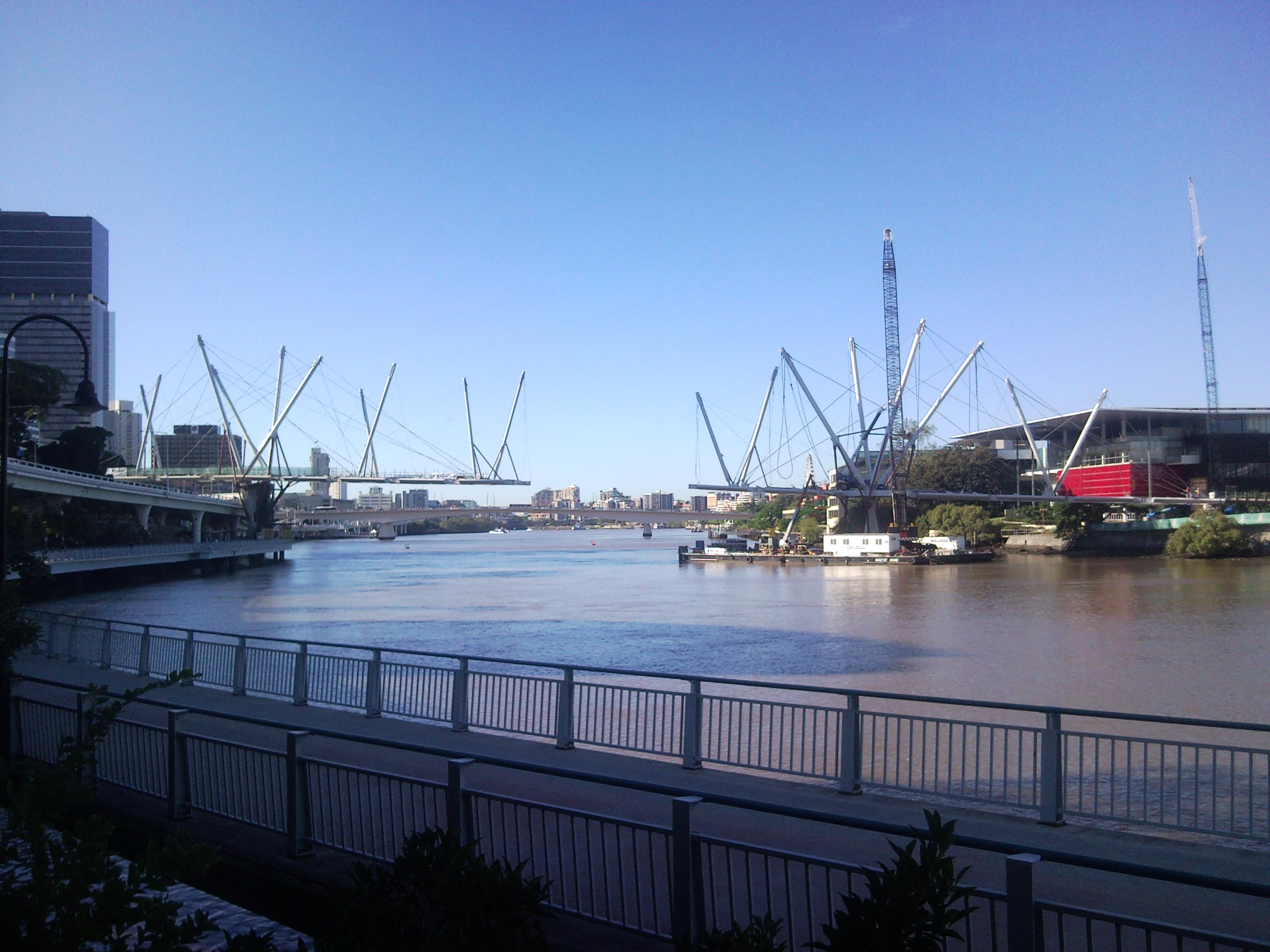
Kurilpa Bridge Construction
16 April 2009

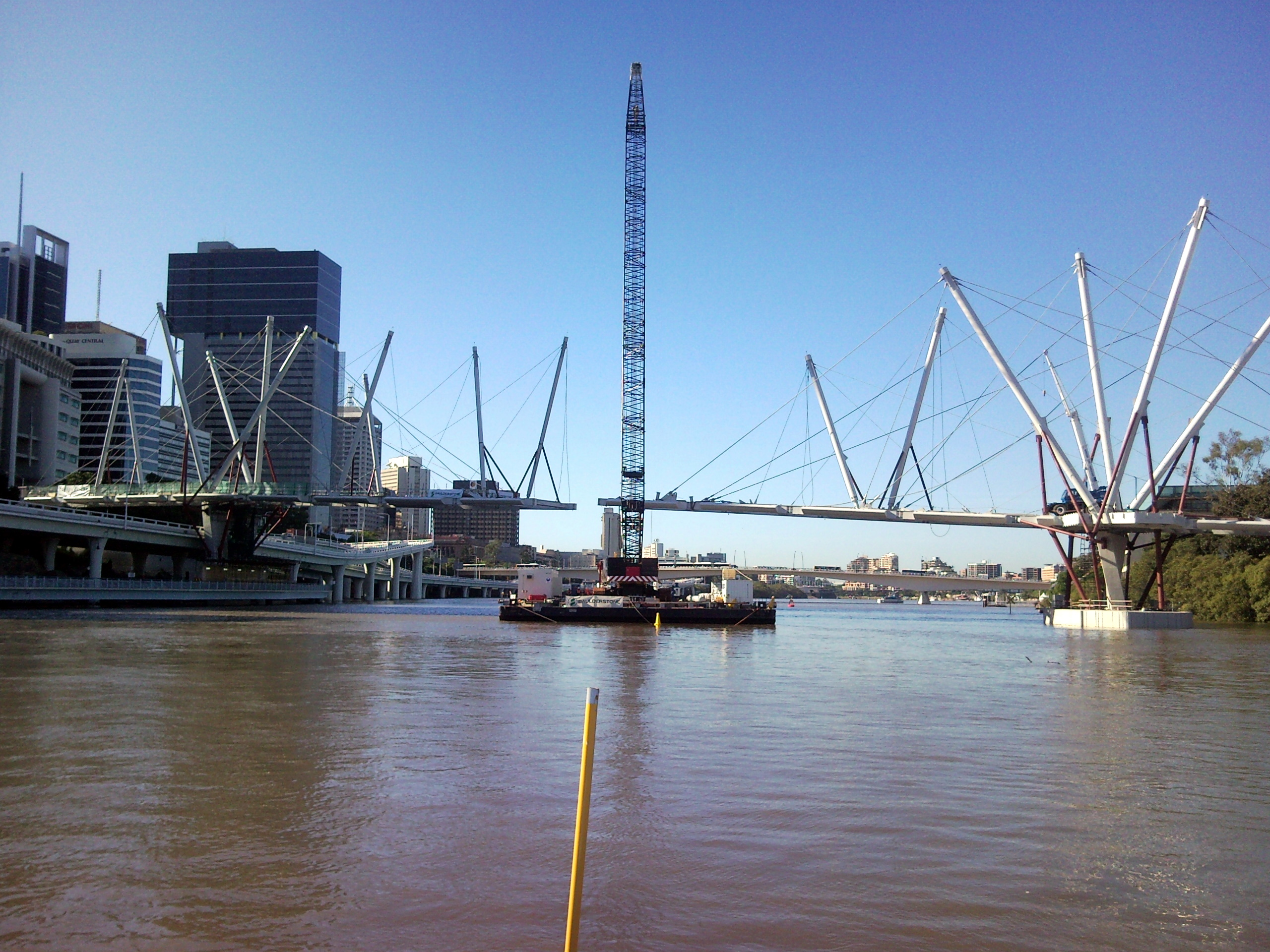
Kurilpa Bridge Construction
24 April 2009

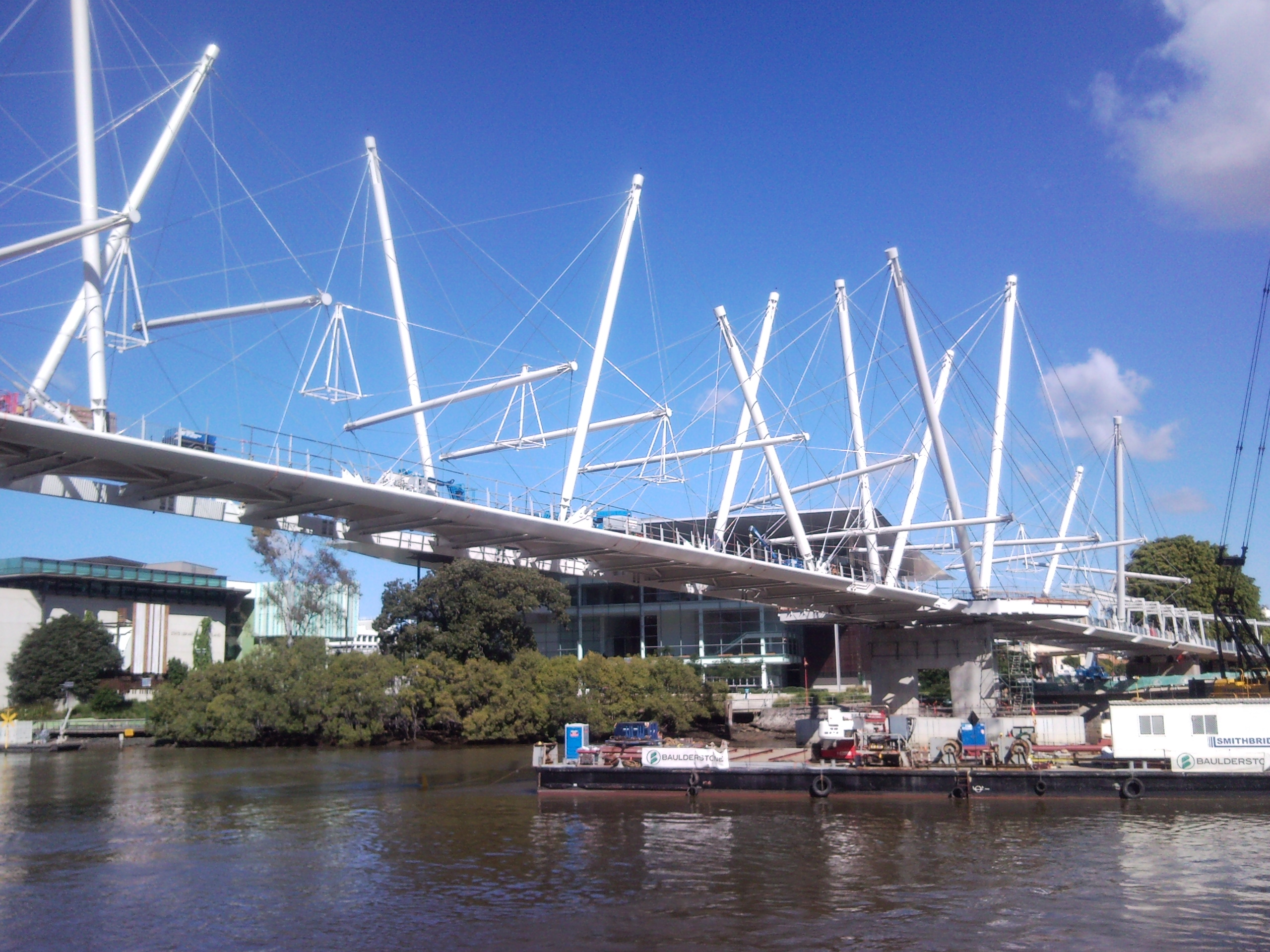
Kurilpa Bridge Construction
19 July 2009

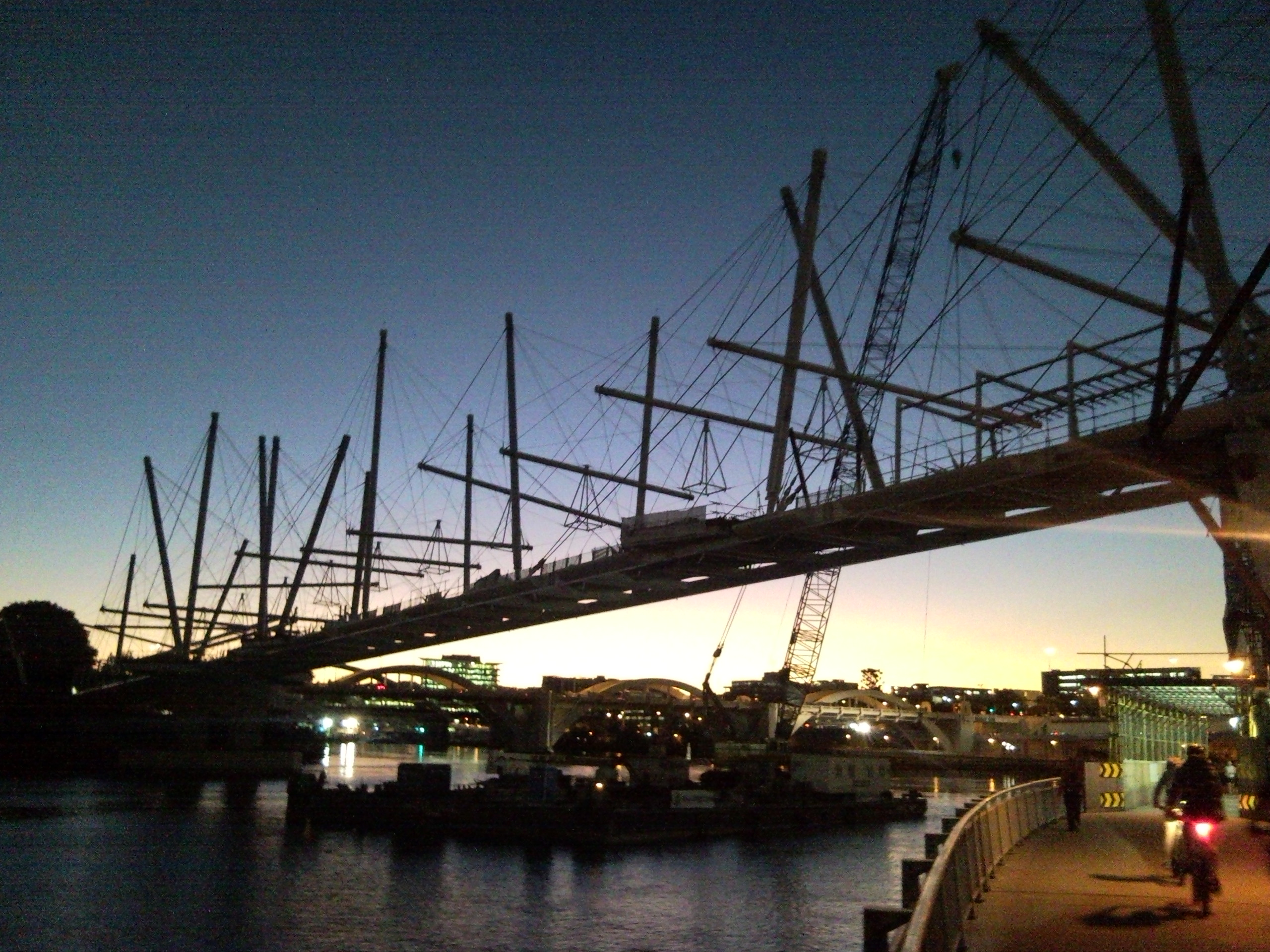
Kurilpa Bridge Construction
21 July 2009

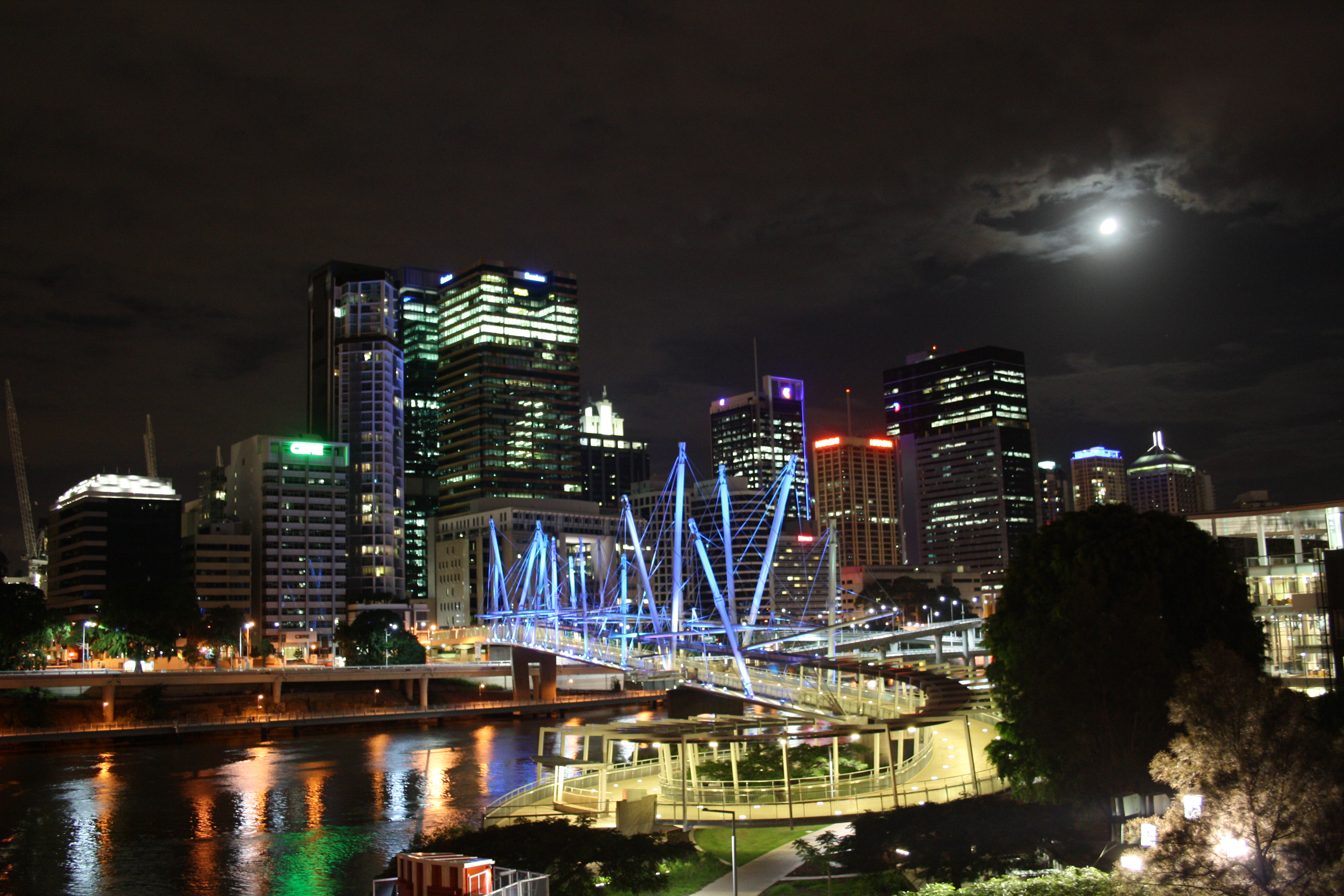
Kurilpa Bridge at night
April 2010

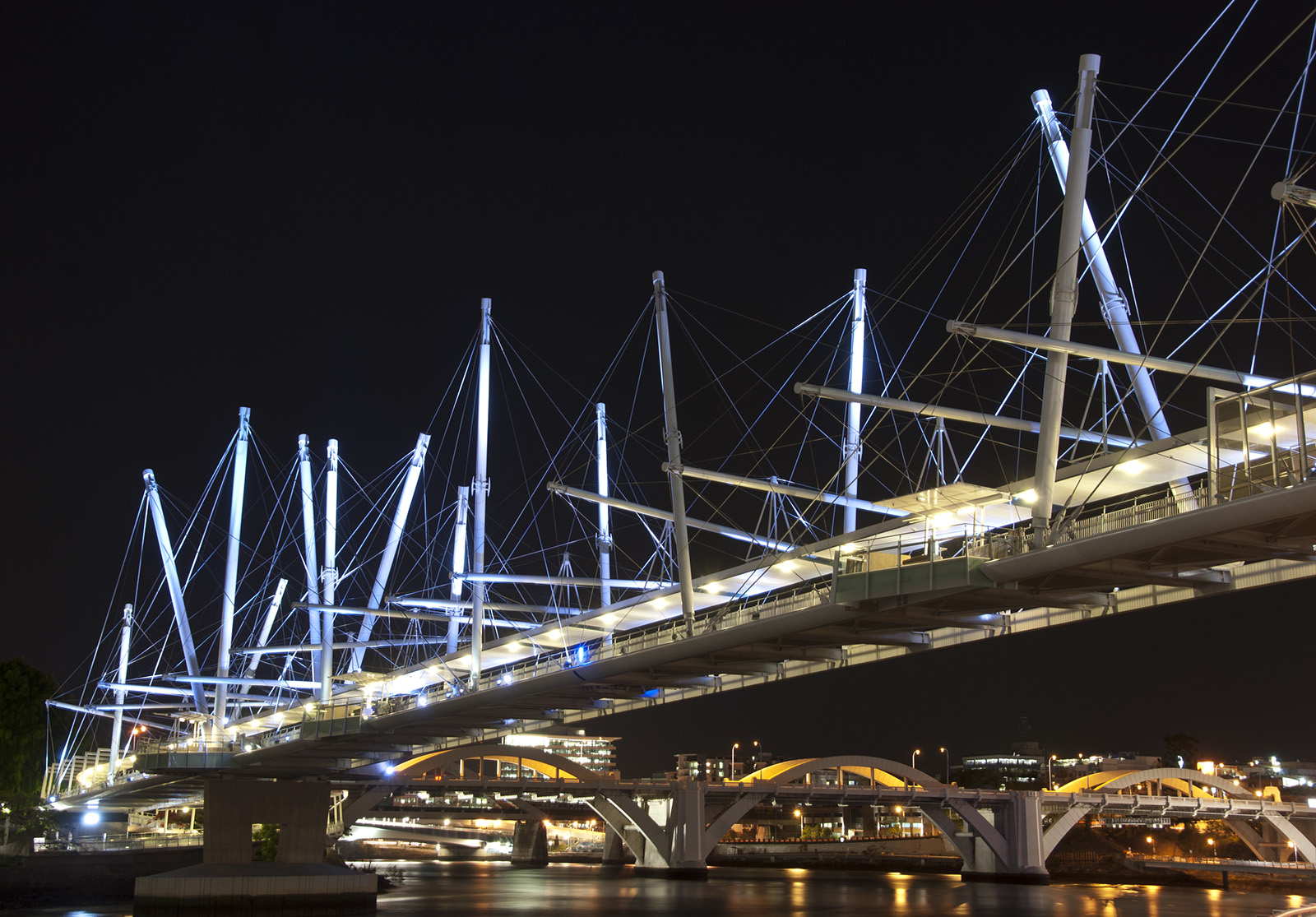
Kurilpa Bridge, Brisbane at night
15 November 2011

== See also ==
- Bridges over the Brisbane River
