= Centenary Bridge =

Centenary
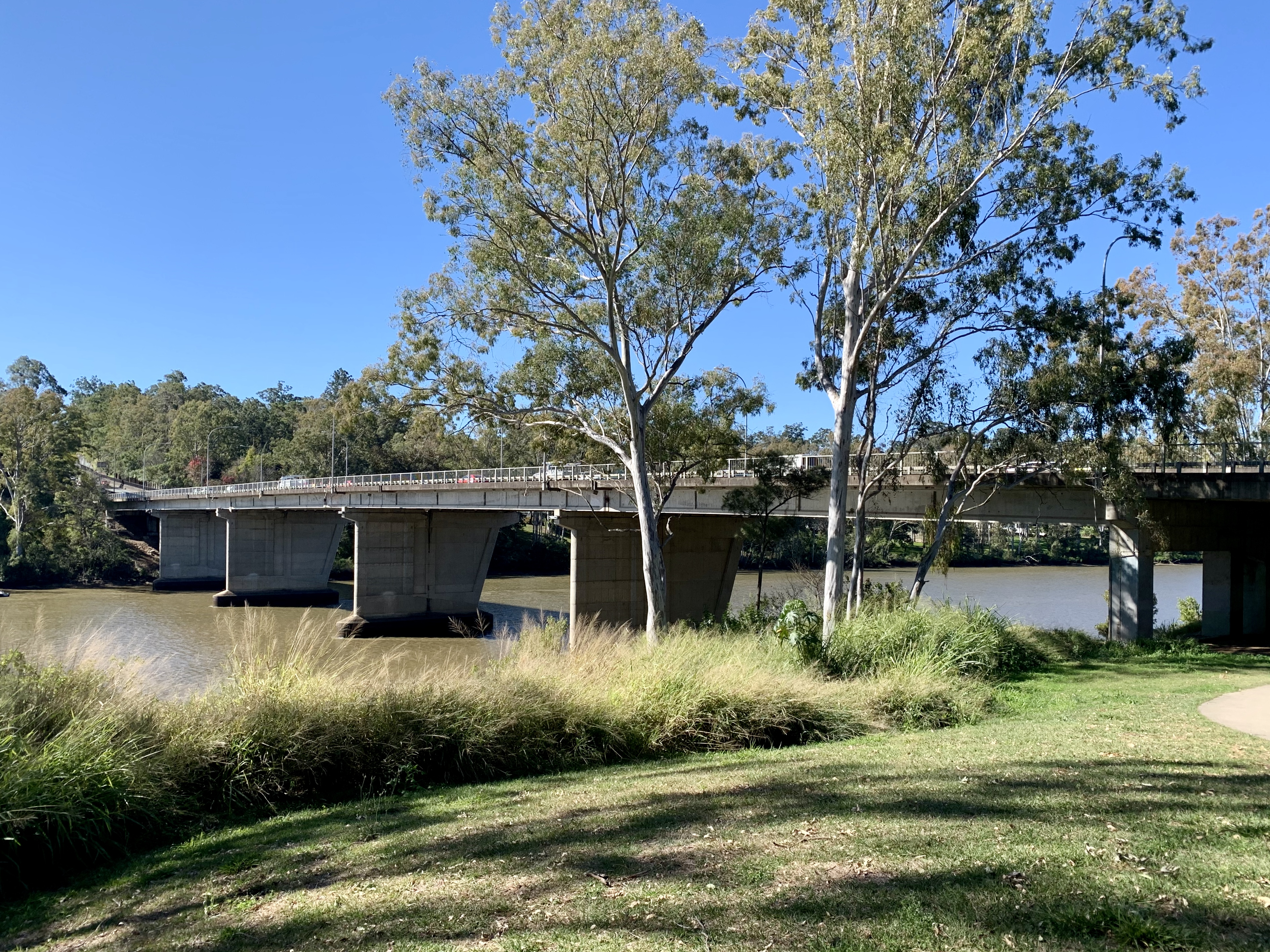
- Centenary Bridge
- Coordinates: 27.5277°S 152.9470°E
- Carries: Motor vehicles, pedestrians and cyclists
- Crosses: Brisbane River
- Locale: Brisbane, Queensland, Australia

Characteristics
- Material: Concrete
- No. of spans: 6

History
- Opened: 1964; 62 years ago

Location
- Interactive map of Centenary

The Centenary Bridge is a motorway crossing of the Brisbane River. As it forms part of Brisbane's Centenary Motorway, it is used primarily by vehicular traffic, although it includes footpaths for pedestrian traffic. The bridge was used by 85,000 vehicles per day in 2023.

== History ==
Built to service the new Centenary Suburbs of Jindalee, Mount Ommaney and Westlake, the original two lane bridge opened in 1964. It was financed by the developers of the suburbs, LJ Hooker.

The bridge was duplicated to two lanes each way as part of an upgrade of the Centenary Highway and Western Freeway south of Mount Coot-tha Road. The works were officially opened by Russell Hinze, Minister for Main Roads, on 27 March 1987.

During the 1974 floods, the bridge was badly damaged when a barge rammed into its upstream side. The barge blocked the flow of floodwaters under the bridge and there were fears that it would collapse, harming the spectators on it. The Police Commissioner Ray Whitrod ordered that dynamite be used to sink the barge to protect the bridge.

== Bridge duplication ==
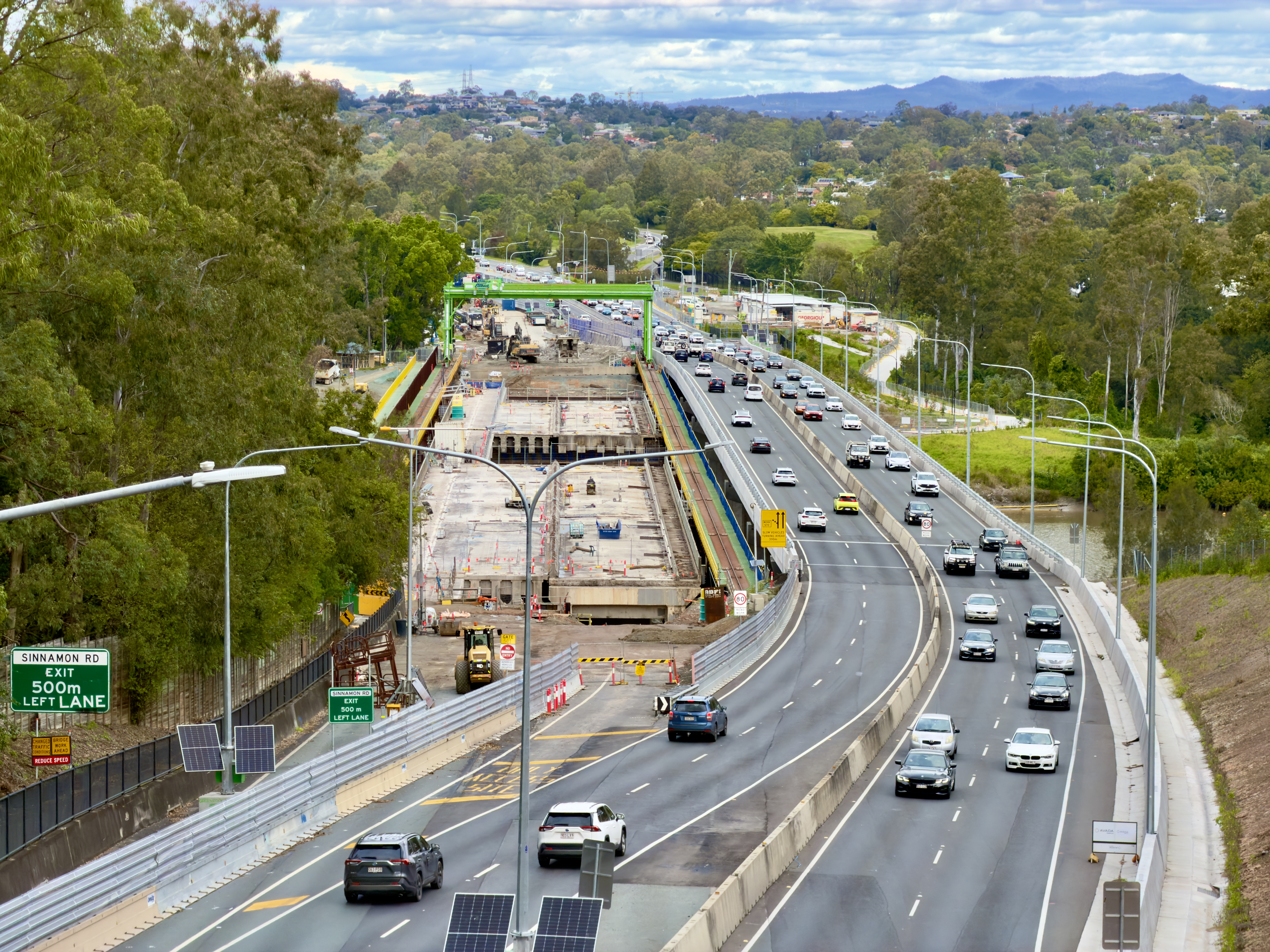
Centenary Bridge Duplication Project in 2026

A project to duplicate the Centenary Bridge to three lanes each way, at a cost of $298 million, commenced construction on 20 April 2023. The work will involve two stages. The first stage will build a second adjacent bridge which will have four narrow lanes, expected to open in 2025. The second stage will be an upgrade of the current bridge. When completed in 2027, the two bridges will each carry three lanes of traffic.
