= Airport Flyover, Brisbane =

Airport Flyover
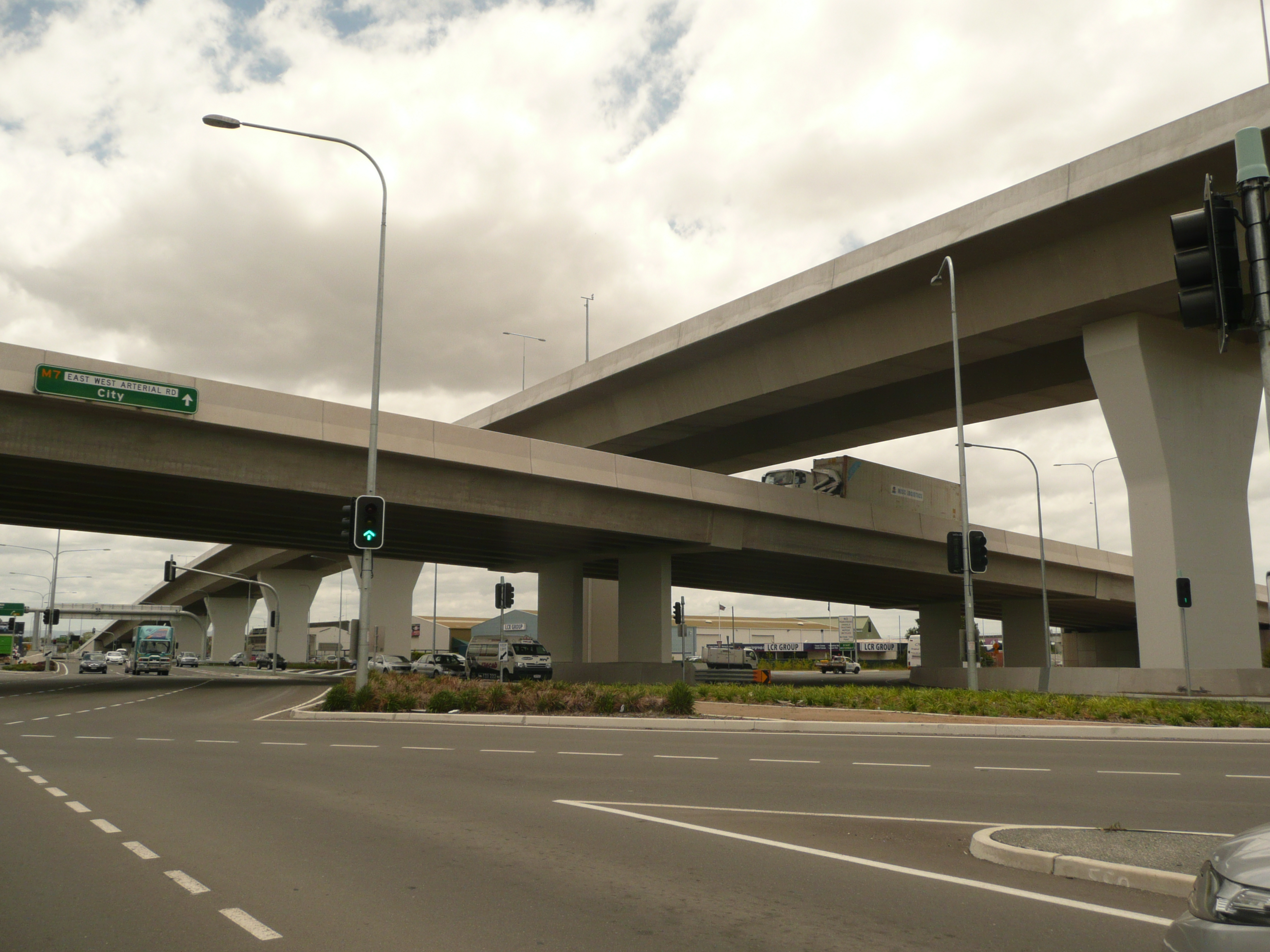
- Airport Flyover over the Southern Cross Way
- Coordinates: 27°24′43.56″S 153°04′38.13″E
- Carries: Motor vehicles
- Crosses: Southern Cross Way overpass
- Locale: Brisbane, Queensland
- Maintained by: Department of Transport and Main Roads

Characteristics
- Design: Cantilever bridge
- Material: Prestressed concrete
- Total length: 750 metres (2,460 ft)
- No. of spans: 12
- Clearance below: 19.5 metres (64 ft)

History
- Constructed by: Thiess/John Holland Group joint venture
- Construction start: April 2009
- Construction end: 2011; 14 years ago
- Opened: 8 November 2010 (eastbound lanes), 28 February 2011 (westbound lanes)

The Airport Flyover is a road bridge over the Southern Cross Way in Brisbane, Queensland, Australia. The Airport Flyover links the Airport Link toll road with Airport Drive providing direct access to Brisbane Airport terminals. The East bound lanes were opened in early November 2010, more than a year earlier than originally planned. The westbound lanes were opened on 28 February 2011.

The Airport Flyover is a four lane, 750-metre (2,460 ft) long cantilever bridge over the Southern Cross Way overpass. Construction began in April 2009. The total cost for the roundabout upgrade cost A$327 million and it was designed and built by a Thiess/John Holland Group joint venture. 10 minutes of travel time is expected to be saved by construction of the bridge.

The Airport Flyover with an intersection below, replaced the Airport Roundabout which was described as the worst congestion black spot in the South East Queensland. Up to 17 million vehicles crossed the intersection every year.

== See also ==
- Airport Link, Brisbane
