= Captain Cook Bridge, Brisbane =

Captain Cook Bridge
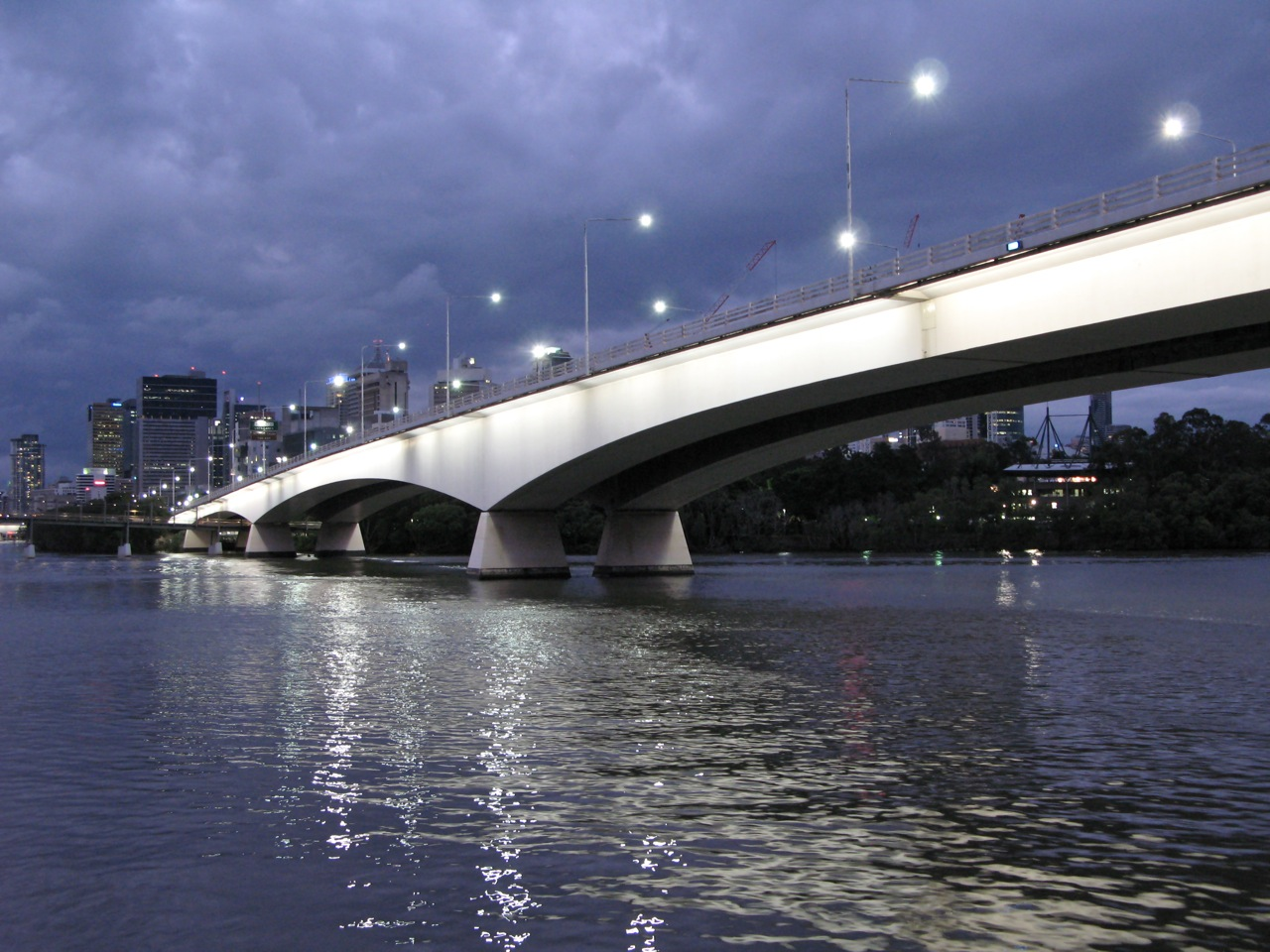
- Captain Cook Bridge, Brisbane
- Coordinates: 27°28′50″S 153°01′45″E
- Carries: Pacific Motorway (Motor vehicles: eight lanes)
- Crosses: Brisbane River
- Locale: Brisbane, Queensland, Australia
- Official name: Captain Cook Bridge
- Named for: Captain James Cook
- Preceded by: Goodwill Bridge
- Followed by: Story Bridge

Characteristics
- Material: Concrete box girder
- Total length: 555 metres (1,821 ft)
- Longest span: 183 metres (600 ft)
- Clearance below: 12.7 metres (42 ft)

History
- Designer: Albert Contessa (Chief Engineer)
- Contracted lead designer: Co-Ordinator Generals Department
- Constructed by: Transfield Constructions
- Construction start: 1968
- Construction end: 1972
- Construction cost: $24 million
- Opened: 1972; 54 years ago

Statistics
- Daily traffic: ~150,000 (as of 2007)

Location
- Interactive map of Captain Cook Bridge

The Captain Cook Bridge is a road bridge that carries the Pacific Motorway over the Brisbane River in Brisbane, Queensland, Australia. It was built exclusively for vehicular traffic and was completed in late 1972. The bridge had its naming ceremony on 13 December 1972 and officially opened on 7 March 1973. Shortly before it opened to vehicular traffic, a one-off pedestrian walk across the bridge was held on 21 January 1973, organised by the Rotary Club of Stones Corner. The bridge crosses at the South Brisbane Reach of the river, linking the Riverside Expressway and central business district on the north side to Kangaroo Point, South Brisbane and Woolloongabba on the south side.

== Location and features ==
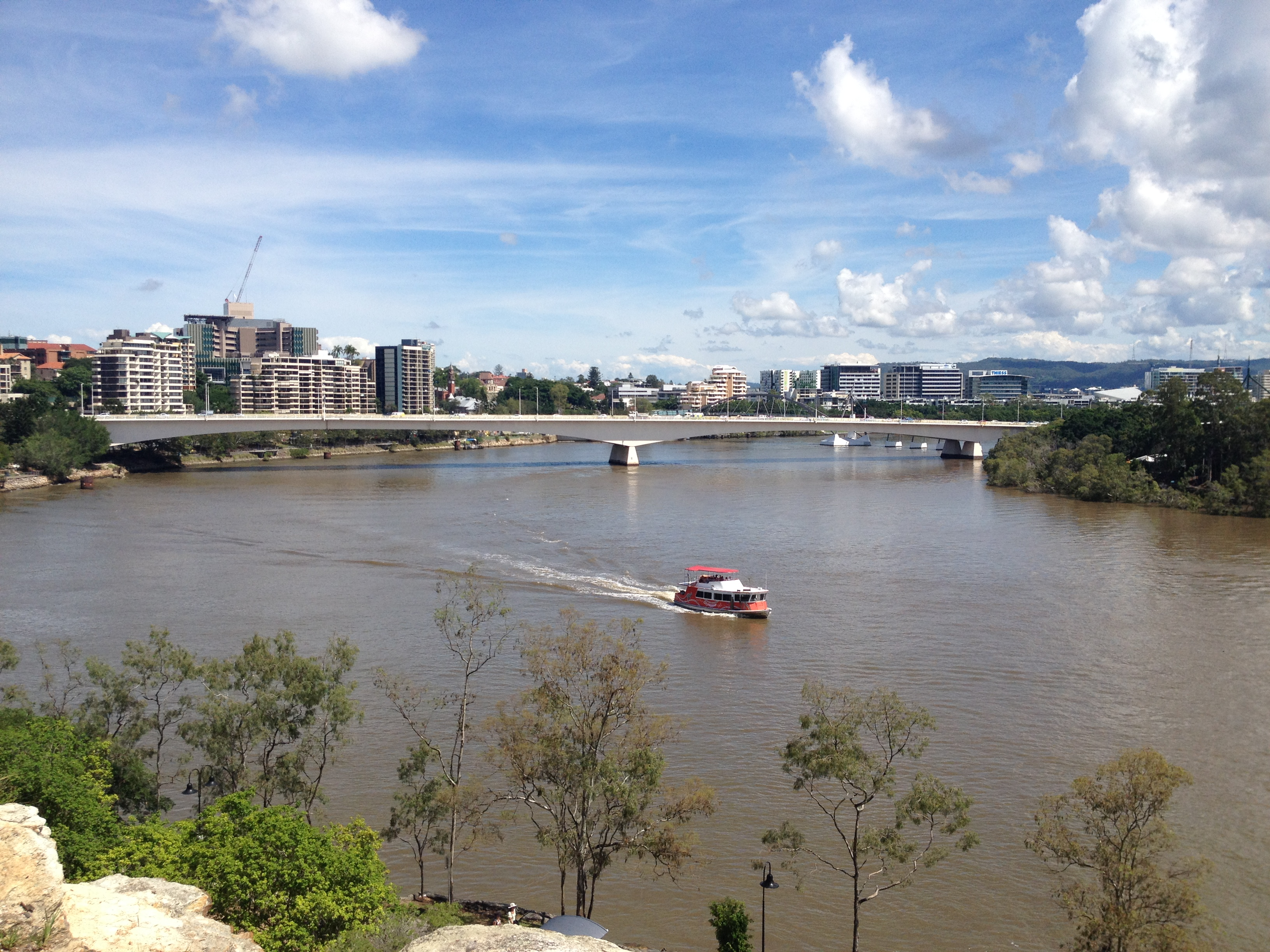
The Captain Cook Bridge, as viewed from Kangaroo Point Cliffs.

Captain Cook Bridge is constructed as a multi–span, precast prestressed concrete free-cantilever bridge with drop-in mid-spans. Comprising a dual carriageway that creates two separate bridges, one for each direction of traffic, heading north–south over the Brisbane River. Each bridge carries four lanes of traffic in one direction and links the M3 Pacific Motorway to the M3 Riverside Expressway. It is the main route from the city's south into the Brisbane central business district.

At the time of completion, the main span of 183 metres (600 ft) held the world record for this type of structure for a period of three months, when it was superseded by the Harada Bridge in Japan with a span of 241 metres (791 ft).

The structure is Queensland's busiest traffic bridge with more than one million vehicles crossing it weekly in 2007.

Downstream from the Captain Cook Bridge is the Story Bridge, while the Goodwill Bridge is the next crossing upstream.

Concerns were raised in 2007 about the structure's integrity after it was revealed that contractors who attached a gantry to the bridge had drilled numerous holes which had damaged steel reinforcement bars. After investigations were completed it was concluded that the damage was insignificant as only 57 vertical steel bars out of 21,000 had been cut.

== Upgrades ==
A maintenance project, started in late 2019, and estimated to cost $26 million, was still ongoing in July 2022.

== See also ==
- Bridges over the Brisbane River
- Road transport in Brisbane
