= Sunnyside, Kangaroo Point =

Heritage listed building in Brisbane, Australia

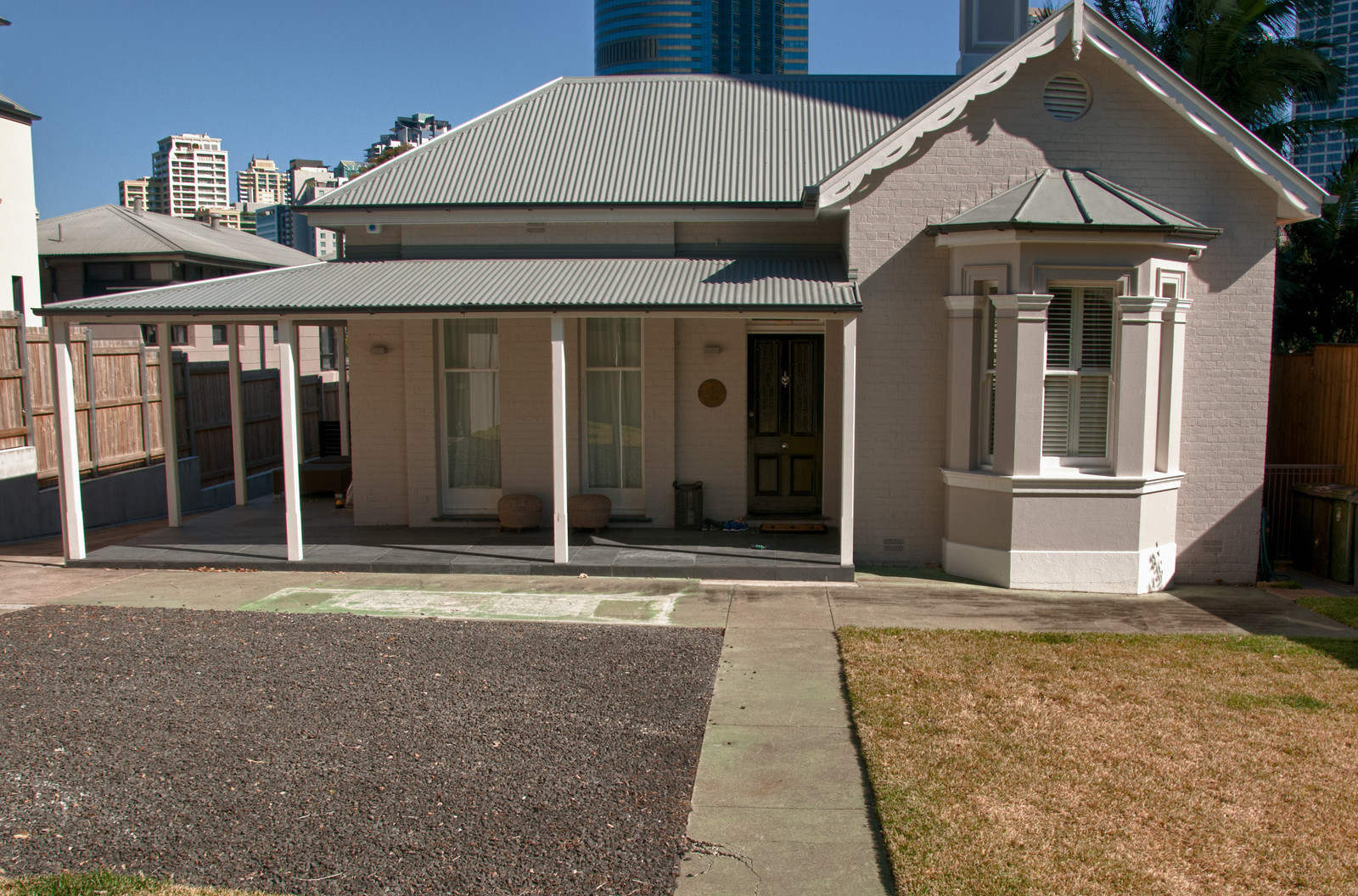
- Sunnyside, 2011

- Location within Queensland Location within Australia
- 27.47°S 153.035°E
- Location: 255 Main Street, Kangaroo Point, Queensland, Australia

History
- Design period: 1870s–1890s (late 19th century)
- Built: c. 1895–1920s

Queensland Heritage Register
- Official name: Sunnyside, Dr Wright's House
- Type: state heritage (landscape, built)
- Designated: 28 July 2000
- Reference no.: 601810
- Significant period: 1890s–1920s (fabric); 1890s (historical) early 1940s – late 1940s (social)
- Significant components: service corridor, pavilion, kitchen/kitchen house, residential accommodation – main house, cellar, views from, pathway/walkway

Sunnyside is a heritage-listed detached house at 255 Main Street, Kangaroo Point, Queensland, Australia. It was built from c. 1895 to 1920s. It is also known as Dr Wright's House and was added to the Queensland Heritage Register on 28 July 2000.

== History ==
Sunnyside was constructed in the mid-1890s, on land owned by Joseph Thompson, a Sydney businessman who held substantial property assets on Kangaroo Point. The house functioned as a rental property until acquired by Dr Robert Wright, a Brisbane dentist, in 1920.

The site was part of a larger parcel of land (3 acres 2 roods 39 perches) acquired in three allotments (1–3) by Thomas Adams, a North Brisbane solicitor, at the first sale of Brisbane suburban allotments at Kangaroo Point held in December 1843. The purchased blocks were on the western side of Main Street, extending from the road to the Brisbane River. Kangaroo Point at this period was emerging not only as Brisbane's first suburb, but also as a rival to South Brisbane, attracting industry (a boiling down works and wool store) and shipping. All of the 1843 allotments were located near the wharf reserve, and were offered at a premium upset price of £5 per acre. Most had been cleared by 1837 as part of a former convict farm, but suburban allotments 1 and 2 were still covered in brush.

Adams' land passed to a trustee in March 1846, and in March 1861 two of the subdivisions (suburban allotments 1 and 2 - comprising 2 acres 1 rood 33 perches) were conveyed to Sydney businessman Joseph Thompson. Thompson held this and (reputedly) other Kangaroo Point property, until his death in 1902, but did not reside there. He developed the eastern half of the site, fronting Main Street, with investment houses, including an 1860s duplex Silverwells and Sunnyside (1890s). From mid-1891 Thompson leased the western half of the land, with its river frontages, to the Australasian United Steam Navigation Company (initially held on a 25-year lease). The AUSN Co. established their workshops here and erected a wharf on the riverbank, directly opposite their Mary Street wharf, on the city side of the Brisbane River.

From photographic evidence and Queensland Post Office Directories, it appears that the house known by 1904 as Sunnyside, and later as Dr Wright's House, was erected in the mid-1890s, possibly occupied by 1896. It is not known who designed the house, but the style and materials suggest perhaps a Sydney architect. By the late 19th century, Kangaroo Point, with its ferry access to the adjacent Brisbane central business district, had become a fashionable residential address, particularly with central city business persons. A number of substantial homes were erected here in the late 19th/early 20th centuries, including Leckhampton c. 1889 for Brisbane jeweller Charles Snow and Lamb House c. 1902 for Brisbane draper John Lamb. The construction of Sunnyside in the mid-1890s, so much later than the adjacent 1860s residence, illustrates the continued popularity of Kangaroo Point with middle class residents. From c. 1897 until c. 1903, 255 Main Street was tenanted by Charles M Foster of Foster and Foster, ironmongers - Foster had moved here from Shafston House at Kangaroo Point, which he apparently still owned. The Schureck family occupied the house from c. 1906 to c. 1920. Julius Schureck was an Adelaide Street retailer.

Following Joseph Thompson's death at Woolloomooloo in Sydney in May 1902, his Kangaroo Point property passed to his son, civil engineer William Mann Thompson of Sydney. In 1920 WM Thompson subdivided and sold the property. Title to 255 Main Street (subdivision 3 of suburban allotments 1 & 2, par South Brisbane (38.3 perches)) was transferred from Thompson to Robert Wright, a Fortitude Valley dentist, in October 1920. Wright undertook some small alterations to the place, and c. 1923 erected a garage in the grounds. He may also have been responsible for the addition of the large pavilion room (originally perhaps a sleeping verandah) at the rear of the house. The house has remained in the Wright family since. Title was transferred from Robert Wright to Wright and his three surviving children (Robert James, Edgar David and Eveline Violet) in 1945. Following the death of Robert Wright in 1952, Robert James Wright (the eldest son, who had followed his father into dentistry) applied to the Brisbane City Council in 1957–58 to convert the house into two flats. It is understood he occupied one half of the house, and later his sister-in-law took the other. From 1964, title was held solely by Dr RJ Wright, who died in the early 1990s. RJ Wright was the Chilean Consul in Brisbane, possibly from just after the Second World War until his death. He resided most of his life at Sunnyside, which served as the Chilean Consulate in Brisbane for over 40 years.

Sunnyside is once again a single home, currently occupied by a grand-niece of RJ Wright.

== Description ==
Sunnyside is a substantial, single-storeyed masonry residence located in Main Street, Kangaroo Point, on a sloping block overlooking the Brisbane River and the Brisbane central business district. While the property does not extend to the riverbank, the house behind is at a much lower level and the land on the river bank below is now part of a Brisbane City Council-owned public park, hence the views of the city have not been built out. Immediately adjacent to Sunnyside on the south boundary is the heritage-listed Silverwells.

The house is of face brick work, but only the north side wall remains unpainted. It has a rectangular core with a projecting gable with a decorative bay window in the front (eastern) elevation. There is a verandah across the remainder of the front facade and returning along the south side of the house. The verandah posts, aluminium "lace" valances, and tiled concrete verandah floors, are much later than the core. There is a formerly detached brick kitchen house at the rear, with a brick croft or cellar below, where the land slopes to the river. Also at the rear, opening off both the kitchen house and the core, is a large timber pavilion dating probably to the 1910s or 1920s, and since enclosed. The core, kitchen house and pavilion roof each has a separate, hipped roof of corrugated iron. The whole, including the timber extension, rests on brick piers.

The interior has plastered masonry walls; high ceilings with decorative pressed metal panelling; well-detailed joinery (all now painted); and timber flooring (coated with a polyurethane finish). Many of the walls have been wallpapered (much appears to date from the 1960s or 1970s) and in some rooms paint has been applied over the wallpaper.

The interior is that of a solid middle-class rental property, well-detailed, nicely finished, with generously sized rooms and high ceilings, but without the ornate entrance vestibule common to more flamboyant owner-occupier, late 19th century residences. The front door opens directly into the main hallway, which runs east-west, off which are the former front parlour and dining room to the right. These rooms do not open into each other, but have back-to-back fireplaces which share a double chimney. The parlour has an early grey marble fireplace surround, but that in the dining room is a later and unsympathetic brick surround. A door in the rear (west) wall of the dining room opens onto a service passageway which leads to the kitchen house at the rear, and off which, to the right, are a small china pantry adjacent to the dining room, and a maid's room beyond this. The service passageway, which also runs east-west, leads to the now enclosed verandah which ran east-west beside the detached kitchen house. It is not clear whether a rear verandah initially ran the width (north-south) of the main building, but there is evidence of a former verandah between the maid's room in the core and the kitchen. This space has been enclosed as a bathroom; it has weatherboards externally on the north side and a c. 1960s interior.

Off the main hallway to the left are two bedrooms, but the doorways which once would have led from the hall into each bedroom have been bricked in and plastered (probably during the c. 1960 conversion to two flats), and there is no longer any evidence in the skirting boards of where these doorways were located. At its western end the main hallway opens into a cross-passage which leads on the right to the service passage and on the left originally to a bedroom door - this also has been bricked-in and plastered.

In-filling the L-shape formed by the main building and the kitchen house is one large room which appears to have been a former semi-open pavilion. This extension is clad externally with wide weatherboards to sill height. Above the sill the weatherboards are narrower and likely to be later in-fill, and in this are several aluminium-framed windows which are understood to have replaced earlier casements. The narrow hardwood floorboards of this room are arranged in a pattern which reputedly mirrored the original lattice ceiling above, extant but now covered with a recent plaster ceiling. Opening into this room is an external entrance accessed from the south side verandah.

The southern side of the house, the original bedroom wing, shows the greatest evidence of the c. 1960 alterations to form two flats. Access to the southern flat is now via the side entrance into the rear pavilion room. The third bedroom, formerly at the rear of the house, has been partitioned to form a bathroom, toilet and passageway leading from the pavilion room to the two front bedrooms, which are connected via an original doorway. In other words, the front bedroom can now only be accessed by passing through the second bedroom. The front bedroom has two step-out or telescopic windows opening onto the front verandah, and the second bedroom has a double sliding glass door of c. 1960 vintage opening onto the southern verandah, in the place of a former window. The single window to the third bedroom has been replaced by small, high windows to the bathroom and toilet. Another room, possibly a small fourth bedroom or servant's bedroom at the rear of the main building, has been converted into a kitchen. The wall between this room and the pavilion room (which currently functions as a combined dining and living room) has been almost totally removed, and it is no longer clear whether this room was accessed originally from a rear verandah, or from the cross or service passages in the middle of the house.

Attached to the kitchen house at the rear is a single-storeyed, skillion-roofed extension with a brick north wall, but open on the south side. Beside this is a larger skillion-roofed, weatherboard-clad double garage, again, open on the south side. Both these structures have concrete flooring. A concreted driveway leads from the street along the southern side of the property to the garages at the rear.

The front garden has an early path layout (extant by 1923) but c. 1970s planting and garden elements, including a stone water fountain, stone-edged garden beds, concrete blockwork front fence, and perimeter bamboo planting which acts as a screen to Main Street and to neighbouring properties.

== Heritage listing ==
Sunnyside was listed on the Queensland Heritage Register on 28 July 2000 having satisfied the following criteria.

The place is important in demonstrating the evolution or pattern of Queensland's history.

Sunnyside, Kangaroo Point, is important in illustrating the pattern of development of Kangaroo Point, Brisbane's first suburb, which from the 1850s attracted middle class residents who erected substantial homes overlooking the Brisbane River. The construction of Sunnyside in the 1890s illustrates the continued attraction of this quiet but centrally located suburb for the middle classes - a trend which was sustained into the 1920s. It is important also in illustrating the role of southern capital in developing Queensland from an early period. The place also has historical and social significance as the Chilean Consulate in Brisbane during the second half of the 20th century.

The place demonstrates rare, uncommon or endangered aspects of Queensland's cultural heritage.

The place is significant as a rare, late 19th century, single-storeyed brick residence in Brisbane, of a design and materials more commonly found in Sydney at this period. The place also is now rare as one of few 19th century residences surviving in Kangaroo Point, which has undergone enormous change since the construction of the Story Bridge and viaduct in the 1930s, the expansion of the shipbuilding industry on the point from the 1940s to the 1960s, and rapid and substantial residential re-development since the 1980s. Sunnyside and an adjacent 1860s brick duplex Silverwells are the last remaining 19th century residences in the block between Bright and Scott Streets, and together with the nearby Story Bridge Hotel (erected c. 1885) make an important historical contribution to the character of Kangaroo Point.

The place is important in demonstrating the principal characteristics of a particular class of cultural places.

Sunnyside is a substantial, well-detailed, late 19th century brick residence with aesthetic appeal, and is important in illustrating the principal characteristics of its type.

The place is important because of its aesthetic significance.

Sunnyside is a substantial, well-detailed, late 19th century brick residence with aesthetic appeal, and is important in illustrating the principal characteristics of its type. Although the house, behind its garden screen of trees and bamboo, is scarcely visible from the street, the grounds, along with adjacent mature trees, make an important aesthetic contribution to Main Street.

The place has a strong or special association with a particular community or cultural group for social, cultural or spiritual reasons.

The place also has historical and social significance as the Chilean Consulate in Brisbane during the second half of the 20th century.
