= Lamb House, Kangaroo Point =

Lamb House
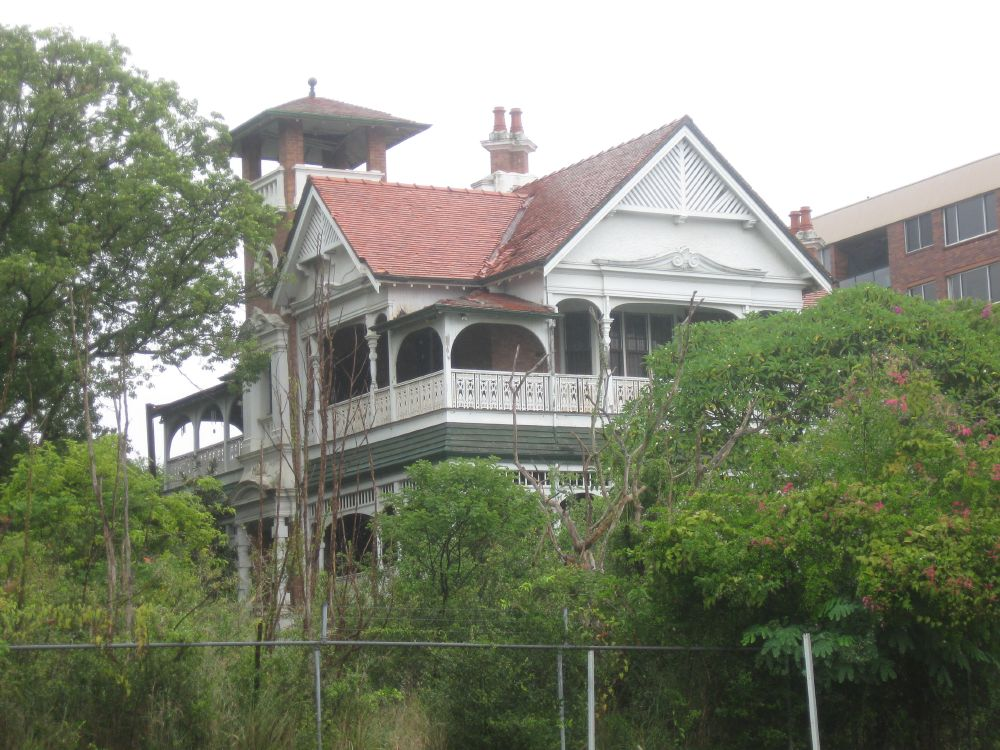
- Lamb House, from lower on the Kangaroo Point Cliffs

- Location within Queensland Location within Australia
- 27.4824°S 153.0323°E
- Location: 9 Leopard Street, Kangaroo Point, Queensland, Australia

History
- Design period: 1900–1914 (early 20th century)
- Built: c. 1902–c. 1908
- Built for: John Lamb

Site notes
- Architect: Alexander Brown Wilson
- Architectural style: Federation Filigree
- Owner: Steve and Jane Wilson

Queensland Heritage Register
- Official name: Home, Lamb House
- Type: state heritage (built, landscape)
- Designated: 21 October 1992
- Reference no.: 600242
- Significant period: 1900s (fabric, historical)
- Significant components: fence/wall – perimeter, views from, trees/plantings, residential accommodation – main house, garden/grounds, views to, tower – observation/lookout, gate – entrance
- Builders: W Anthony

Lamb House is a heritage-listed villa at 9 Leopard Street, Kangaroo Point, Queensland, Australia. It was designed by Alexander Brown Wilson and built from c. 1902 to c. 1908. It was added to the Queensland Heritage Register on 21 October 1992.

== History ==
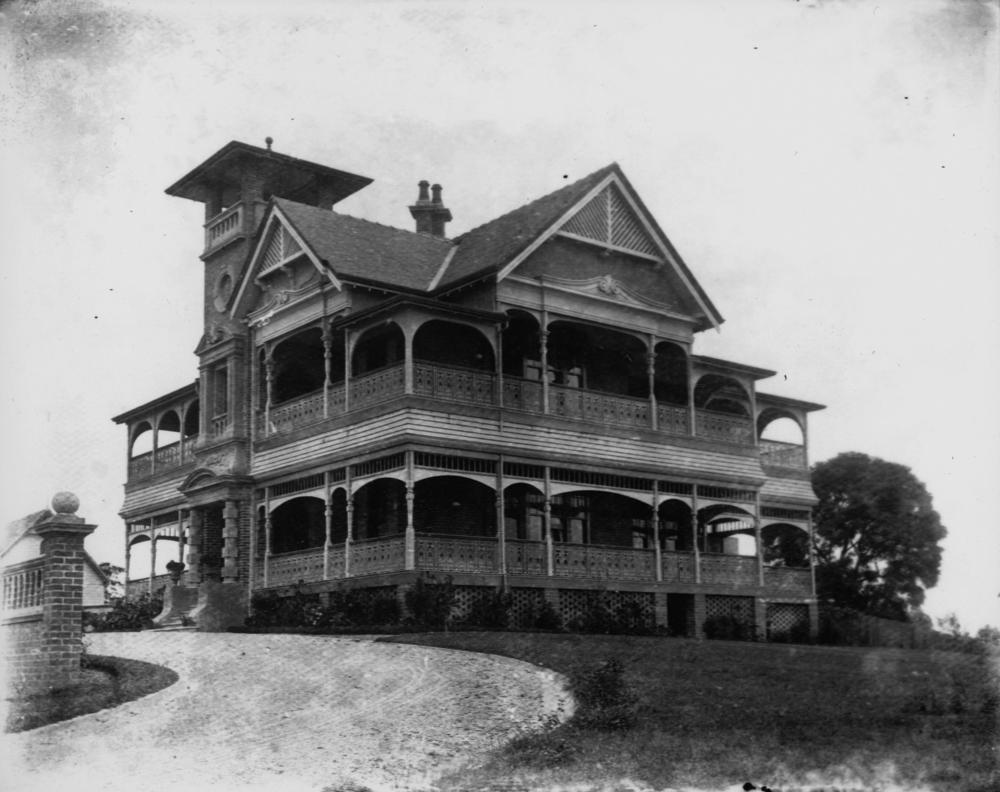
Lamb House, circa 1904

This substantial, two-storeyed brick residence was erected c. 1901 for John Lamb (the build plaque on the house has the year), co-proprietor of the successful Queen Street drapery establishment of Edwards & Lamb, and a businessman with enlightened attitudes toward his employees.

The house was designed by established Brisbane architect Alexander Brown Wilson and was constructed over a twelve-month period by builder W Anthony at a contract price of £3,250.

Kangaroo Point was Brisbane's earliest suburb, dating from the 1840s. From at least the 1860s, the higher land at Kangaroo Point attracted middle class residents who erected substantial homes overlooking the Brisbane River. The construction of this house in the early 1900s illustrates the continued attraction of this quiet but centrally located suburb for the middle class - a trend which was sustained into the 1920s.

The house remained the property of the Lamb family, but had been unoccupied apart from squatters, and had fallen into disrepair so severe its survival was threatened.

In December 2020 the Brisbane City Council declared its intention to sell the property to recover several years of unpaid rates, and by May 2021 the property was on the market, against the owners wishes. Development of the property is not allowed under a Temporary Local Planning Instrument placed by the local council.

In June 2021 the house was sold to the chairman of Racing Queensland, Steve Wilson, and his wife Jane. Driven by what Steve Wilson called "a sense of civic responsibility", the Wilsons invested three years and $15 million undertaking what has been acclaimed as a model restoration of the property. A team of specialist craftspeople worked under the supervision of renowned architecture firms James Davidson Architects and Conrad Gargett.

== Description ==
Lamb House is a large, two-storeyed, red brick residence with a multi-gabled roof clad in terracotta tiles. Conspicuously situated above the Kangaroo Point Cliffs at the southern end of the suburb, overlooking the South Brisbane and Town reaches of the Brisbane River, The house is an inner city landmark, prominent from many parts of the Brisbane central business district, the river and the Captain Cook Bridge and Pacific Motorway.

Queen Anne influences are evident in the timber and roughcast gable infill designs, the ornate cement mouldings to the entrance portico- cum-observation tower, and the elaborate chimney stacks and tall terracotta chimney pots.

Floor plans provided in the May 2021 ad for sale specify that the ceilings in Lamb House are 4 m (13 ft 1 in) on the ground floor and 3.65 m (12 ft 0 in) on the upper floor.

Verandahs on three sides at both levels have timber posts, arches and weatherboard friezes.

The original plans indicate vestibule and stairwell, dining, drawing and morning rooms, kitchen and service areas on the ground floor, and six bedrooms and a bathroom on the first floor.

The residence has substantial grounds with mature trees and gardens. Wrought iron entrance gates and the decorative masonry fence to Leopard Street are original.

Externally the building has an intact Federation architecture period facade, situated in a prominent riverside and garden setting.

== Heritage listing ==
Home was listed on the Queensland Heritage Register on 21 October 1992 having satisfied the following criteria.

The place is important in demonstrating the evolution or pattern of Queensland's history.

Its construction illustrates the sustained development of Kangaroo Point as a residential suburb from the 1840s, and in particular the continued appeal to middle class residents of the high land overlooking the Brisbane River at Kangaroo Point, contributing to our understanding of residential and social hierarchies in Brisbane, and of the role of the Brisbane River within this structure.

The place demonstrates rare, uncommon or endangered aspects of Queensland's cultural heritage.

Lamb House, erected c. 1902, is a rare surviving example of a grand, intact Federation period residence in the Brisbane district.

The place is important in demonstrating the principal characteristics of a particular class of cultural places.

Lamb House is a most accomplished building in its architectural design, materials, workmanship and setting, and is significant as a major example of the domestic work of notable Brisbane architect Alexander B Wilson.

The place is important because of its aesthetic significance.

The prominently situated residence has landmark quality and makes a strong aesthetic contribution to the townscape along the Kangaroo Point cliffs. Significant also are the views from Lamb House of the Brisbane River and central business district, which appear to have influenced the siting and design of the house.

The place has a special association with the life or work of a particular person, group or organisation of importance in Queensland's history.

Lamb House is a most accomplished building in its architectural design, materials, workmanship and setting, and is significant as a major example of the domestic work of notable Brisbane architect Alexander B Wilson.
