= Yungaba Immigration Centre =

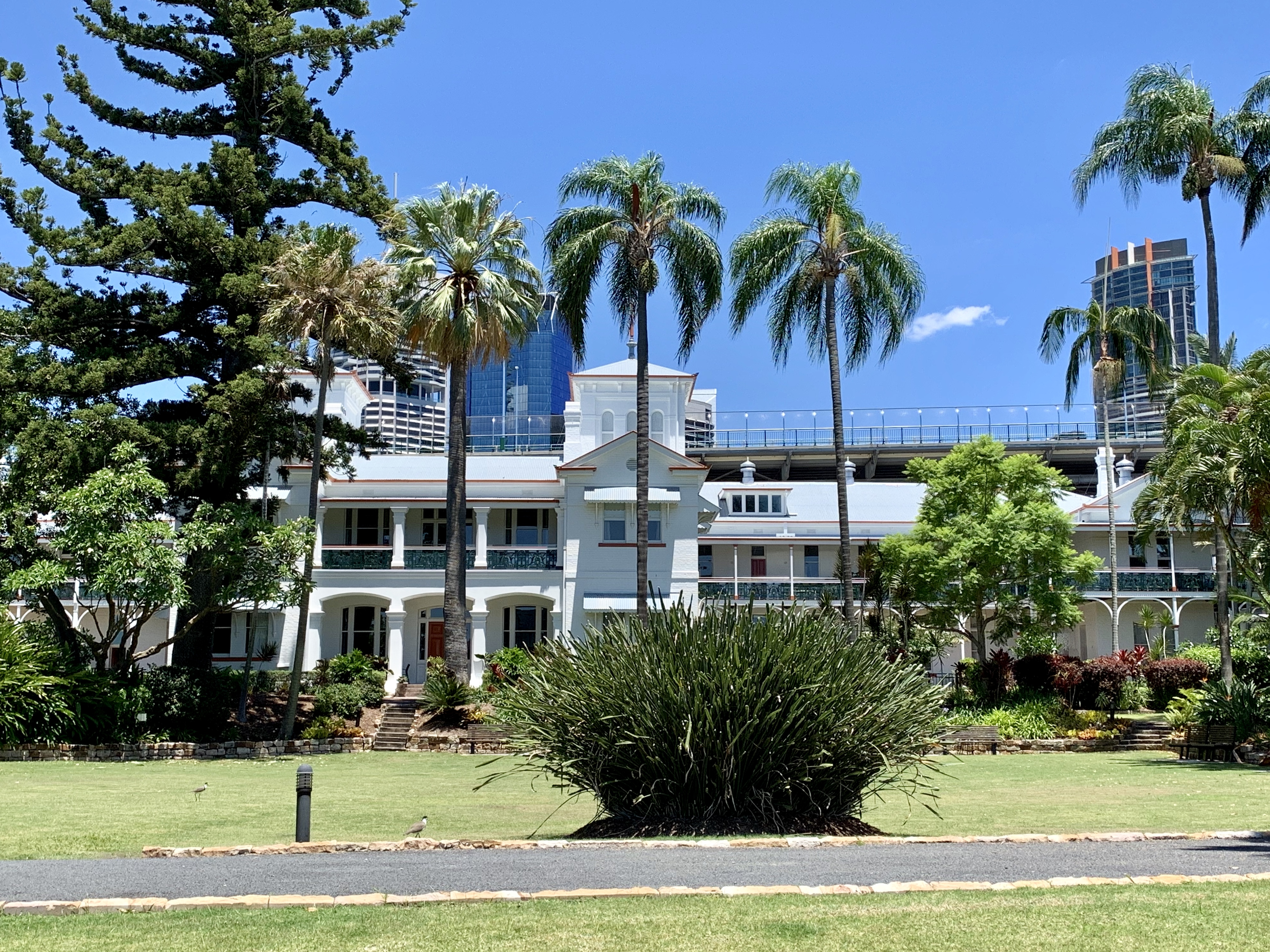
- Yungaba Immigration Centre, January 2019

- Location within Queensland
- 27.4671°S 153.0366°E
- Location: Yungaba, 102 Main Street, Kangaroo Point, City of Brisbane, Queensland, Australia

History
- Design period: 1870s–1890s (late 19th century)
- Built: c. 1885–1899

Site notes
- Architect: John James Clark
- Architectural style: Italianate

Queensland Heritage Register
- Official name: Yungaba Immigration Depot, Immigration Barracks, No.6 Australian General Hospital
- Type: state heritage (built)
- Designated: 21 October 1992
- Reference no.: 600245
- Significant period: 1880s (fabric); 1880s–1980s (historical)
- Significant components: trees/plantings, out building/s
- Builders: William Peter Clark

Yungaba Immigration Centre is a heritage-listed former immigration hostel at 102 Main Street, Kangaroo Point, City of Brisbane, Queensland, Australia, alongside the Brisbane River. It was designed by John James Clark and built c. 1885 by William Peter Clark. It is also known as Yungaba Immigration Depot, Immigration Barracks, and No.6 Australian General Hospital. It was added to the Queensland Heritage Register on 21 October 1992.

In 2009, as part of the Q150 celebrations, the Yungaba Immigration Centre was announced as one of the Q150 Icons of Queensland for its role as a "state shaper".

== History ==
Yungaba is a two-storey brick institutional building designed as an immigrant depot in 1885 by John James Clark, the Queensland Colonial Architect. Following his dismissal shortly after, the plan was developed by Edward Henry Alder and Robert Henry Mills. Constructed by William Peter Clark, the building is described as being of Italianate/Queensland/Institutional style.

Following the subdivision of Kangaroo Point in 1843–44, lots 21 and 22 were purchased by Judah and Isaac Solomon and Thomas Adams. Some time later, John "Tinker" Campbell, a neighbouring land-owner, purchased a share in both lots and transferred his boiling-down works to that location to gain the benefit of the small stream which crossed the properties. Following a series of financial transactions, the land was eventually purchased by Robert Douglas in 1853 for £400. Douglas constructed a house on lot 21 which he named "The Willows". Douglas was a prominent and popular person in Brisbane society at that time, although some scandal arose when it was revealed that he had sold his Kangaroo Point property to the government for £14,000 in 1884.

The government had been aware for some time that the immigration facilities at William Street were inadequate for their needs. The decision to acquire the land at Kangaroo Point was justified by the need to provide "pleasant surroundings" for those who were recently arrived in the colony. The pattern of immigration fluctuated wildly over the years and in the period immediately preceding the construction of the Kangaroo Point depot, immigration had been at an all-time high. William Peter Clark, the successful tenderer for the work, ran into a series of difficulties with the construction which resulted in almost a year's delay in the completion. The interior layout was designed by William Hodgen and arranged in a manner typical of institutional buildings of the time. Married quarters were in the form of separate cubicles on the ground level, and single quarters (segregated by gender, and in dormitory form) on the upper level. Symmetrical pairs of laundry and privy facilities were ranged to the rear of the building.

The first residents were passengers on the migrant ship Duke of Buccleuch who landed on 6 December 1887.

The first administrator was William Edward Parry-Okeden. Parry-Okeden was already a highly competent and practical man with a reputation for fair-dealing and vigorous commitment to his occupation. He and his family moved to Brisbane from Blackall to take up his appointment at the Immigration Depot. Later in life, he was to be appointed Under Colonial Secretary and to play an active role in both the management of Aborigines, the organisation of the Native Police and the resolution of the shearers' strikes in 1891 and 1894. Following the floods of 1887, Parry-Okeden and his wife refurbished "The Willows" which continued as their residence during his four years as immigration agent.

From the outset, Parry Okeden saw that a number of critical issues needed to be addressed before the depot could operate efficiently. Problems dogged the project throughout its early years. From the start, difficulties were experienced due to poor drainage resulting from the re-direction of the natural drainage into a stormwater drain. Subsequent drainage works had varying degrees of success, but the building soon showed signs of rising damp which was exacerbated by the poor quality bricks used during construction. Gas and water connections were either very basic or completely absent from vital parts of the building, there was no wharf facility at which to disembark the immigrants and, once landed, there was no facility for isolating those suspected of suffering contagious disease.

For a long time, it was argued that the damp problem was a result of rain beating on the sides of the building, rather than due to poor site drainage. In 1891 the verandahs on the eastern end of the northern side of the building were extended to shelter the walls from the rain. A matching verandah extension at the western end was not constructed until 1899 as the expense was considered too great when the source of the damp had not been proven. The later extension was made to regain the symmetry of the facade, rather than as a means of protecting the walls from the rain.

Wharf facilities were provided at the river bank in 1887 with a large luggage shed on the river bank. Parry-Okeden pointed out that the design was less than practical since a wide gap had been left between the two structures. At high tide, the wharf was cut off from land by a twelve-foot expanse of water. At low water, the wharf was inaccessible from the river due to the shallow water at this point. Repeated requests were necessary before the problems were rectified.

An outbreak of scarlet fever in 1889 lent urgency to the already noted need for isolation wards in which to treat sick immigrants. The same year a facility was constructed, but, due to an oversight in the plans, it had no facilities for the provision of gas or water or for the disposal of waste and storm water. Similar problems dogged the long-awaited "disinfecting plant" which was first vandalised and later inundated due to faulty drainage.

When immigration levels were low, the building was used for a variety of purposes. In 1900, it served as temporary accommodation for the inmates of the Dunwich Asylum which had been appropriated as an isolation ward for plague victims. In 1904–1906 it was again appropriated as accommodation for South Sea Islanders being repatriated under the new Commonwealth laws. The arrival of an immigrant ship led to the re-location of the Islanders to rented accommodation nearby, as it was considered inappropriate to expect the "two races" to co-habit.

The outbreak of World War I led to another change in use, the building being requisitioned for use as a military hospital. Few alterations to the fabric occurred as a consequence, although two single-storey wards were constructed to the southeast of the building. At the end of the war, the building provided an ideal reception area for returning servicemen who, with their wives, were feted at public receptions. Most of the building activity associated with this phase was removed at the end of the war.

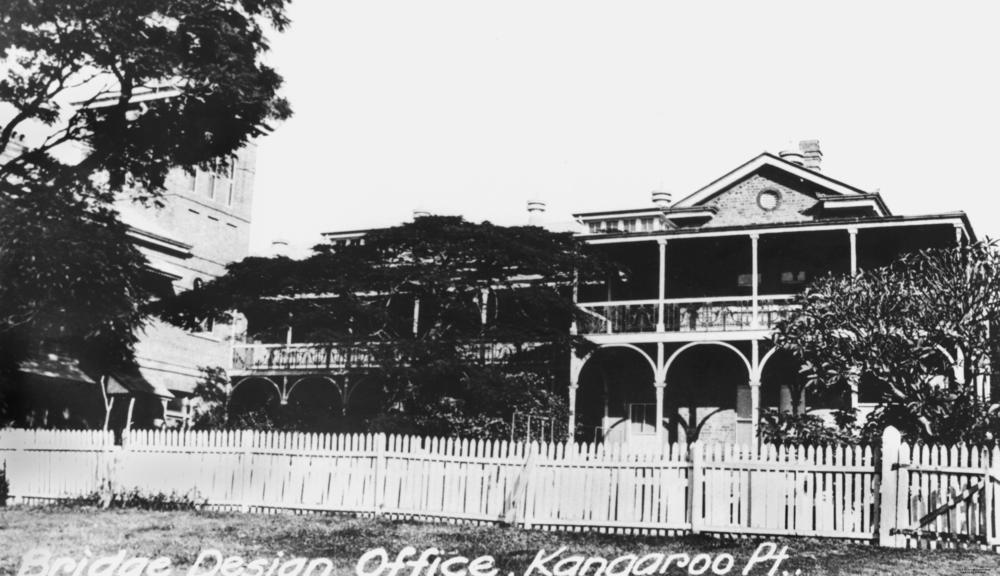
Story Bridge design office housed at the Immigration Depot building, 1938

From the end of World War I and throughout the 1920s, immigration swelled. The Great Depression of the 1930s led to a rapid fall in numbers, exacerbated by the cancellation of the assisted passage schemes. In 1938, the assistance scheme was reinstated and numbers rapidly climbed, only to fall again with the commencement of World War II.

During the period of inactivity in the 1930s, the building was used to house the team working on the construction of the Story Bridge. Accommodation for the superintendent of works, John Bradfield, was provided in the eastern room on the ground floor of the north wing. The entire upper floor of the north wing was devoted to offices and drafting rooms for the works in progress. Four dormer windows were inserted into the roof of the North wing dormitory to provide additional light for the draftsmen. The team for the concurrent Stanley River Dam project were relegated to a large room on the lower floor

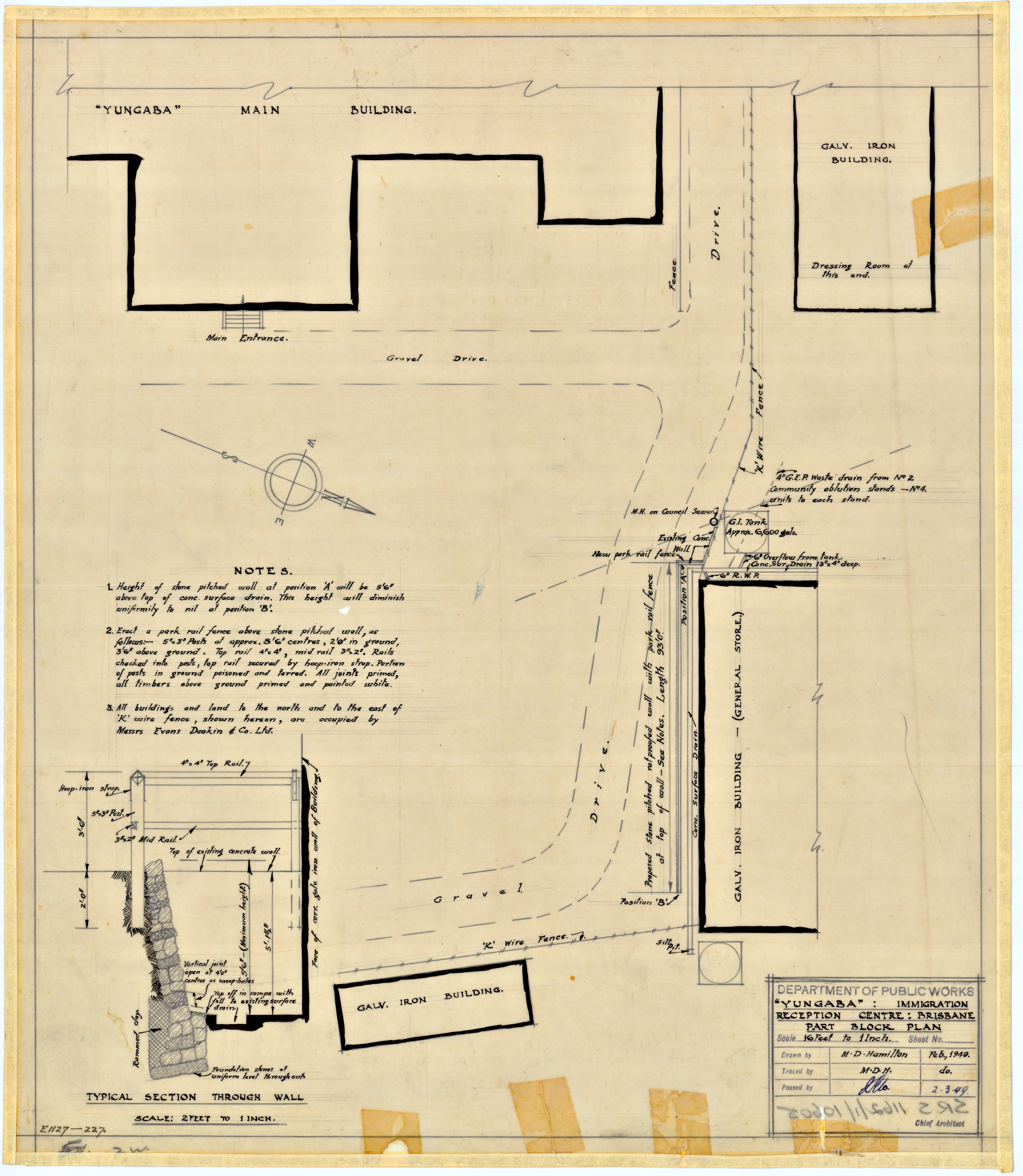
Part Block Plan, 1949

The bridge construction was undertaken by Evans Deakin, who converted the immigration depot's grounds into an industrial site with workshops and storehouses. A row of three open sheds cut off the connection between the hostel and the river, remaining in place until some time after the works were completed. The bridge is carried on tall stone pylons across the site to the rear of the principal building. The danger from falling debris and intentionally thrown objects has resulted in the need to identify an easement across the property on which no buildings can be constructed.

With the commencement of WWII the hostel was used to accommodated a hundred women and children evacuated from Hong Kong in 1940. In 1941 the depot was once again converted into a hospital, treating general patients. In 1942 it was devoted to "special" cases - those soldiers suffering the effects of venereal diseases. The buildings along the river frontage continued to be occupied by Evans Deakin; however, most of the other structures on the site were used for the treatment of patients. Most of these buildings are now demolished.

The post-war immigration boom led to a renewed life for the building, which was now named Yungaba State Immigration Office and Reception Centre. The name "Yungaba" derives from the Gubbi Gubbi Aboriginal language from the Maroochy area and means "place of sunshine". The volume of post-war immigration was such that the hostel was unable to cope with more than a small proportion of new arrivals, and the bulk were re-directed to the many empty military camps around the city. Of these, Camp Columbia at Wacol was perhaps the best known.

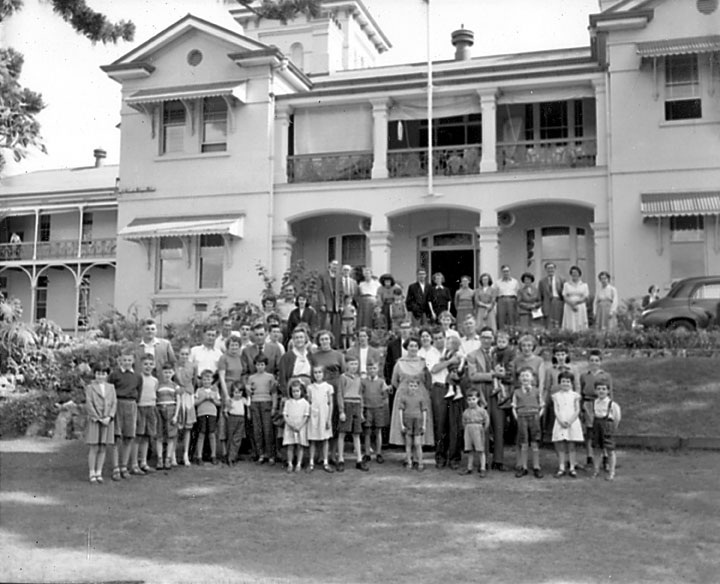
Migrant group on the lawn at Yungaba, 24 June 1958

This period saw what were probably the most extensive alterations to the building that have occurred to date. Cubicles were provided in the downstairs dormitories, toilet facilities were re-modelled or re-built, the kitchen was enlarged and refurbished and the exterior brickwork was limewashed. In the period since, the building has been subjected to various minor intrusions and alterations, with the removal of the verandahs and their reconstruction in 1990 being a major impact on the original fabric. Poor management and an inadequate maintenance program have contributed to loss of fabric, and the various internal subdivisions have had a negative impact on the effectiveness of the internal ventilation designed into the building by William Hodgen. In 1993, the building was refitted to provide office accommodation for the Department of Family Services. This refit involved the demolition of the partitions in the North wing. The access to the river was regained following the demolition of the sheds occupied by Evans Deakin and the new accommodation facilities erected in the 1970s respected this important axis.

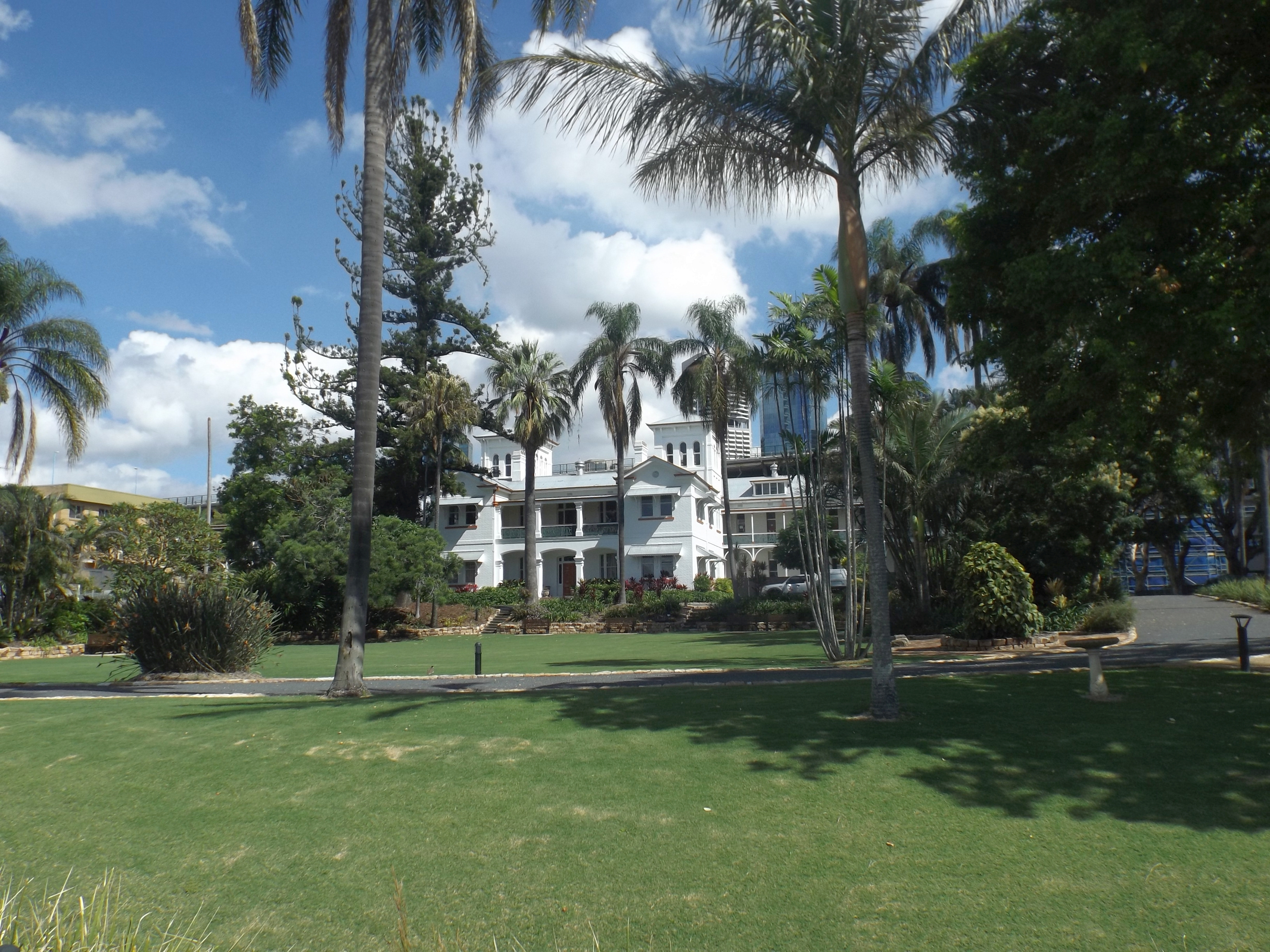
View from riverside to Yungaba, 2015

In 1988, Yungaba became the first building to entered on the Queensland Estate Register maintained under the Cultural Record (Landscapes Queensland and Queensland Estate) Act 1987. The entry was a result of community concern over the impact of the re-development of Kangaroo Point and the need to conserve significant elements of the community's heritage.

The use of Yungaba for immigration was phased out from 1993 and had ceased by 1995.

In 2008, the Queensland Government sold Yungaba to developers. The developers, Australand, have restored the fabric of the building and then converted it into ten apartments, constructed another 140 apartments in three adjacent apartment buildings, and built a multicultural centre and 224-seat auditorium. The new developments do not block the views from Yungaba to the river.

== Description ==
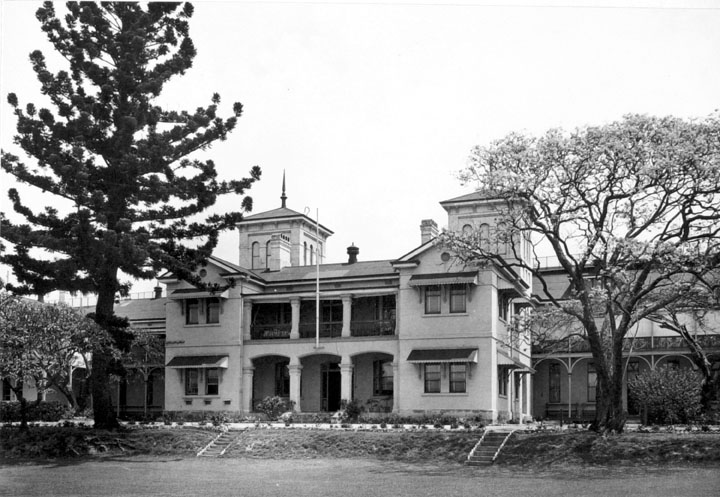
Yungaba, 1950

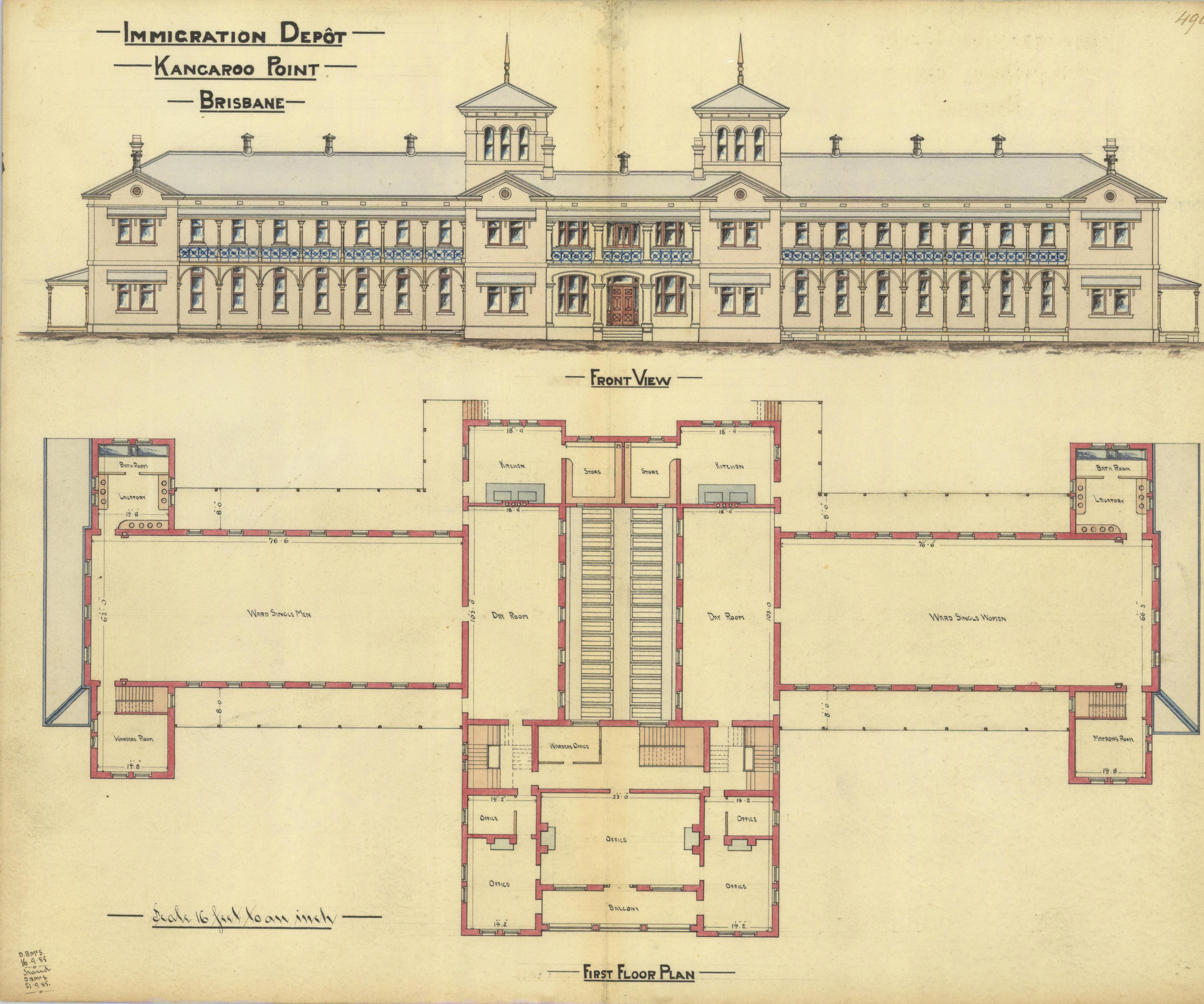
Architectural plans, 1885

Yungaba is located at Main Street, Kangaroo Point, Brisbane. Sited on the banks of the Brisbane River, adjacent to the Storey Bridge, the property holds a prominent position on Petrie Bight/Shafston Reach. The principal approach to the site is directed towards the river frontage, however the common access to the site is from Main Street. This point of landward entry passes through the rear of the site and reveals a collection of ancillary buildings associated with different uses the site has had through its history.

Yungaba is constructed as a symmetrical cruciform plan dominated by a substantial central entrance loggia which is flanked by two three-storey towers. These elements define the entry core of the building and the commencement of the two wings which extend to the north and south of the core. The building is a two-storey load-bearing brick structure with timber-framed floors and roof. The roof form consists of intersecting gable roof forms, punctuated by the pyramidal roofs of the two three-storey towers. The roof is clad with corrugated metal sheeting and includes a series of ornate metal ridge ventilators.

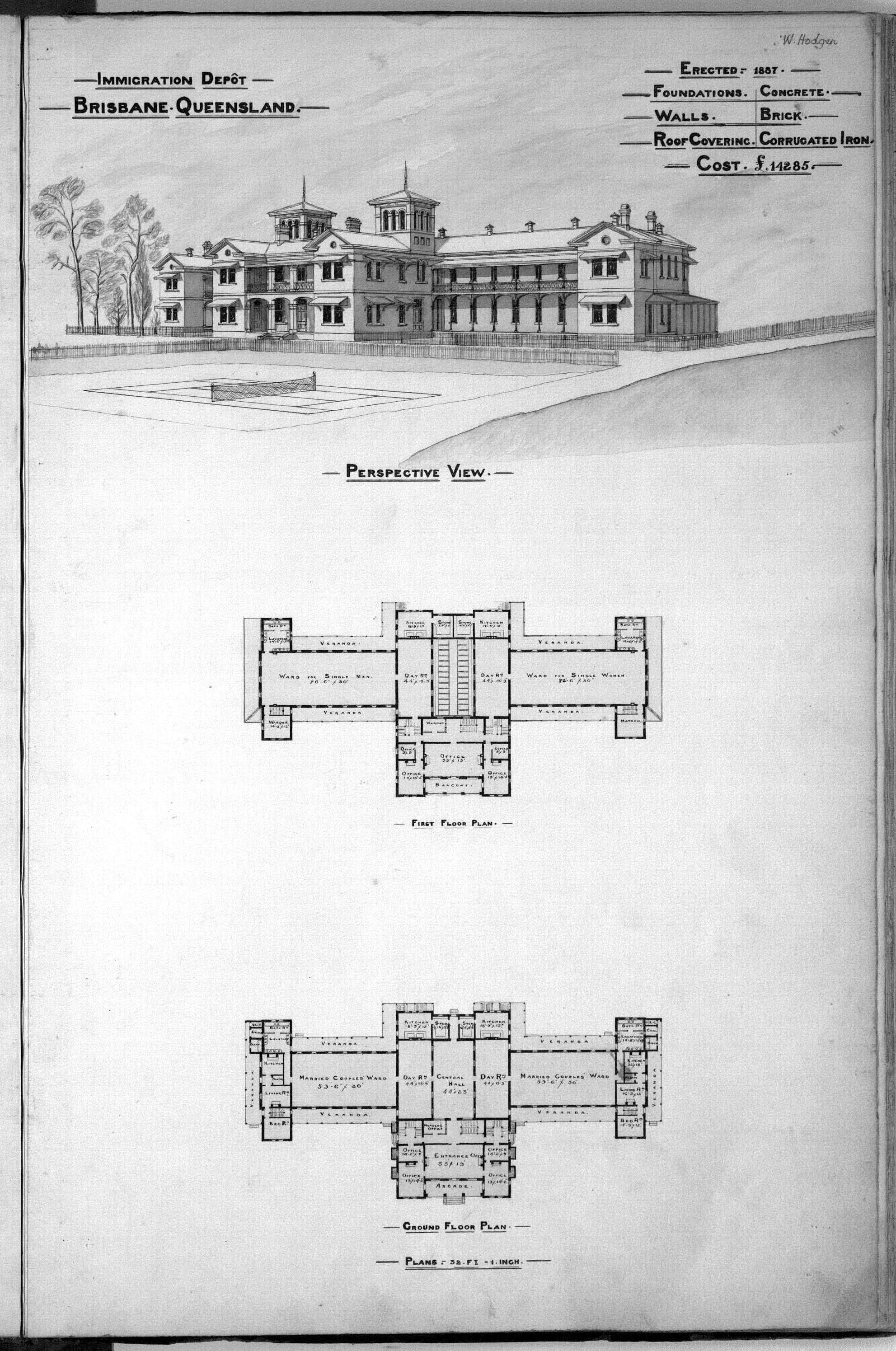
Architectural plans, 1888

Verandahs extend along the eastern and western elevations of the wings of the building. The verandahs have timber posts and handrails with decorative cast iron balustrade infill panels. The end sections of the verandahs are also enclosed with lattice screening. Beyond the line of the verandah, windows are sheltered under sunhoods constructed from cast iron wall brackets and timber hood framing, clad with metal sheeting.

Internally, the central core retains its original configuration, with rooms being used as personnel offices and meeting rooms associated with Public Works. In both the north and south wings of the building the once open plan interior spaces have been adapted to accommodate offices and function areas associated with a catering company and a collection of community groups. At ground level, these spaces have been divided into cellular rooms serviced by a central hall, while the upper level remains substantially open with office partitioning being concentrated toward the core of the building. The timber framed partitioning to these areas is clad with both hardboard and timber tongue-and-groove linings. These adaptive works are generally reversible, and much of the original fabric of the building remains intact.

The garden structure to the building appears to post date WWII. On the riverside of Yungaba a ring road sweeps past the entry to the building and out toward the river edge, returning to the point of entry at the northern end of the building. A collection of mature and more recent plantings line the ring road, with the central area being predominately grass. A more recent function room constructed of brick with a flat metal deck roof is located in the south-east corner of the site, fronting the river.

A bitumen car park set among a collection of ancillary buildings covers much of the area to the rear of the building. These structures are single storey and constructed of both brickwork and timber, with simple gable and hip roof forms. The roofs are clad with corrugated metal sheeting and some include timber louvred ridge ventilators.

A more recent accommodation facility is located across the access road to the north of Yungaba. This building is two storeys and constructed of brick with concrete floors and a flat metal deck roof. Essentially, the building is visually detached from Yungaba due to its lower level siting and line of mature trees which create a barrier between the two parts of the site.

== Heritage listing ==
Yungaba Immigration Depot was listed on the Queensland Heritage Register on 21 October 1992 having satisfied the following criteria.

The place is important in demonstrating the evolution or pattern of Queensland's history.

Yungaba is symbolic of the high priority that was placed on immigration during the late nineteenth century and the manner in which the colonial, and then State governments provided for those needs. The government's ambitious and extensive immigration programs established Queensland as the "immigration colony" of Australia with immigration levels higher than any other colony or state in the country.

The place is important in demonstrating the principal characteristics of a particular class of cultural places.

Yungaba is important in demonstrating the principal characteristics of a particular class of cultural place in that it clearly demonstrates the characteristics of institutional buildings of the late nineteenth century in its symmetrical layout and the hierarchy of decoration used to define the various functions of the place. The relatively unchanged quality of the original fabric provides information regarding the status and priority given to immigration during the period in which it was built.

Yungaba provides an example of the form of accommodation provided for newly arrived immigrants to Australia in the late nineteenth century. Its original layout, with gender- separated dormitory accommodation for singles, single-room accommodations for families and shared toilet facilities provides comment on the understanding of privacy, morality and human behaviour current at the time.

The place is important because of its aesthetic significance.

Yungaba is important in exhibiting particular aesthetic characteristics valued by the community or a particular group as it is a distinguished building located on the banks of the Brisbane River with clear views between the site and the river. Its elegant, yet restrained ornamentation softens the potential austerity of its symmetrical plan.

The place has a strong or special association with a particular community or cultural group for social, cultural or spiritual reasons.

Yungaba has a special association with a wide variety of communities and cultural groups for social and cultural reasons. It has been used to accommodate generations of immigrants, to welcome soldiers and their dependents on their return from three major conflicts, it has housed South Sea Islanders awaiting repatriation to their home islands under Commonwealth legislation, and it is closely associated with the construction of the Story Bridge, one of Brisbane's landmarks. Its listing as the first building to be protected under the Cultural Record (Landscapes Queensland and Queensland Estate) Act 1987 demonstrates is strong community value within the city of Brisbane.

The place has a special association with the life or work of a particular person, group or organisation of importance in Queensland's history.

Yungaba has a particular association with the works of J J Clark, Colonial Architect and William Parry Okeden, later Under Colonial Secretary, who was instrumental in the settlement of both the shearers' strikes and the problems with the Native Police. Parry-Okeden also had a significant role in the relationship between the colonial government and Aborigines due to his extensive knowledge of Aboriginal languages and dialects.

== See also ==
- Immigration to Australia
