= Kangaroo Point, Queensland =

Kangaroo Point
- Suburb
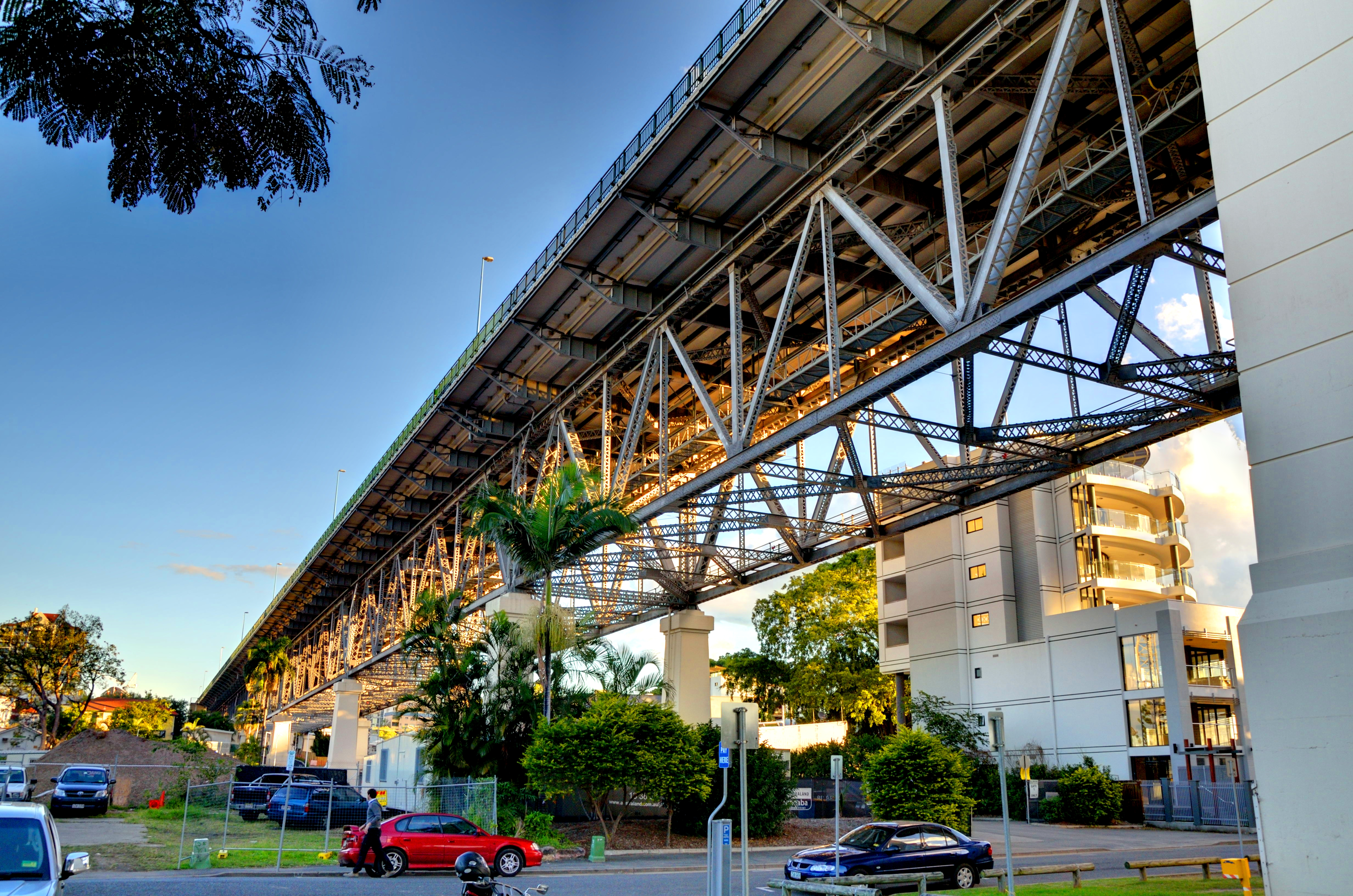
- Kangaroo Point, underneath the Story Bridge

- Interactive map of Kangaroo Point
- Coordinates: 27.4747°S 153.0386°E
- Country: Australia
- State: Queensland
- City: Brisbane
- LGA: City of Brisbane (The Gabba Ward)
- Location: 3.8 km (2.4 mi) SE of Brisbane CBD

Government
  - State electorate: South Brisbane
  - Federal division: Griffith

Area
  - Total: 1.8 km^{2} (0.69 sq mi)

Population
  - Total: 9,689 (2021 census)
  - Density: 5,380/km^{2} (13,900/sq mi)
- Time zone: UTC+10:00 (AEST)
- Postcode: 4169
Suburbs around Kangaroo Point
Brisbane CBD	Fortitude Valley	New Farm
Brisbane CBD	Kangaroo Point	New Farm
South Brisbane	Woolloongabba	East Brisbane

Kangaroo Point is an inner southern suburb in the City of Brisbane, Queensland, Australia. In the 2021 census, Kangaroo Point had a population of 9,689 people.

The suburb features two prominent attractions, the Story Bridge and Kangaroo Point Cliffs. At the western margins, the Captain Cook Bridge marks the start of the Pacific Motorway. The Kangaroo Point Green Bridge connects the suburb to the central business district.

== Geography ==
Kangaroo Point is located directly east across the Brisbane River from the Brisbane central business district, but being on the south side of the river is normally regarded as a southern suburb.

Kangaroo Point is located on a peninsula formed of harder rhyolite rock which the Brisbane River flows around. On the northern tip of the peninsula the Story Bridge connects it to the central business district and the suburb of Fortitude Valley. The suburb of Woolloongabba is located to the south. The six-lane Main Street runs from Story Bridge to Woolloongabba. The landscape of Kangaroo Point is predominantly high-rise apartments towards the tip of the peninsula while the southern end is predominantly low-medium density apartments and Queenslander type houses.

At the northern tip of the peninsula is Captain Burke Park (27.4653°S 153.0350°E) with the Holman Street ferry wharf (27.4658°S 153.034°E), barbeques, picnic facilities, playground, and outdoor fitness facilities.

== History ==
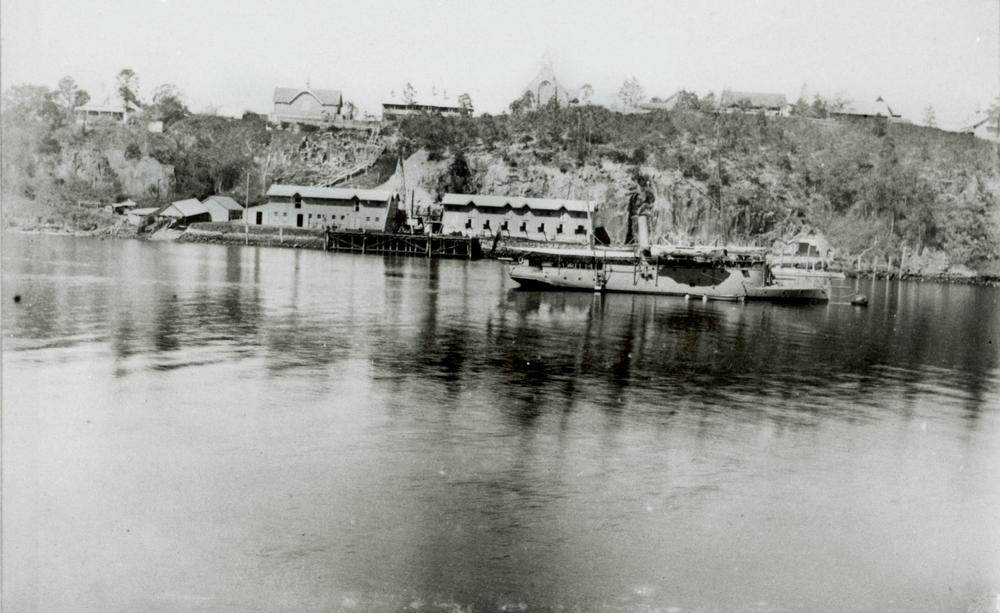
The Queensland Navy's main stores below the Kangaroo Point cliffs, with the gunship Paluma moored in the Brisbane River in the 1890s.

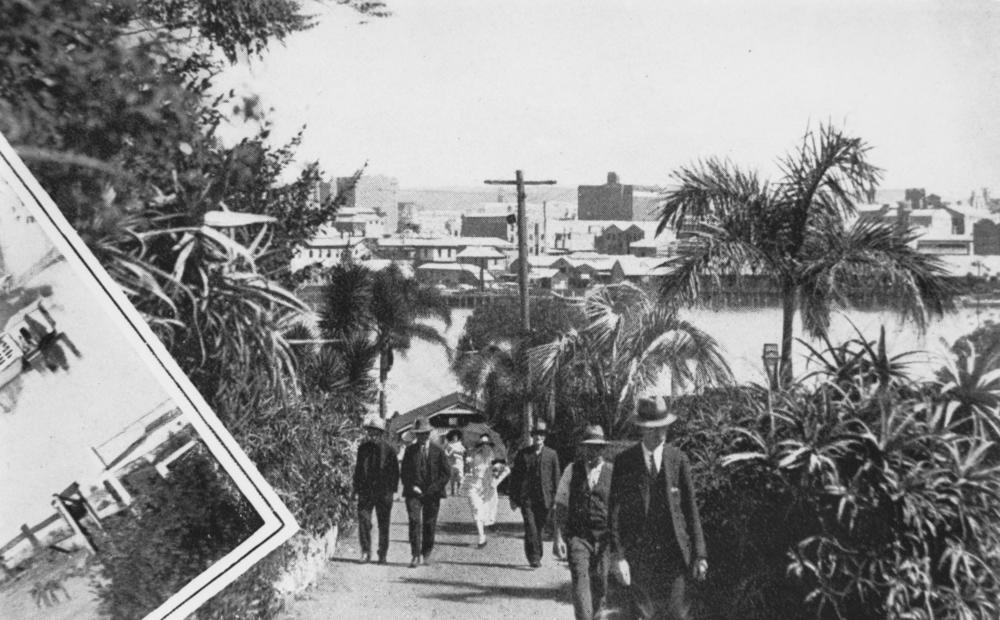
Kangaroo Point Ferry Terminal c. 1928

Before British settlement, Kangaroo Point was settled by the Turrbal people. It is one of the earliest suburbs settled in Brisbane and subsequently, is one of Brisbane's oldest suburbs, rich in history and character. It had a reputation for violent and rowdy street gangs around the 1900s, with a number of street riots.

In 1823, explorer John Oxley described Kangaroo Point as a "jungle, fringed with mangroves with the higher land open forest, covered with grass". During the time of the subsequent convict settlement (1825–1841), Kangaroo Point was cleared and used for cultivation of crops. Subsequently, the area was opened up for free settlement, the first land sales taking place on 13 December 1843. Among the early purchasers was Captain John Clements Wickham, the Police Magistrate and later Government Resident. Surveyor James Warner built the first house at Kangaroo Point in 1844.

Kangaroo Point's first school was opened in 1861 by the Church of England. It came under the control of the Board of Education in 1867 and consisted of a boys department and a girls department. A separate Girls and Infants school opened on 2 March 1874. This was replaced by the Kangaroo Point Girls School and the Kangaroo Point Infants School which both opened on 20 January 1890. The Kangaroo Point Boys School, Girls School and Infants School closed on 28 April 1950 and amalgamated to become the Kangaroo Point State School. The Kangaroo Point State School closed on 30 June 1965. The school was on the western side of Main Street and River Terrace (27.4753°S 153.0352°E). The site was subsequently redeveloped as a TAFE college, on the corner of River Terrace and Main Street. In January 2010 this site was redeveloped into parkland extending the Kangaroo Point Cliffs Park.

In September 1865, 42 allotments of portion 35 of Kangaroo Point were advertised to be auctioned for sale by Arthur Martin & Co. A map advertising the auction contained a diagram of subdivisions 1 to 31 situated between Ipswich Road and the Brisbane River.

St Joseph's Catholic Primary School was founded by Mary MacKillop and opened on 19 March 1870 in Hubert Street in One Mile Swamp (now Woolloongabba) with 70 students. In January 1871, the school relocated to Leopold Street (not Leopard Street) at Kangaroo Point into an unlined timber building with a shingle roof on land provided by James Toohey. In 1879 the Sisters of Mercy took over the operation of the school, following a dispute between MacKillop and the Catholic Bishop of Brisbane.

In 1887, the Yungaba Immigration Centre was built on Main Street at Kangaroo Point to replace the poor facilities at the existing centre in William Street.

In June 1888, six allotments, being subdivisions 1 to 6 of subdivisions 7 to 11 of portions 68 in the Parish of Kangaroo Point, on Walmsley Street between the Garden Point Ferry and Main Street were advertised to be auctioned for sale by Simon Fraser & Son. A map advertising the auction contained a local sketch by the surveyors, Hamilton & Raff.

In 1911–1912, St John's College of the University of Queensland opened in three Queenslander houses on River Terrace (27.4811°S 153.0334°E). At that time, the university was located at Gardens Point just across the Brisbane River. In 1956, the college relocated to the university's St Lucia campus.

In September 1928, 19 subdivisions adjacent to the Brisbane River and titled "Town Reach River Sites" were advertised to be auctioned for sale by Isles, Love & Co Limited. A map advertising the auction includes an aerial photograph and a panoramic photograph of the area.

For many years the suburb was dominated by the factories of heavy engineering businesses, particularly those involved in the maritime industry, such as Evans Deakin, Buzzacott & Co and Evans, Anderson, Phelan & Co. Evans Deakin built the largest ship ever constructed on the Brisbane River, the 66,000 tonne oil tanker Robert Miller, which became adrift in the river during the 1974 Brisbane flood. The last vessel to be built by Evans Deakin was an oil rig called Southern Cross. The company vacated the site in 1976, with it later being redeveloped for high-rise accommodation.

Stone was quarried from the cliffs and used as building material. Until the 1930s, Evans Anderson & Phelan built steam locomotives at their Kangaroo Point works for Queensland Railways, however their works were not located near a railway, so the completed locomotives were delivered along Main Street on temporary track.

Until the federation of the Australian colonies in 1901, the Queensland Navy's main storage facility was located in the suburb. The first ship-based radio transmission in Australia was made between HMAS Gayundah and the buildings in 1903. The naval stores buildings were occupied by the Royal Australian Navy until 1959, and then by the Australian Army until 1984. The heritage-listed buildings are now used by an adventure company focussing on river activities and rock climbing.

The opening of the Story Bridge (27.4693°S 153.0359°E) in July 1940 was a significant development in the suburb. Trolleybuses operated by the Brisbane City Council linked the suburb with Fortitude Valley via the Story Bridge from 1953 to 1969, running along Main Street from Woolloongabba and other eastern suburbs. At the time of the Story Bridge project, both the eastern and western riverfronts of Kangaroo Point were industrial areas and docks; these were gradually replaced by large residential developments and recreation space up to the 1980s.

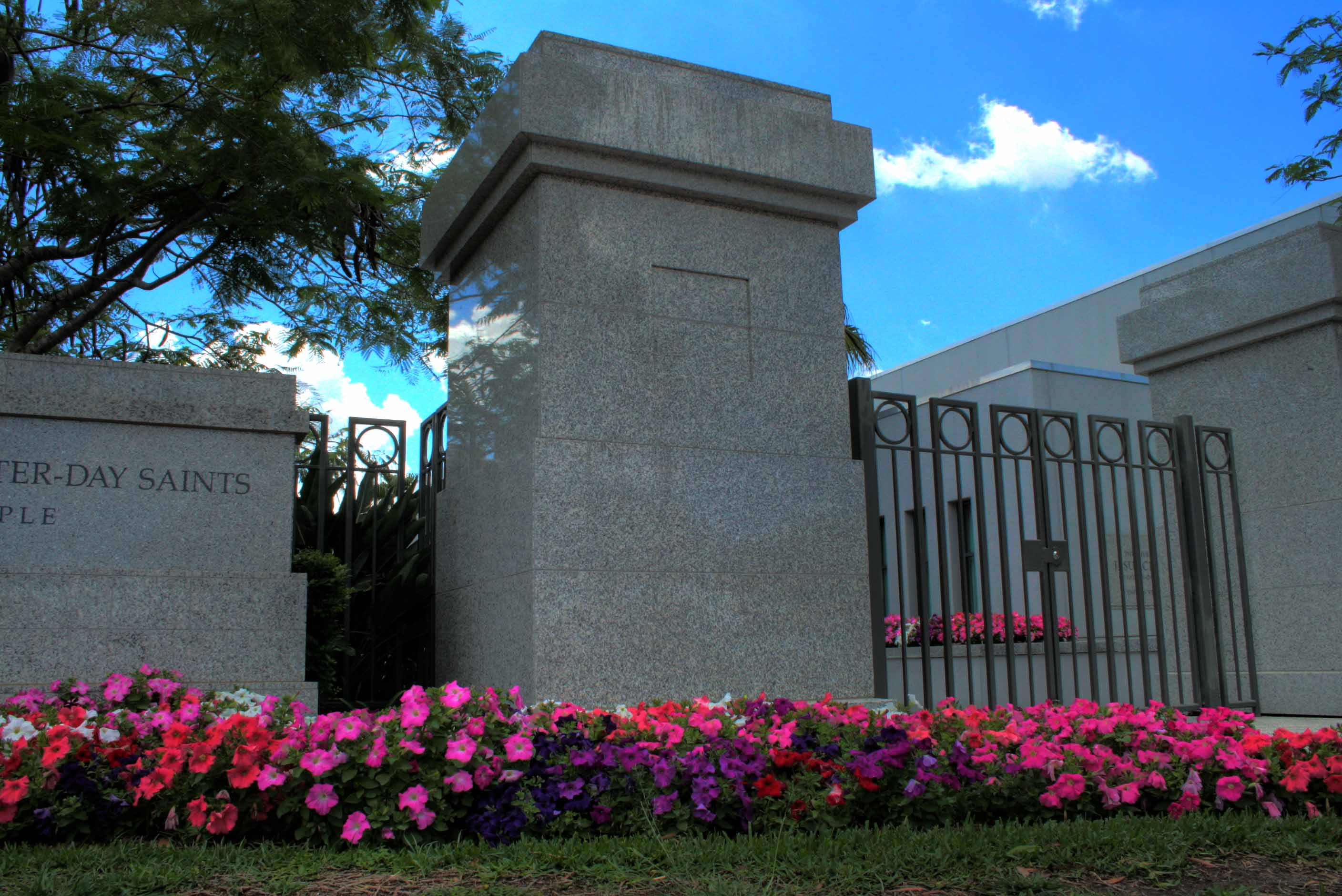
Entrance to Temple grounds

On 20 July 1998, the LDS Church announced that its Brisbane temple would be built in Kangaroo Point. There were delays due to negotiations with the Brisbane City Council over concerns about the temple's height, floodlighting and parking arrangements. On 26 May 2001, Kenneth Johnson presided at the groundbreaking ceremony and site dedication. Construction of the temple began in November 2001 and took 18 months. A public open house was held from 10 May through 7 June 2003 allowing local residents to view the temple prior to its dedication (after which it was open only to church members). The temple was dedicated on 15 June 2003 by LDS Church president Gordon B. Hinckley. The 10,700-square-foot (990 m^{2}) temple features two ordinance rooms and two sealing rooms.

Kangaroo Point was host to the Aboriginal Centre for the Performing Arts (ACPA), which later moved to the Judith Wright Arts Centre in Fortitude Valley). It was host to the Southbank Institute of TAFE campus until its demolition in 2009, now replaced by the Southbank Institute of Technology in neighbouring South Brisbane.

== Demographics ==
In the 2011 census, the population of Kangaroo Point was 7,000 people, in an area of 1.3 square kilometres. The population was 48.3% females and 51.7% males. The median age of the Kangaroo Point population was 35 years of age, 2 years below the Australian median. 53.1% of people living in Kangaroo Point were born in Australia, compared to the national average of 69.8%; the next most common countries of birth were New Zealand 5.2%, England 4.4%, India 1.6%, Ireland 1.6%, Taiwan 1.2%. 69.6% of people spoke only English at home; the next most popular languages were 1.9% Mandarin, 1.8% Spanish, 0.9% Cantonese, 0.9% Nepali, 0.9% Italian. It has one of the city's highest proportion of residents living in flats, units or apartments (78.8%). Residents in stand-alone houses make up only 16.6% of the population. 59.9% of residents are renters while 18.7% fully own their dwelling

In the 2016 census, Kangaroo Point had a population of 8,063 people.

In the 2021 census, Kangaroo Point had a population of 9,689 people.

== Attractions ==
Kangaroo Point is a popular recreation spot, conveniently close to the city and the South Bank Parklands. The Kangaroo Point Cliffs, situated on the east bank of the city bend of the Brisbane River north of the Maritime Museum, opposite Riverstage and the Queensland University of Technology at Gardens Point. Kangaroo Point is also home to one of less than 200 Mormon temples in the world {as of August 2015}. Kangaroo Point is also home to Ellis Street, one of the 20 steepest hills in Brisbane according to Brisbane City Council. Kangaroo Point is also home to the more-than-160-year-old St Mary's Anglican Church.

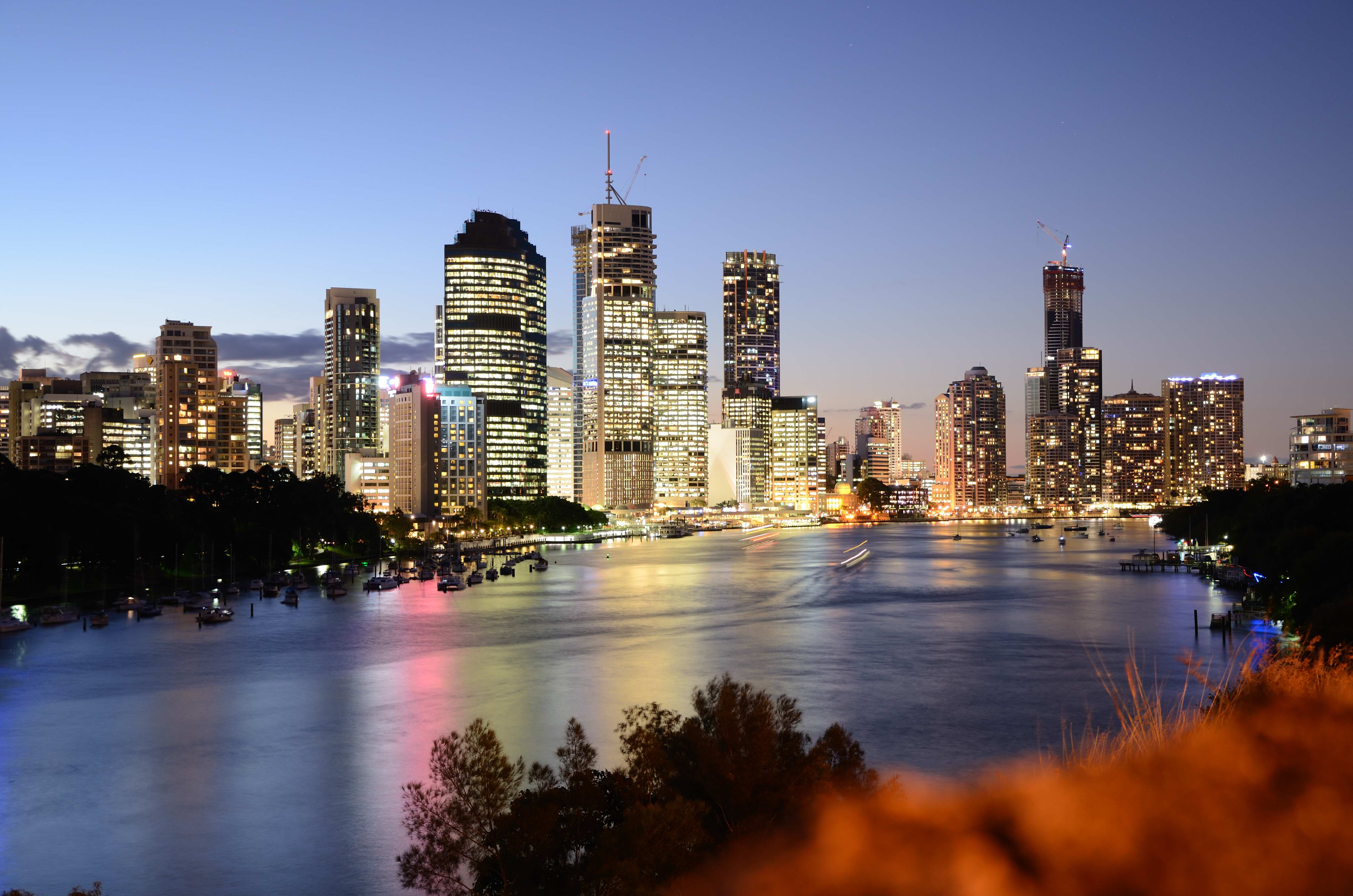
Brisbane's CBD from Kangaroo Point cliffs

The cliffs are a popular picnic, rock climbing and abseiling site. The steepness of the cliffs was increased by quarrying operations which mined the volcanic rock or rhyolite lava flows which form the cliffs. The lava was deposited in the Triassic Period about 230 million years ago and filled up an ancient river valley. They currently form the banks of the Brisbane River.

The Story Bridge is a prominent landmark. It is able to be climbed with authorised tourist groups and provides the main means of access to the north of Brisbane. Directly under the bridge is the Story Bridge Hotel, and Yungaba, one of Brisbane's most unusual and iconic landmarks.

The Kangaroo Point Natural History Project was implemented by the council in 2013 to recognise the contribution by some of Queensland's pioneering scientists and researchers from the area. Along a heritage trail through the CT White and James Warner parks are a series of signs and sculptures to commemorate their lives and work: Cyril Tenison White (government botanist), Frederick Manson Bailey (colonial botanist), Silvester Diggles (naturalist), Oscar Werner Tiegs (entomologist and zoologist), James Warner (surveyor), and Harry Oakman (landscape artist).

== Transport ==
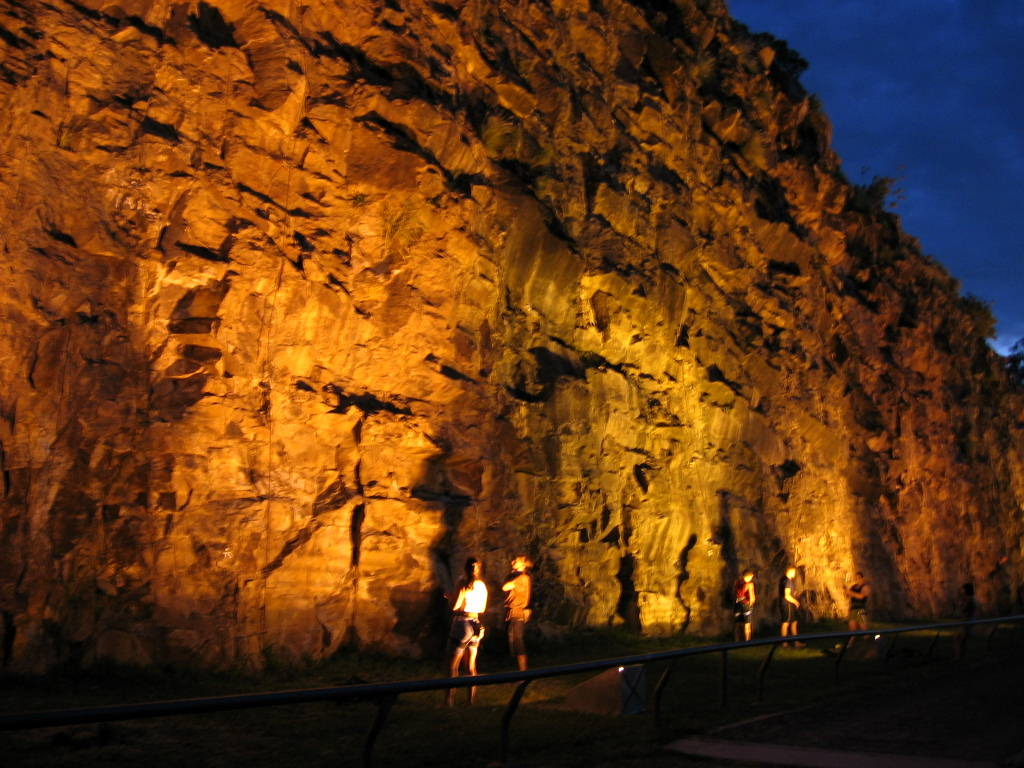
Kangaroo Point Cliffs after sunset

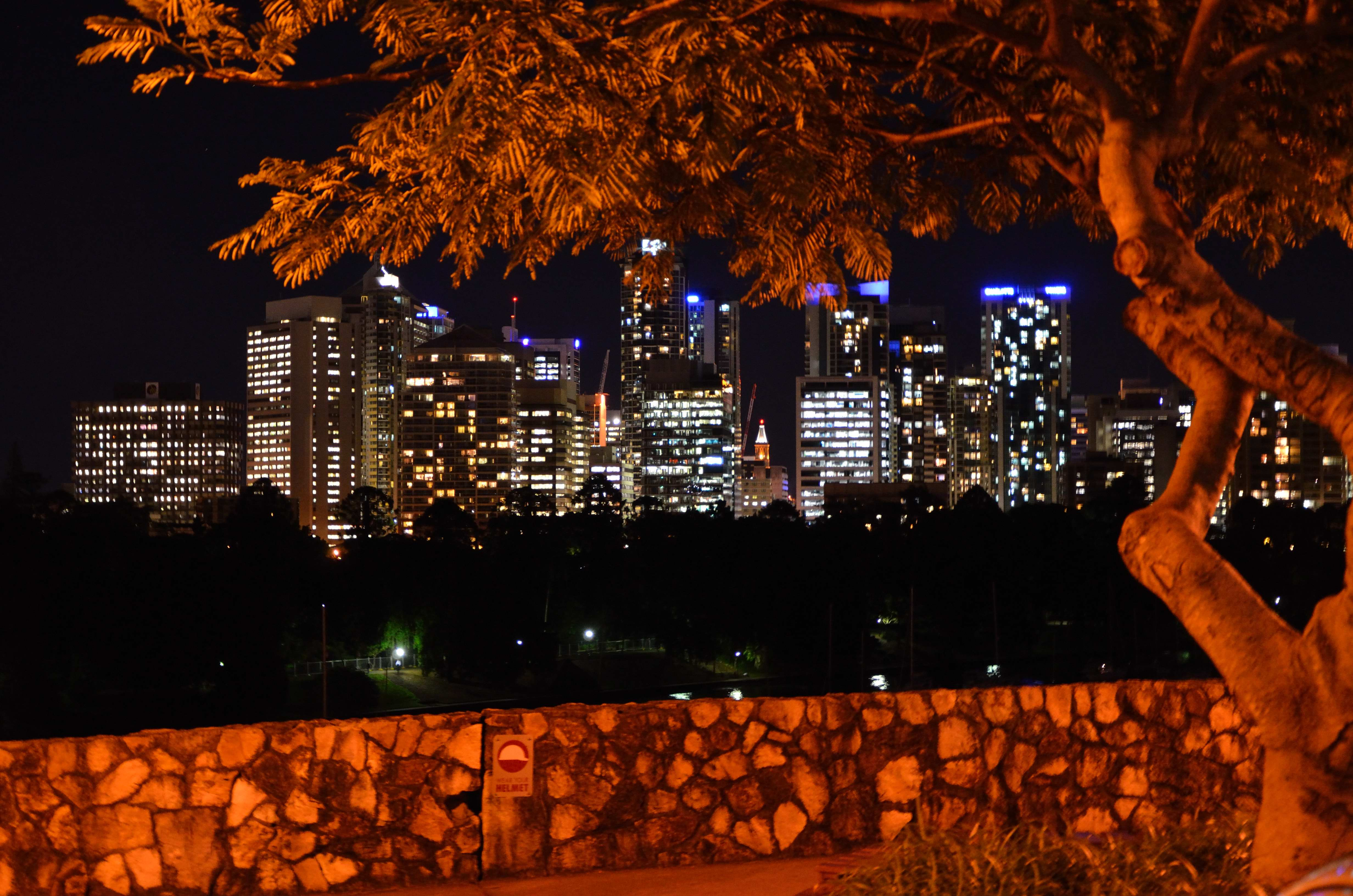
Walkway along the cliffs

By bus, the suburb is serviced by the South East Busway transit line and buses along Main Street and Shafstons Avenue. By road, Kangaroo Point residents rely on the Story Bridge and Captain Cook Bridge for access to the north, and the Southeast Freeway for access to the south. Main Street connects the Story Bridge through the suburb to the South East Freeway. Bicycle paths run along the Brisbane River from South Bank to and over the Story Bridge. The bicycle paths are heavily used by cyclists, roller skaters and pedestrians.

Cross River and CityHopper ferry services operate from the Riverside wharf in the CBD to Holman Street ferry wharf near the peak of Kangaroo Point. CityCat services do not directly service Kangaroo Point.

The Clem Jones Tunnel, a toll tunnel, which opened in March 2010, has a connection on Shafston Avenue. It diverts some traffic travelling through the suburb while providing an additional transport route for residents.

The Kangaroo Point Green Bridge was proposed in 2010 to connect Kangaroo Point to the Brisbane central business district. Construction of the bridge began in 2021. The Cross River Rail tunnel is planned to connect under the Kangaroo Point Cliffs from Woolloongabba railway station to Albert Street railway station.

== Education ==
St Joseph's Primary School is a Catholic primary (Prep–6) school for boys and girls at 26–36 Leopard Street (27.4829°S 153.0329°E). In 2017, the school had an enrolment of 318 students with 24 teachers (18 full-time equivalent) and 16 non-teaching staff (9 full-time equivalent).

There are no government schools in Kangaroo Point. The nearest government primary school is East Brisbane State School in East Brisbane. The nearest government secondary school is Coorparoo Secondary College in Coorparoo.

For tertiary studies, Kangaroo Point is host to Shafston International College and the Aboriginal Centre for the Performing Arts (ACPA) (which has now moved to the Judith Wright Arts Centre in Fortitude Valley) and was host to a Southbank Institute of TAFE campus until its demolition in 2009. Directly across the river from the cliffs is the Queensland University of Technology (Gardens Point campus) and the Southbank Institute of Technology is in neighbouring South Brisbane.

== Amenities ==
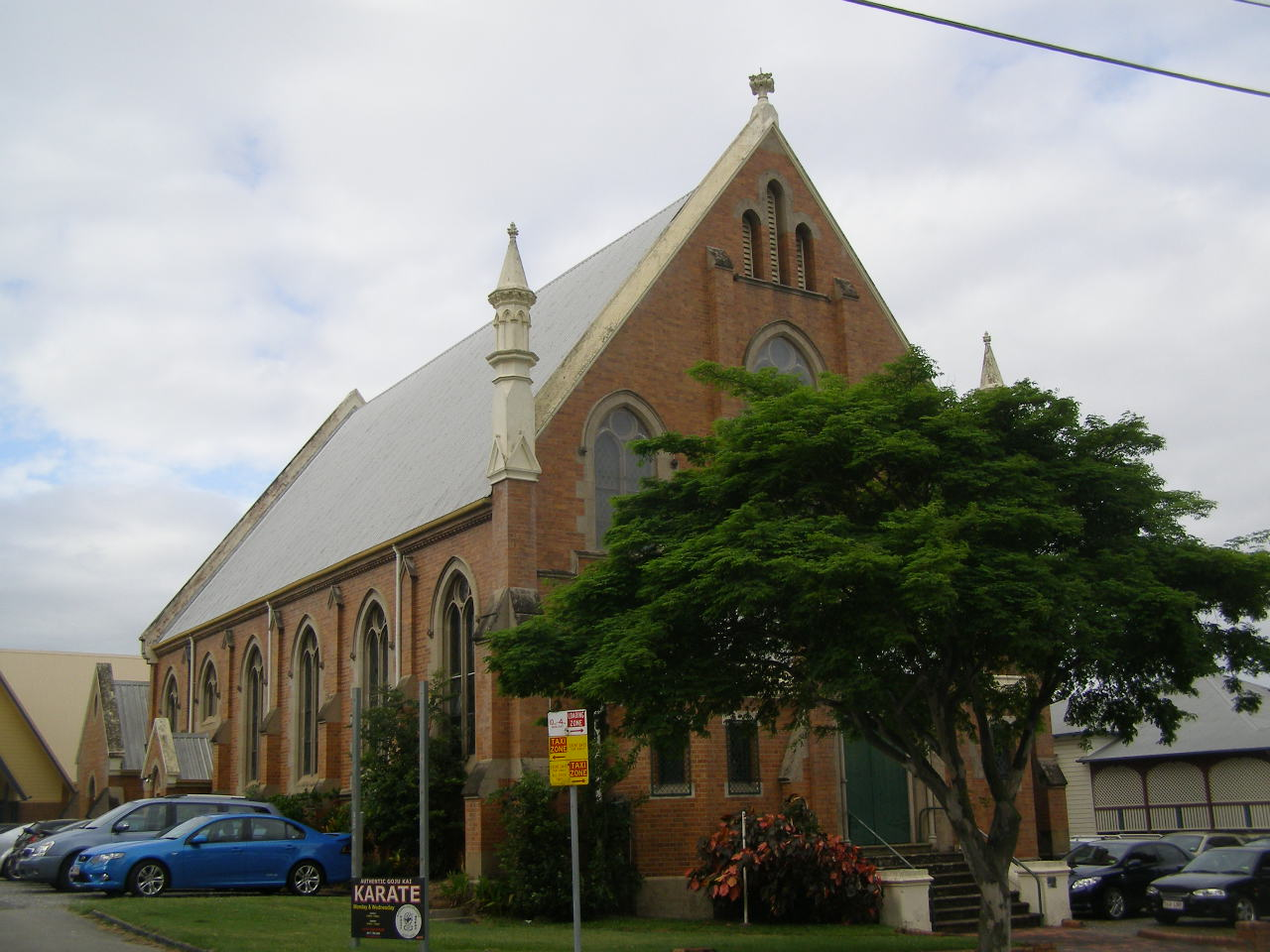
Wesley Uniting Church, 2011

St Mary's Anglican Church is at 455 Main Street (27.4749°S 153.0353°E).

St Joseph's Catholic Church is at 26–36 Leopard Street (27.4829°S 153.0331°E).

Wesley Uniting Church is at 48 Linton Street (27.4837°S 153.0373°E).

St Nicholas Russian Orthodox Cathedral is at 344 Vulture Street (27.4841°S 153.0346°E).

The Brisbane temple of the Church of Jesus Christ of Latter-day Saints (LDS Church) is at 200 River Terrace (27.4809°S 153.0336°E). The gold statue of the Angel Moroni at the top of the spire of the temple is highly visible and illuminated at night.

== Heritage listings ==
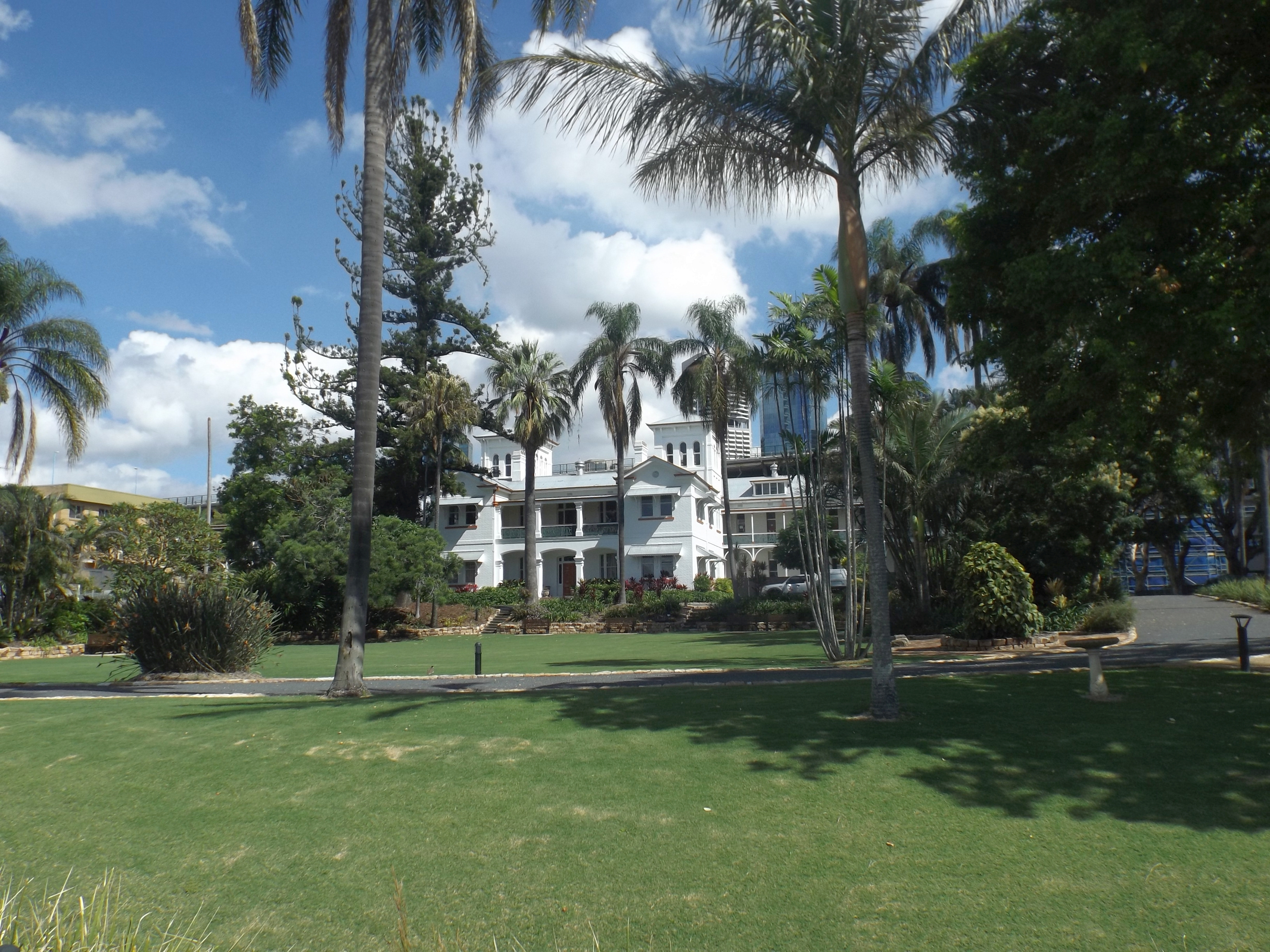
Yungaba Immigration Centre and riverside lawn, 2015

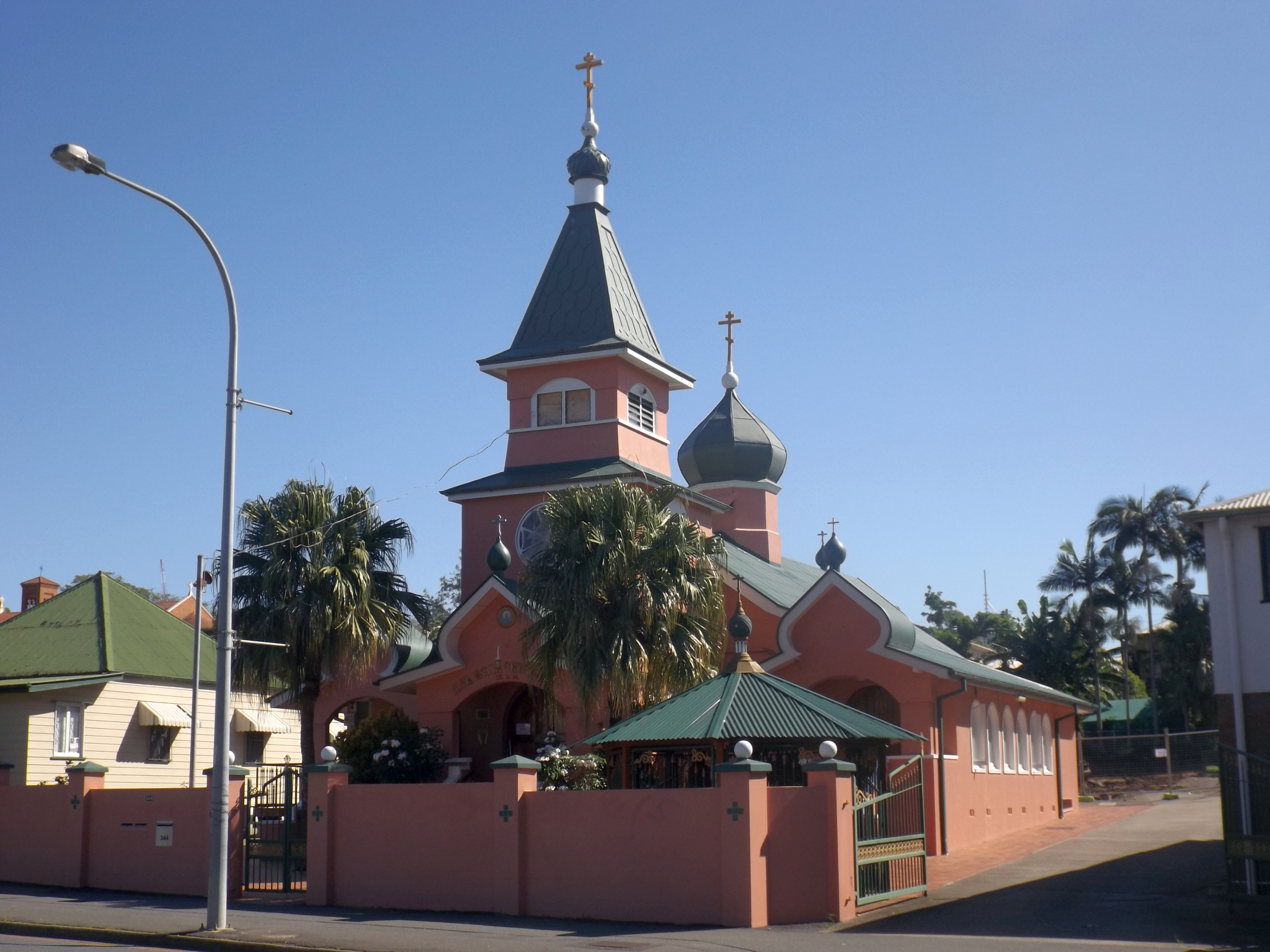
St Nicholas Russian Orthodox Cathedral, 2015

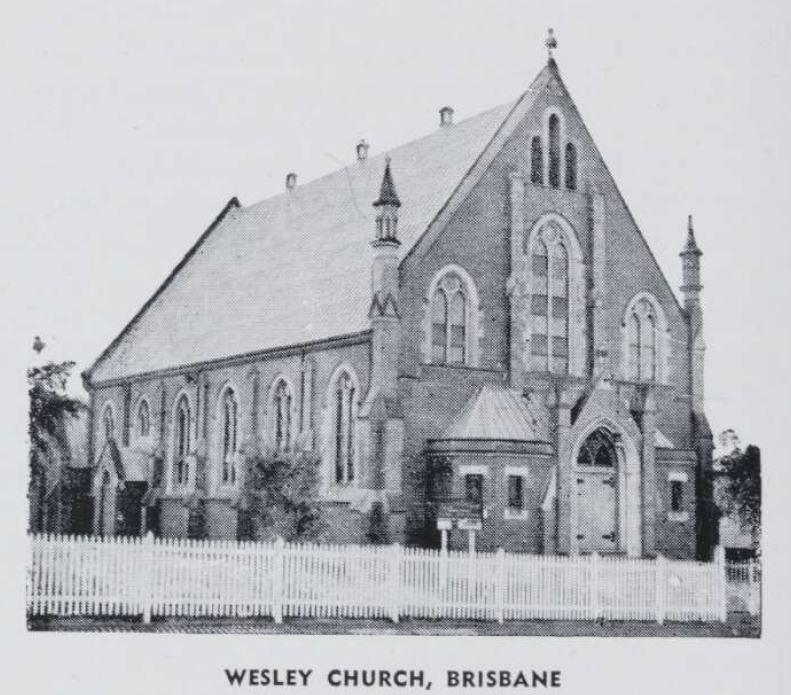
Wesley Methodist Church, circa 1947

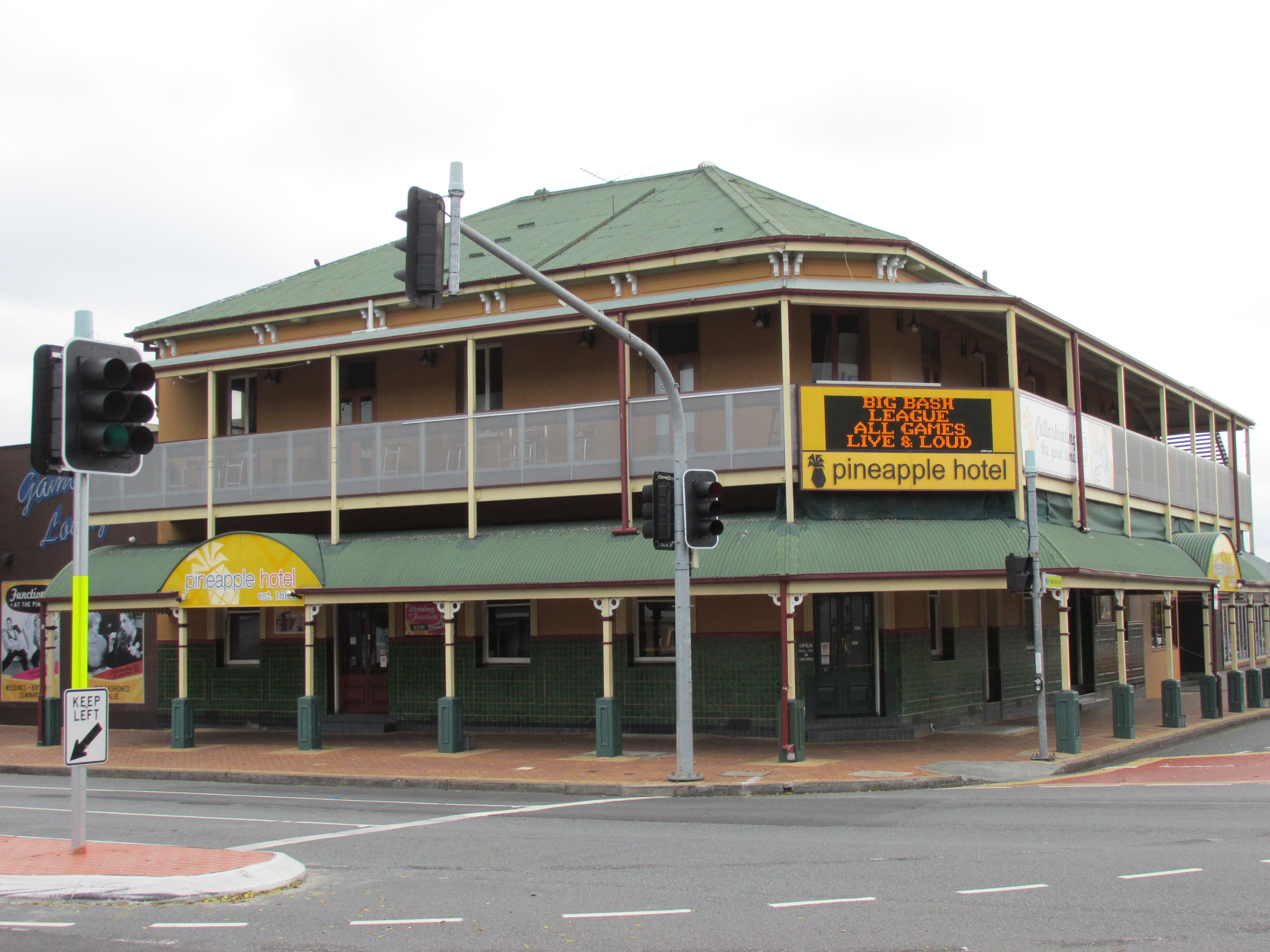
Pineapple Hotel, 2017

Kangaroo Point has a number of heritage-listed sites, including:

- 34 Amesbury Street: former Naval Stores
- 94 Baines Street: Raymond Park (West) Air Raid Shelter
- 28 Bromley Street: Victorian-era house
- 29 Cairns Street: Victorian-era house
- 31 Cairns Street: Victorian-era cottage
- 33 Cairns Street: Victorian-era cottage
- 35 Cairns Street: Victorian-era cottage
- 37 Cairns Street: Dunholme (house, also known as Woniora)
- 72A Cairns Street: former Substation 211
- 78 Cairns Street: former Evans Deakin Dry Dock (also known as Moar's Slip)
- 23 Castlebar Street: Shafston House (also known as Ravenscott, Anzac Hostel, Shafston International College)
- 116 Holman Street: Holman Street Ferry Terminal
- 127 Lambert Street: Alpha Cottage
- 162 Lambert Street: Thornclyffe (house, also known as Neerradah)
- 9 Leopard Street: Lamb House
- 19 Leopard Street: Rockfield (house)
- 36 Leopard Street: St Joseph's Catholic Church, School & Presbytery
- 37 Leopard Street: Ningwood (terrace house)
- 40 Linton Street: Kangaroo Point Uniting Church (formerly Wesley Methodist Church and Parsonage)
- 54 Linton Street: Victorian-era cottage
- 56 Llewellyn Street: Rineston (house, also written as Rinston)
- 88 Lockerbie Street: former St Joseph's Catholic Convent
- Lower River Terrace: Kangaroo Point Cliffs
- 76 Lower River Terrace: Cliffside Apartments (also known as Cliffiside Flats)
- 102 Main Street: Yungaba Immigration Centre (also known as No. 6 Australian General Hospital)
- 184 Main Street: Carroll House
- 200 Main Street: Story Bridge Hotel
- 255 Main Street: Sunnyside (also known as Dr Wright's House)
- 261–267 Main Street: Silverwells
- 301 Main Street: former Police lock-up
- 355 Main Street (27.4724°S 153.0346°E): former Brisbane Travelodge (also known as Olims Apartments)
- 433, 447 & 449 Main Street: St Mary's Anglican Church
- Opposite 450 Main Street (27.4756°S 153.0355°E): former Bus Shelter
- 634 Main Street: Capsellig (house)
- 706 Main Street: Pineapple Hotel (also known as Palmer's Hotel)
- 38 Mark Lane: Federation-era duplex
- 15 Quinton Street: Gowarra (house)
- 17 Quinton Street: Woodooma (house)
- 2 Scott Street: Scott Street Flats (also known as Scott House)
- 69 Shafston Avenue: Leckhampton
- 64 Thorn Street (27.4760°S 153.0410°E): boat shed
- 11 Thornton Street: former Water Police Residence
- 64 Toohey Street: Victorian-era cottage
- 330–334B Vulture Street: St Nicholas Russian Orthodox Cathedral
- 23 Walmsley Street: Doonholm (house)
- 184 Wellington Road: Raymond Park (East) Air Raid Shelter
- 36 Wharf Street: Federation-era house

== Notable people ==
- Frederick Manson Bailey, Australian botanist
- Peter Burge, Australian cricketer
- James Davis, convict and pioneer, blacksmith at Kangaroo Point
- Silvester Diggles, Australian musician and ornithologist
- Alec Hurwood, Australian cricketer
- John Lavarack, former Governor of Queensland, born at Kangaroo Point
- Frances Mallalieu Payne (1885–1976), artist and illustrator
- Alfred John Raymond, alderman for Kangaroo Point and mayor of Brisbane in 1912
- Oscar Werner Tiegs, Australian zoologist
- Cyril Tenison White, Australian botanist, resident of Kangaroo Point
- Christopher Wrench, organist
