= Silverwells, Kangaroo Point =

Silverwells
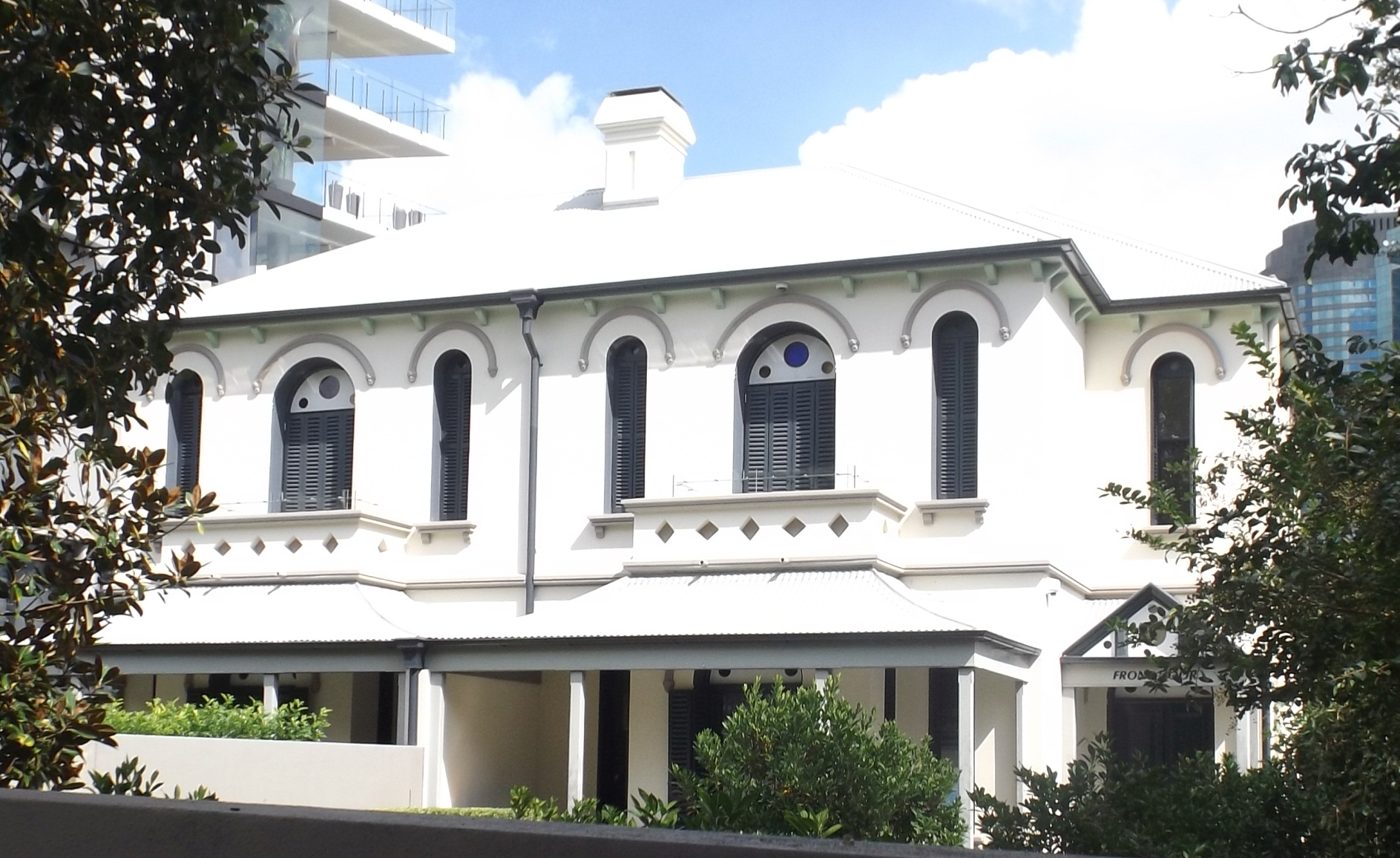
- Building in 2015

- Location within Queensland Location within Australia
- 27.4702°S 153.035°E
- Location: 261–267 Main Street, Kangaroo Point, Queensland, Australia

History
- Design period: 1840s–1860s (mid-19th century)
- Built: c. 1860s

Site notes
- Architectural style: Georgian

Queensland Heritage Register
- Official name: Silverwells, Bishopcroft, Blairgowie, Morningside
- Type: state heritage (landscape, built)
- Designated: 21 October 1992
- Reference no.: 600243
- Significant period: 1860s (fabric)
- Significant components: views to, residential accommodation – maisonette/s / duplex, garden/grounds, service wing, views from, cellar

Silverwells is a heritage-listed duplex at 261–267 Main Street, Kangaroo Point, Queensland, Australia. It was built in c. 1860s. It is also known as Bishopcroft, Blairgowie, and Morningside. It was added to the Queensland Heritage Register on 21 October 1992.

== History ==
The land on which these semi-detached houses stand was acquired in 1861 by Sydney merchant Joseph Thompson. It is believed he purchased a number of Kangaroo Point properties on which he erected various dwellings in the 1860s, and that the semi-detached houses were amongst these rental investments.

No precise date of construction has been identified, but the houses are prominent in a photograph of Kangaroo Point taken between 1867 and the mid-1870s. As Edward Lamb, an occupant in the 1870s, was resident in Main Street in 1867–8, it is possible that the pair was constructed by then. Thompson retained the property until his death in 1902, when it passed to William Mann Thompson, who subsequently subdivided the land. Since 1924 the houses have been held under separate title, with the northern house generally owner-occupied, but the southern one being a rental property from the 1930s to the 1950s.

Over more than one hundred and twenty years the houses have maintained their status as genteel accommodation, whose tenants have numbered amongst Brisbane's more successful business, legal and political figures.

== Description ==
This pair of two-storeyed semi-detached brick houses stands in a garden setting between the Story Bridge and the Town Reach of the Brisbane River, with city views from the rear of the property.

They rest on a foundation of Brisbane tuff and share a common hipped roof and a central double chimney which rises above the party wall. The roof is clad with corrugated galvanised iron, but is likely to have been shingled or slated originally. Console brackets beneath narrow eaves define the lower roofline.

The Georgian-styled rendered exterior is scored to resemble ashlar, and presents a symmetrical front facade to Main Street. Entrances are set back at either end under small pedimented porticos, and the upper storey of each house features narrow, round-headed windows either side of large French doors. These open onto a small balcony above a projecting ground floor bay. All the second-level windows and doors are protected by curved drip moulding and full-length shutters.

Detailing is unusual in the use of round or diamond-shaped holes "punched" through the pediments, window heads and balconies.

Front verandahs at ground floor level are separated by a masonry wall and feature discrete concave, corrugated iron awnings supported by broad timber posts. A set of French doors opens onto each verandah from the drawing rooms.

Internally each house is a mirror image of the other, with ground floor hall, drawing room and dining room, a bathroom at the first landing, and bedrooms on the top floor. Ceilings at the lower level are 13 feet 6 inches (4.11 m) (4 metres (13 ft)) high and an archway with folding cedar doors separates the drawing and dining rooms. Cellars lie beneath the ground floors.

At the rear remain the detached single-storey service wings, each formerly containing kitchen and maid's room. The northern kitchen has been modernised internally, and the southern one has been refitted as a guest suite. The rear verandah of the southern house has been remodelled as the kitchen.

1970s renovation of the northern house also resulted in the installation of an attic bedroom with a small balcony at the rear, enclosure and extension of the back verandah to create a living space, and the addition of a terrace and pool to the back yard. Despite the alterations, the pair presents a highly intact and cohesive exterior, with the semi-detached relationship not immediately apparent.

== Heritage listing ==
Silverwells was listed on the Queensland Heritage Register on 21 October 1992 having satisfied the following criteria.

The place is important in demonstrating the evolution or pattern of Queensland's history.

Silverwells is associated with the 1860s development of the higher ground at Kangaroo Point as a genteel address.

Silverwells is possibly the oldest residential building remaining at Kangaroo Point.

The place demonstrates rare, uncommon or endangered aspects of Queensland's cultural heritage.

Silverwells is a rare Brisbane semi-detached brick housing, more common in Sydney in the 1860s.

The place is important because of its aesthetic significance.

The residence contributes aesthetically to the facade of the Kangaroo Point townscape.
