= Kangaroo Point Cliffs =

Cliffs in Queensland, Australia

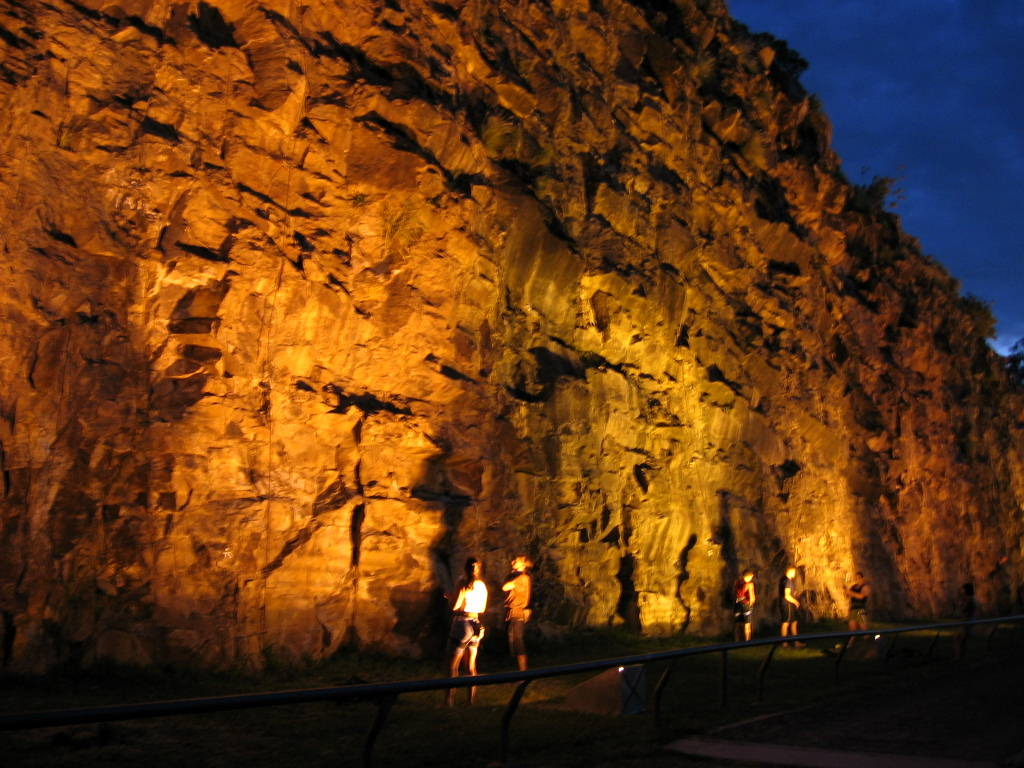
- Cliffs after sunset

- Location within Queensland
- Coordinates: 27°28′43″S 153°02′03″E
- Type of climbing: Top Rope, Trad and Sport
- Height range: 18 m
- Quantity of routes: 408 routes
- Access: < 5 min

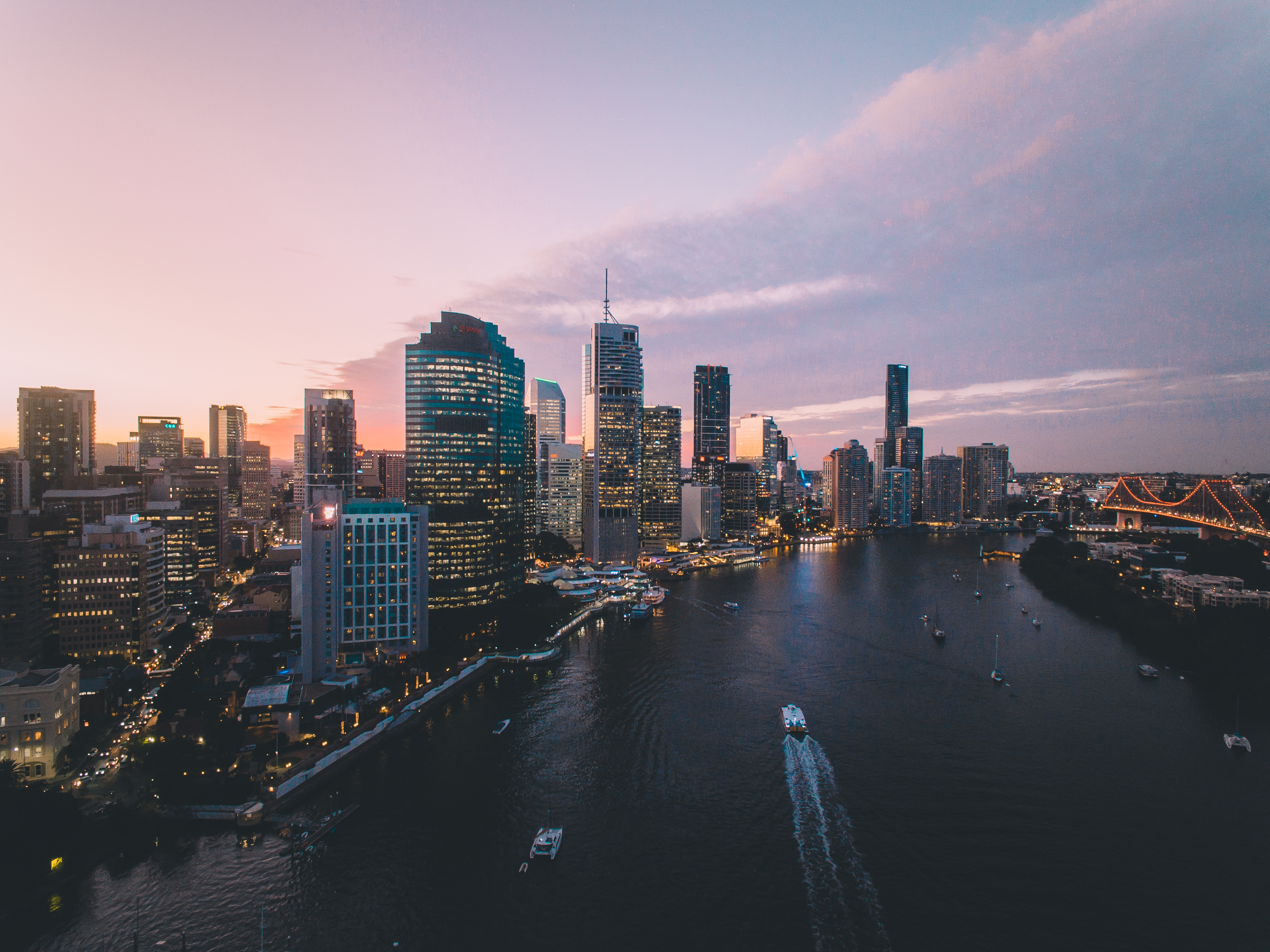
View of Brisbane from the Cliffs

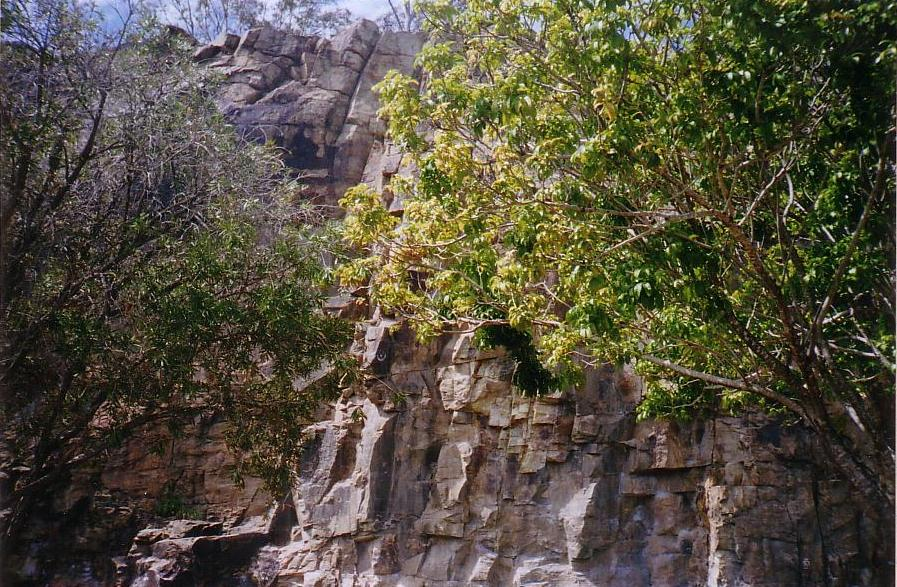
Kangaroo Point Cliffs

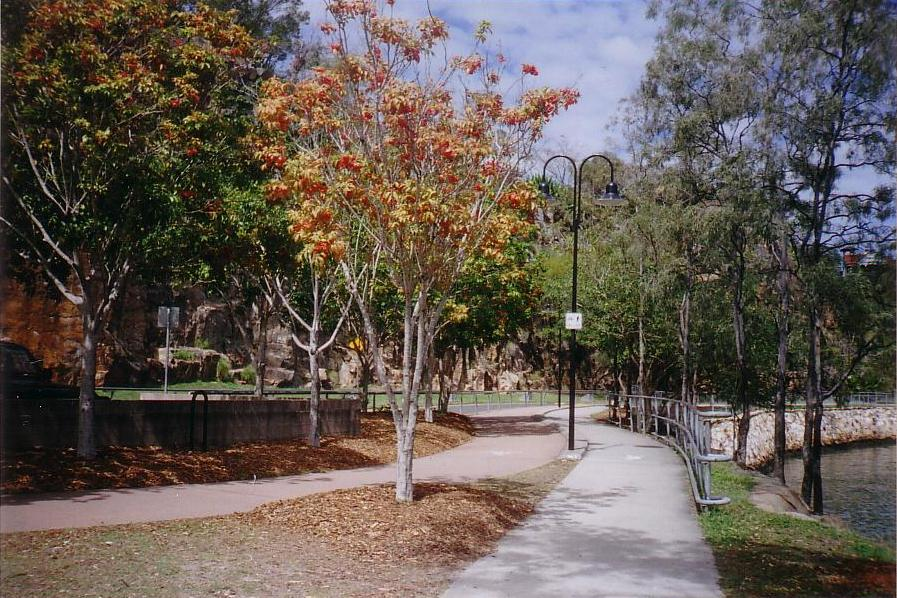
Kangaroo Point Cliffs parkland

The Kangaroo Point Cliffs are heritage-listed cliffs located at Kangaroo Point just across the Brisbane River from the Brisbane CBD in Queensland, Australia. A popular recreation spot, especially for climbing and running, they are conveniently close to the city and the South Bank Parklands. The cliffs can be accessed by footpath from South Bank Parklands, Kangaroo Point Green Bridge or the Story Bridge, and also via ferry to either Holman Street or Maritime Museum ferry terminals. The cliffs were formed after stone was quarried from the site and used in the construction of a number of local structures in the Moreton Bay penal settlement.

== History ==
The Kangaroo Point Cliffs were created by convicts mining the volcanic rock or ignimbrite or welded tuff which form the cliffs. These lavas and pyroclastic rocks were deposited in the Triassic Period about 230 million years ago and filled an ancient river valley. These rocks were known colloquially but incorrectly as porphyry and later became known as the geological unit called the Brisbane tuff.

Records indicate that it was Captain Patrick Logan, commandant of the Moreton Bay penal settlement, who first opened a quarry to supply stone to his building works as early as 1826. Those structures still standing today include The Old Windmill and the Commissariat Store.

From 1842, the quarry was rented to private stonemasons (including John Petrie, later the first Mayor of Brisbane) until it was taken over by the Brisbane Municipal Council in 1860. It continued to supply stone as sailing ballast for ships. The Rector of St Mary's Church above the quarry believed this was a wasteful use of the stone and convinced the Queensland Colonial Government to take over control, which it did in 1864.

In the 1880s, the government developed coal wharves along the southern end of the cliffs. They were serviced by a rail line and siding until the wharf was demolished in 1974. A marine defence depot was built at the foot of the northern end of the cliffs. It was used for storage and as a training facility. One of the buildings used by the depot remains today as the Naval Stores Museum.

Stone from the quarry was used to line parts of the Brisbane River with walls, for the Manly Boat Harbour and at the new Port of Brisbane. The quarry finally closed in 1976.

== Climbing ==
The cliffs are situated on the east bank of the river north of the Maritime Museum and opposite the Queensland University of Technology. The area is a popular picnic and abseiling site. The Kangaroo Point Cliffs feature excellent rock climbing possibilities for all skill levels, being primarily a place for recreational climbing. The cliffs are mainly used as a training ground by South East Queensland's rock climbers. The cliff face is lit at night by numerous flood lights.

== Facilities ==
At the base of the cliff, next to the Brisbane River, is a narrow strip of parkland. The park contains electric barbecues, tables and chairs, sculptures, toilets and ample views of the Captain Cook Bridge, Story Bridge, mangroves, the City Botanic Gardens and downtown buildings across the river. Native vegetation has been redeveloped into gardens which display a very natural design.

At the top of the cliffs is Scout Park. It was opened in 1982 to commemorate 75 years of the scouting movement in Queensland. A new park was created at the site of the former TAFE college in 2010.

== Heritage listing ==
The cliffs were listed on the Queensland Heritage Register in 2003.

== See also ==
- List of parks in Brisbane
- Sport in Brisbane
