= Moggill =

- Suburb
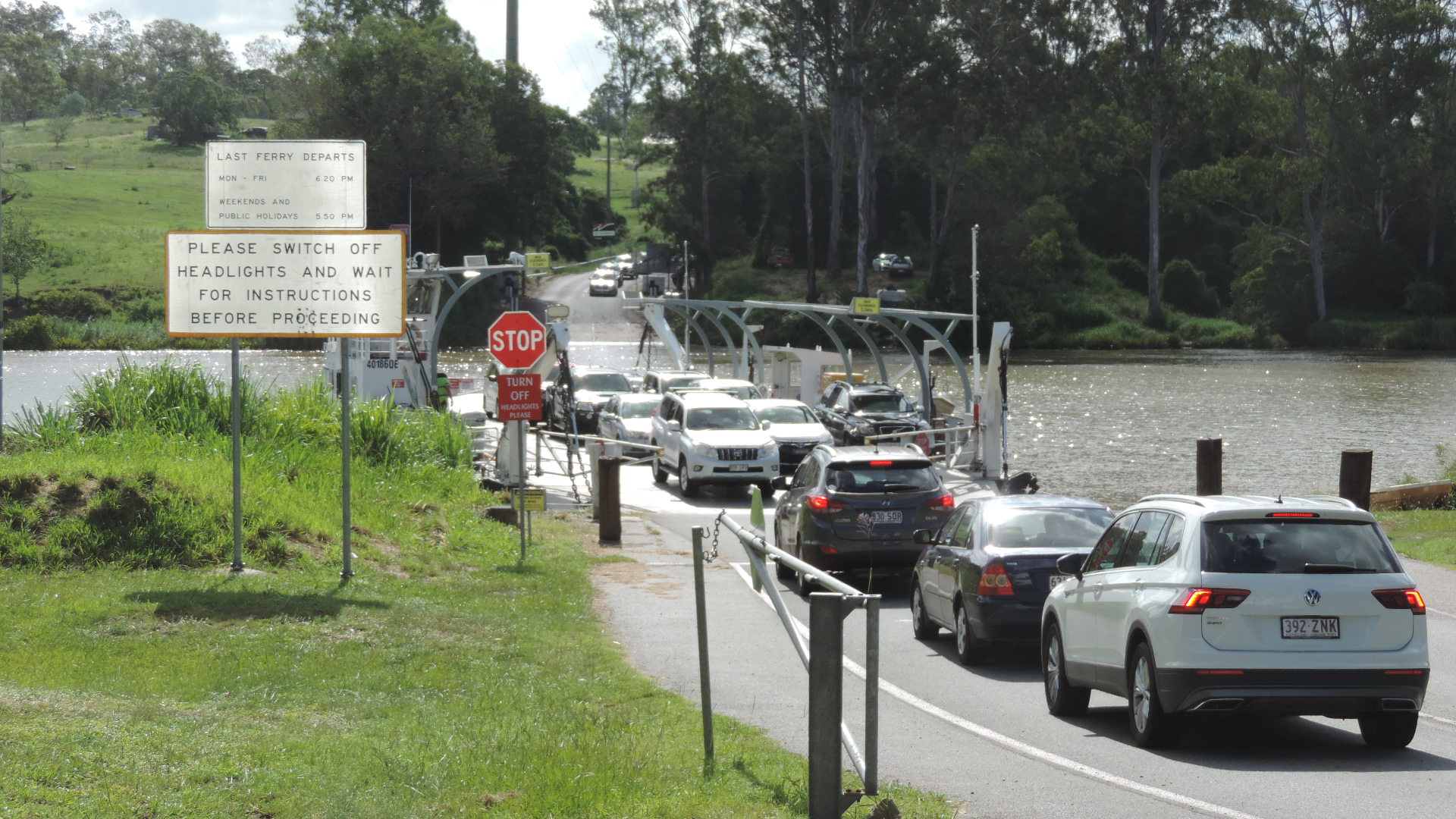
- Cars disembarking to Moggill from the Moggill ferry while other cars wait to board, 2021

- Interactive map of Moggill
- Coordinates: 27.5772°S 152.8774°E
- Country: Australia
- State: Queensland
- City: Brisbane
- LGA: City of Brisbane (Pullenvale Ward)
- Location: 22.3 km (13.9 mi) SW of Brisbane CBD

Government
  - State electorate: Moggill
  - Federal division: Ryan

Area
  - Total: 11.7 km^{2} (4.5 sq mi)

Population
  - Total: 5,029 (2021 census)
  - Density: 429.8/km^{2} (1,113/sq mi)
- Time zone: UTC+10:00 (AEST)
- Postcode: 4070
Suburbs around Moggill
Anstead	Bellbowrie	Riverhills
Barellan Point	Moggill	Wacol
Riverview	Goodna	Wacol

Moggill is a suburb in the City of Brisbane, Queensland, Australia. In the 2021 census, Moggill had a population of 5,029 people.

== Geography ==
Moggill is about 22.3 kilometres (14 mi) from the Brisbane CBD.

The Brisbane River bounds the suburb to the east, south and west with two of its reaches:

- Cockatoo Reach (27.5886°S 152.8983°E)
- Redbank Reach (27.59°S 152.8658°E)

Priors Pocket is a neighbourhood in the south-east of the suburb (27.5983°S 152.9011°E). It is also known as Toocoobah. It was gazetted on16 August 1975 and was named Thomas Lodge Murray-Prior, who was an early land holder freeholder in the area.

It comprises a mixture of small-lot and acreage residential homes along with a small number of remaining farms. Moggill is located in the Parish of Moggill within the County of Stanley, Queensland.

== History ==
Garumngar (also known as Dalla, Garumga. See also Wakka Wakka related languages/dialects) is a language of the Upper Brisbane River catchment. The Garumngar language region includes the landscape within the local government boundaries of the Ipswich, Brisbane, Somerset and Moreton Bay Regional Councils, particularly the towns of Dayboro and Esk extending east towards Moggill.

The Brisbane River and Moggill Creek were rich in resources and evidence of Aboriginal occupation includes bora grounds near the Moggill Pony Club and O'Brien Road. Another Bora ring is located at the end of Riversleigh Road.

John Oxley the first European visitor, named it Termination Plains when he landed in the Priors Pocket area in 1823.

In 1846, the first paddle steamer service from Brisbane to Ipswich began, travelling along the Brisbane and Bremer rivers past Moggill. At least eight steamers operated between 1846 and 1875, the trip taking four to seven hours. Previously a row boat operated by convicts would take around 12 hours from Brisbane to Ipswich and punts flowing with the tide would take several days.

In 1848, a profitable coal mine owned by John Williams commenced operation.

In 1849, The Moreton Bay Courier noted that land near "Moghill Creek" might be soon put up for sale, with settlers who arrived on The Fortitude given some assistance to help with a purchase. The first survey of Moggill was in 1851, with a township planned in the vicinity of Weekes Rd, however it was later established near the present school.

Moggill Cemetery was established in 1865.

The Moggill State School opened on 12 February 1866, with 53 students enrolled, and an average attendance of 31-24 boys and 13 girls. The school began as a two-room schoolhouse and remaining that way until 1970 when the population of the area started expanding rapidly. The school celebrated its sesquicentenary (150th anniversary) on 12 February 2016.

In 1868 the Moggill Methodist Church was built at the corner of Moggill Road and Kangaroo Gully Road (27.5699°S 152.8750°E). Originally it had neither lining or ceiling, and had a shingle roof and cedar window frames. The church remains on the grounds of the Moggill Uniting Church (27.5693°S 152.8750°E).

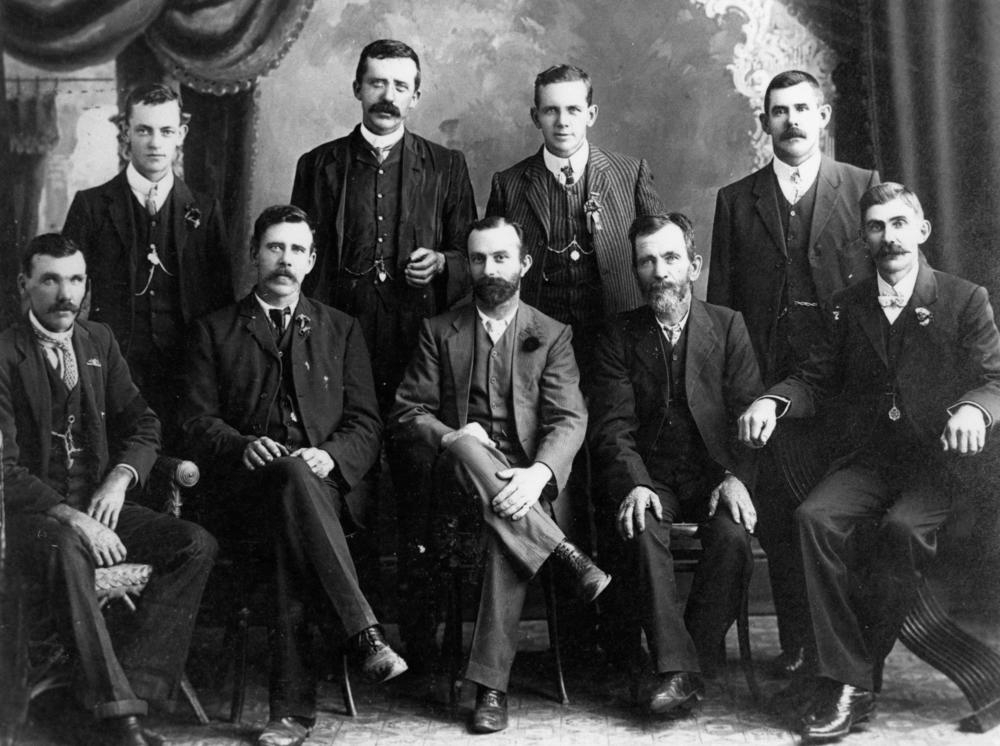
Men of the Anstead family, early settlers in the Moggill area.

In 1877 Moggill and the Moggill residents were described thus in The Queensland Times newspaper:

"The Moggill farmers are a well-to-do class, not with standing the fact that their holdings are comparatively small, and they are dependent entirely on agricultural pursuits, there being no outside country to be made use of for the running of cattle. The land is, for the most part, composed of rich alluvial deposits, and its quality is such that it is very hard to exhaust it. There are parts of the district where the soil is patchy, and there are places where it is rather difficult to cultivate, but these disadvantages are more than counterbalanced by the richness of the remaining portions, from which crops of more than average yield are taken each successive season."

The Moggill punt (ferry) was important as a means of transport across the Brisbane River. In 1884 the ferry sank and was eventually replaced with a hand pulled, rope guided ferry.

In 1886 Colledge Brothers, a contracting firm, secured a 10-year lease with the option of a further 10-year extension from Thomas Sugars to open the Moggill Blue Metal Quarry, four miles above the Bremer River, employing 20 men. in 1924 the Moggill Quarry was purchased by the Gravel, Sand and Metal Supply Ltd. for £4500. Mr J Anstead became the works manager.

In 1968, the original Moggill State School building was moved to an adjacent block of land to become the Anglican Church.

In 1973, Moggill was divided into three suburbs, the other two were named Anstead and Bellbowrie. The name of the creek is derived from 'Magil', from Yuggera (Jagera) Nation language meaning water dragon.

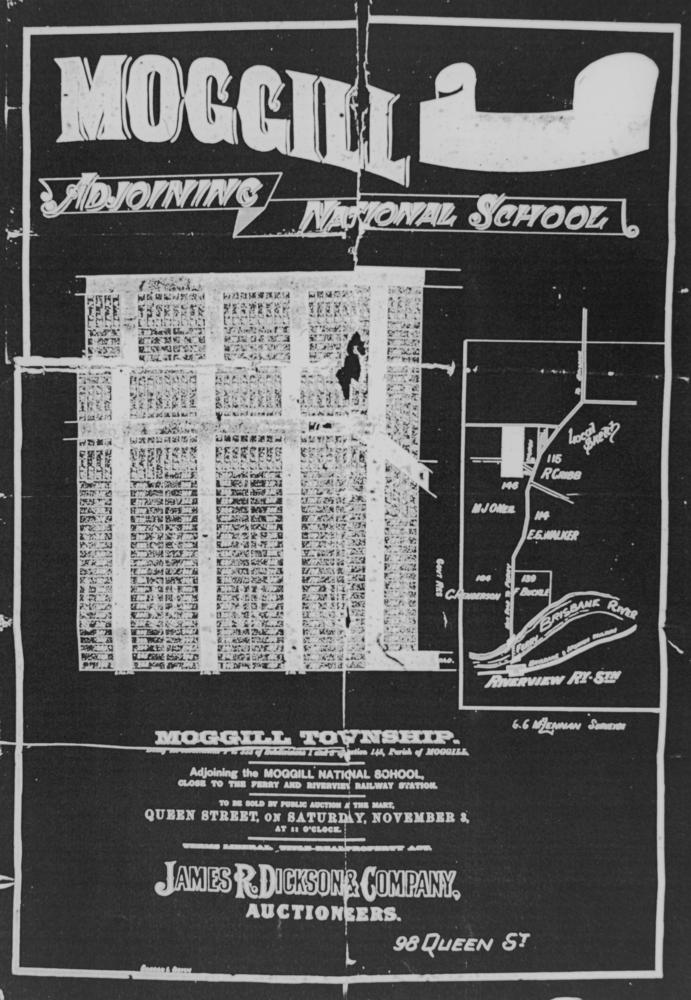
Estate map for a sale of land in Moggill (1888)

After 2004, the traditional Moggill pineapple farms, situated on the rich red clay soils around Witty Road and Priors Pocket Road, began to be subdivided for housing. There was vocal opposition to the subdivision from Moggill residents, who wished to preserve the rural amenity of the area with larger block sizes. In spite of this, the average block size of the new estates is around 700 m².

== Demographics ==
In the 2011 census, Moggill had a population of 3,606 people; 51.1% female and 48.9% male. The median age of the Moggill population was 34 years of age, 3 years below the Australian median. Children aged under 15 years made up 27.2% of the population and people aged 65 years and over made up 9.1% of the population. 67.1% of people living in Moggill were born in Australia, similar to the national average of 69.8%; the next most common countries of birth were England 7.3%, South Africa 5.8%, New Zealand 3.6%, India 1.4%, Zimbabwe 0.9%. 86.3% of people spoke only English at home; the next most popular languages were 1.7% Afrikaans, 0.9% Sinhalese, 0.9% Mandarin, 0.7% Spanish, 0.6% Korean. The most common religious affiliation was "No Religion" 25.9%; the next most common responses were Catholic 24.1%, Anglican 18.5%, Uniting Church 6.7% and "Christian, nfd" 4.1%.

In the 2016 census, Moggill had a population of 4,641 people.

In the 2021 census, Moggill had a population of 5,029 people.

== Local government administration ==
Moggill has been administered by six local government entities:

1. Ipswich-Bundamba between 1876 and 1878 (Qld Electoral Rolls 1860–1884)
2. Toowong Division between 1879 and 1880;
3. Indooroopilly Division between 2 June 1880 and 31 March 1903;
4. Indooroopilly Shire between 31 March 1903 and 8 December 1917;
5. Moggill Shire between 8 December 1917 and 1 October 1925 and
6. Brisbane City Council from 1 October 1925.

== Heritage listings ==
Moggill has a number of heritage-liste sites, including:

- 3407 Moggill Road: St Michael's Anglican Church (former Moggill State School)
- 3451 Moggill Road: former Moggill Methodist Church
- 3600 Moggill Road: Riverside Colliery Residence
- 351 Priors pocket Road: Fig Tree Lodge

== Education ==
Moggill State School is a government primary (Prep-6) school for boys and girls at 3417 Moggill Road (27.5692°S 152.8776°E). Enrolments in 2016 were 680 students. In 2018, the school had an enrolment of 750 students with 60 teachers (48 full-time equivalent) and 25 non-teaching staff (17 full-time equivalent). It includes a special education program.

There are no secondary schools in Moggill. The nearest government secondary school is Kenmore State High School, in Aberfeldy Street, Kenmore, which offers secondary education between Grades 7 to 12, and contains Moggill within its catchment area.

== Emergency services ==
=== Police ===
Moggill is within the Brisbane West District of the Metropolitan North Region of the Queensland Police Service. The Bellbowire Neighbourhood Police Beat, located at 5 Westaway Crescent, Bellbowrie, provides Moggill with an effective policing presence in an urban situation. The nearest police station within the Metropolitan North Region is Indooroopilly Police Station. Ignoring the established District, police stations closer than Indooroopilly are Karana Downs Station, Goodna Station and Mount Ommaney Station.

=== Medical ===
The Queensland Ambulance Service provide emergency care and transport services for Moggill residents. Funding was allocated within the Queensland Government's 2010-11 State Budget for the initial planning stage of a new ambulance station at Pinjarra Hills which will be equipped with multiple ambulances and first responders. The Pinjarra Hills ambulance station will be the closest but not the only ambulance station caring for Moggill residents.

=== Fire and rescue ===
Moggill is located within the City West Command of the Brisbane Region of the Queensland Fire and Rescue Service. In May 2010 construction commenced on a new fire station, located at 6 Pullenvale Road, Pullenvale, to replace the Kenmore Fire Station. The Pullenvale fire station will be the closest but not the only fire station serving Moggill residents.

=== Evacuation centre ===
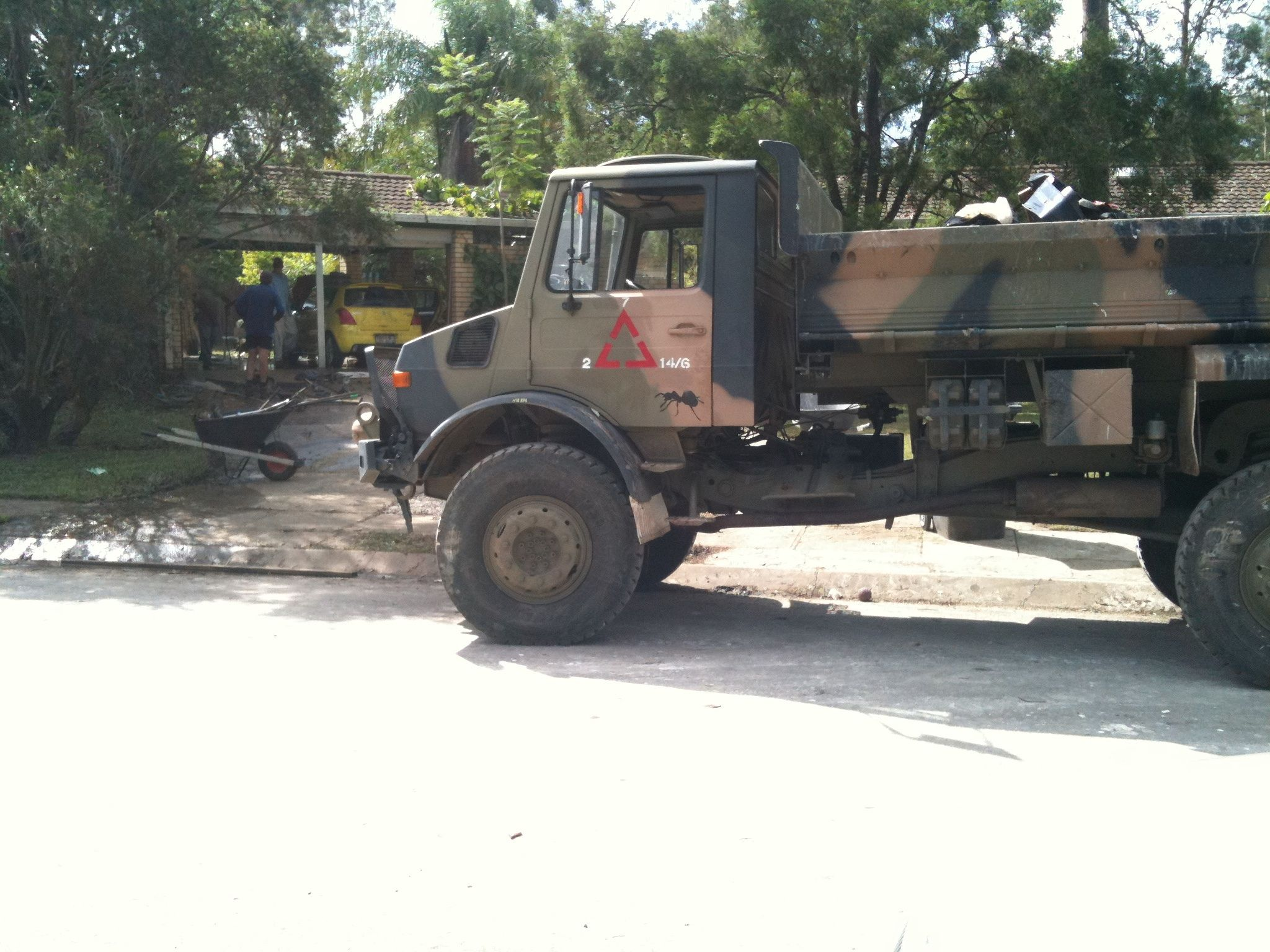
Army vehicle used in the clean-up following the 2011 floods.

During the 2011 Brisbane River flood the Uniting Church, corner Moggill and Kangaroo Gully Roads, was used as an unofficial evacuation centre.

== Transport ==
=== Water ===
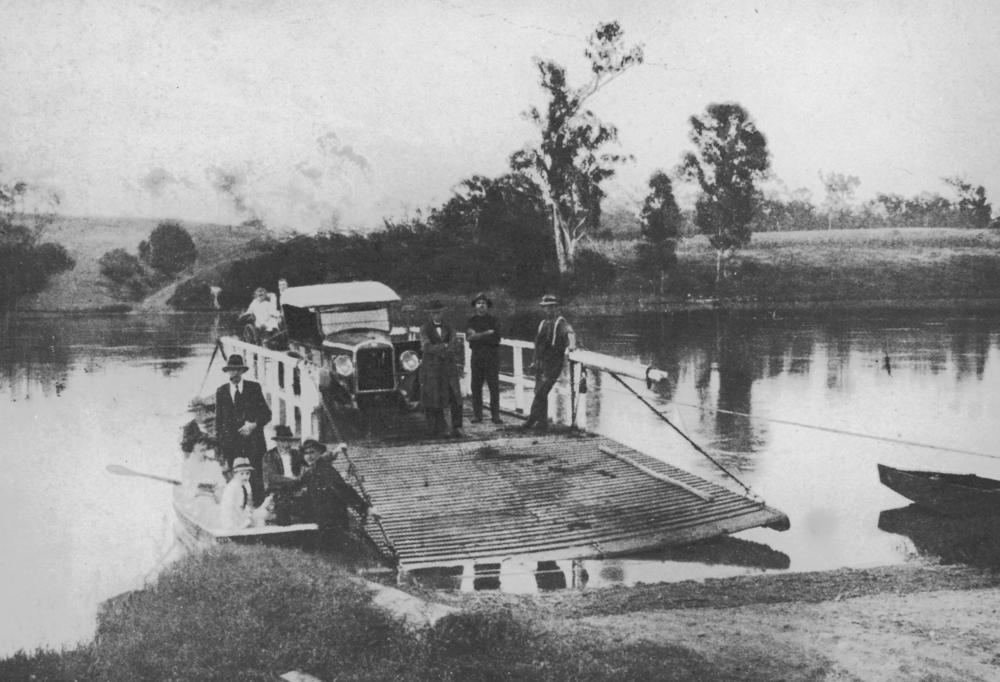
Moggill Ferry, 1928

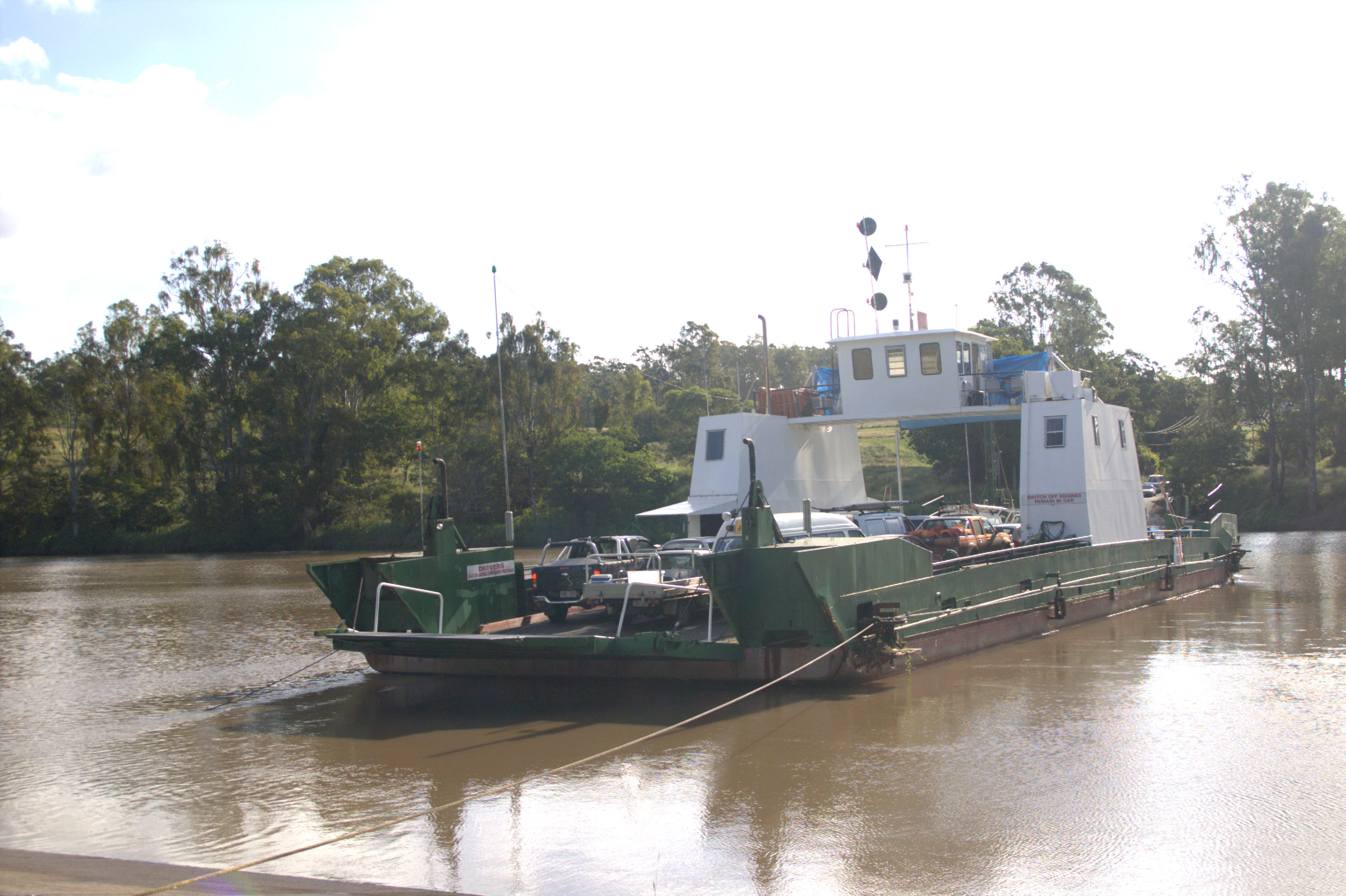
Moggill Ferry, 2008

Moggill Ferry, a tolled vehicular cable ferry, crosses the Brisbane River between Moggill Road, Moggill, and Moggill Ferry Road, Riverview (27.5947°S 152.8566°E). The ferry was motorised in the 1940s under the joint control of the Ipswich and Brisbane City Councils. As of 2010, the service is provided by Stradbroke Ferries Ltd. The communities on either side of the Brisbane River have for a long time been divided on the topic of replacing the ferry service with a bridge. Those opposed to a bridge say: the ferry is historical; the rural lifestyle on the north side of the river will be replaced with urban sprawl; Moggill Road already suffers from congestion; and the cost would be too great. Those in favour of a bridge say : there is a lack of alternative convenient river crossings (nearest are Colleges Crossing and Jindalee); the ferry does not operate at night; sporadic halts to service occur due to mechanical breakdowns; and severe weather causes dangerous river debris and strong river currents. The ferry is free for pedestrians and bicycles.

During the 2011 Brisbane River flood, the service was suspended and the ferry secured on the western bank. On 12 January 2011, when the river reached the peak of 18 metres its force broke one of its 2 cables. An assessment was made as to whether to sink, demolish or secure the ferry to prevent it becoming a 'missile' downstream if it came free. A decision was made to further secure it with a 1.5 tonne anchor, which was flown in by helicopter.

=== Road ===
Utilising Moggill Road, State Route 33, Brisbane via Toowong, Indooroopilly and Bellbowrie to Riverview, bisects Moggill. It has both a single and dual carriageway within Moggill.

An alternative location for a bridge to replace Moggill Ferry is proposed within the Moggill Pocket Arterial Road Transport Corridor. Land has been set aside by the Queensland government as a future transport corridor passing through the suburbs of Kenmore, Pullenvale, Anstead and Karalee to connect the Centenary Highway at Fig Tree Pocket with the Warrego Highway at North Tivoli.

On 15 February 2011, the Brisbane Times reported that the Queensland government were re-evaluating the possibility of constructing a bridge over the Brisbane River.

=== Bus ===
Transport for Brisbane operate two bus services, routes P443 and 444, under the Translink integrated public transport scheme. Both services connect Moggill, via Moggill Road and Coronation Drive, with King George Square busway station. Route 444 carries on across Brisbane River to the Cultural Centre busway station, South Brisbane. Route P443 is an express service between Chapel Hill and Roma Street busway station.

There is no bus service to both Ipswich CBD, a major commercial and industrial area approximately 12 kilometres (7.5 mi) away, and the City of Ipswich Local Government Area which is on the other side of the Brisbane River.

=== Taxicab ===
The Council Cab and Karana Downs Personalised Public Transport (PPT) services are provided by Brisbane City Council. The Council Cab is offered to a pre-defined list of residents who find it difficult to get to their local shops. The Karana Downs PPT services areas where Translink services are restricted with Black and White Cabs providing wheelchair accessible and air conditioned maxi-cabs. The Karana Downs PPT is a hail and ride service with a fixed route, within Moggill it is along Kangaroo Gully and Moggill Roads (including Moggill State School).

Black & White Cabs and Yellow Cabs provide commercial taxicab services for Moggill within the Metropolitan Taxi District of Brisbane.

== Public libraries ==
Brisbane City Council provides a mobile library service every Thursday at Bellbowrie Shopping Plaza, Bellbowrie. The nearest Brisbane City Council branch public library is Kenmore Library, located within Kenmore Village Shopping Centre, Kenmore.

== Utilities ==
=== Water ===
Water is sourced from the SEQ Water Grid.

Since November 2009, the supply of water to Moggill has been managed by Queensland Urban Utilities when it took over the Water Retail and Water Distribution business units of Brisbane City Council. Moggill residents are affected by steep increases to the Bulk Water Prices that are set by the Queensland Water Commission. In August 2008, the Queensland Water Commission published a forward estimate audit table outlining Bulk Water Prices for every year from 2007/2008 until 2017/2018: the Brisbane City Council Bulk Water Prices in 2007/2008 was $628/ML, by 2017/2018 it is estimated to be $2,755 per ML. In September 2010, there has been much political debate relating to future Bulk Water Prices.

The Queensland Water Commission decision to introduce permanent water conservation measures on 1 December 2009 is designed to encourage suburbs, including Moggill, to continue to use less than 200 litres per person per day (as well as other measures).

=== Wastewater ===
Wastewater from Moggill is pumped across the Brisbane River to the Wacol Wastewater Treatment Plant (WWTP) located in Grindle Road, Wacol.

From July 2010, Queensland Urban Utilities took over the management of Brisbane City Council's sewerage catchment system, which includes Moggill. Brisbane City Council is a joint owner of Queensland Urban Utilities.

In 2009, when Brisbane City Council still managed the sewerage catchment system, the Council published a need for a New Sewerage Transportation Infrastructure due to local population increases resulting in sewerage catchment growth. The Council's preferred augmentation works involve "developing a greenfield sewerage system in Moggill and Bellbowrie" with 10 pumping stations that connect to Wacol WWTP being switched off.

The likelihood of a greenfield sewerage system in Moggill and Bellbowrie in the foreseeable future is slim when considering the capacity of the Wacol WWTP is 8.4 ML per day but it is only treating 4 ML per day. If Queensland Urban Utilities adopted a Brisbane City Council treatment capacity strategy, its implementation will result in Wacol WWTP being able to treat 12 ML per day to meet ultimate flows from the catchment, which Moggill plays a small part in. Treated water from Wacol WWTP is transported to the Bundamba Advanced Water Treatment Plant (AWTP), which is part of the Western Corridor Recycled Water Scheme. Bundamba AWTP also sources water from the Bundamba, Goodna and Oxley WWTPs. The Bundamba AWTP has a capacity to produce up to 66 ML per day of treated water and by 2009 it was receiving a total of 61.6 ML per day, it was operating at 93.3% capacity. The Brisbane City Council treatment capacity strategy (mentioned above) had plans for Oxley WWTP to increases capacity from the existing 42.5 ML per day to 65 ML per day then to 90 ML per day to meet the ultimate flows from the catchment, representing an additional 47.5 ML per day beyond its 2009 capacity. Increasing the capacity of Oxley WWTP will also require expensive capacity upgrades to Bundamba AWTP. A greenfield sewerage system in Moggill and Bellbowrie is unlikely any time soon.

=== Electricity ===
Moggill is located within the South East Queensland electricity distribution network owned and operated by Energex. From July 2007, Moggill residents and businesses were able to choose their electricity retailer due to the commencement of competition.

== Community groups ==
Moggill Historical Society was formed in 2013 to research, preserve and promote the history and heritage of the Moggill district including the Brisbane suburbs of Anstead, Bellbowrie, Pullenvale and Pinjarra Hills.

There is a Moggill branch of the Country Women's Association which meets on the third Thursday of the month at 9.30am at the Bellbowrie Community Church, 3077 Moggill Road.

== Sport clubs ==
No sport clubs are located in Moggill. Due to the history of the Moggill area, there are several sports clubs that use the town's name in their title, they are located in neighbouring Bellbowrie and nearby Pullenvale. These include the Moggill Football Club and Moggill Cricket Club both situated at the Bellbowrie Sports and Recreation Club.

The former Moggill Country Club, established in the 1960s, was a privately owned golf course and club that was located at the eastern end of Weekes Road. In 2010, the land was described as "an overgrown paddock" and an application was submitted to Brisbane City Council to sub-divide the land into 93 residential lots (development concept on-going since 2004). The Country Club was, up until its closure, one of the oldest sporting and social clubs in the area.

== Sport fields ==
In 2010, Brisbane City Council used the local print media to communicate a draft concept plan for a future Moggill District Sports Park to be located along Moggill Road on Council acquired land. The draft concept plan envisaged the District Sports Park will have facilities and change rooms to cater for several sports:

- 1 Rugby League/Union senior field;
- 1 Rugby League/Union junior area;
- 4 Netball courts;
- 4 Tennis courts;
- 2 Cricket oval, turf and normal + nets and
- 1 Australian Football oval.

The District Sports Park is planned for multiple uses with the layout changing depending on the sport seasons.

In 2010, a cricket oval was constructed on the corner of Moggill and Priors Pocket Roads as part of a residential housing subdivision known as The Pitch.

== Parks ==
Moggill Ferry Reserve, Moggill Road, next to Moggill Ferry, has facilities including a playground, barbecue & shelter but no toilets.

Westaway Park in Witty Street has playground equipment, barbecue facilities and toilets.

Other parks within Moggill are:

- Aitcheson Street (no.5-6), Aitcheson Street (East), adjoining Brisbane River;
- Aitcheson Street (no.101), Aitcheson Street(West), adjoining Brisbane River;
- Sheldrake Place & Weekes Road;
- Ellerby Road, adjoining Brisbane River;
- Livesay Road, Beaufort Crescent and Forestwood and Livesay Roads;
- Moggill Road (no.3777), Aitcheson Street and Moggill Road;
- Myora Street, Hawkesbury Road and Myora Street;
- Priors Pocket Road (no.301), Priors Pocket Road;
- Priors Pocket Road Park (No.545), adjoining Brisbane River and
- Stratford Street, Stratford and Avonmore Streets, on the Brisbane River.

The majority of land that sits between the adjoining Brisbane River and private properties is classified as Park Land (PK) by Brisbane City Council.
