= Moggill Ferry =

Coordinates: 27.5947°S 152.8566°E

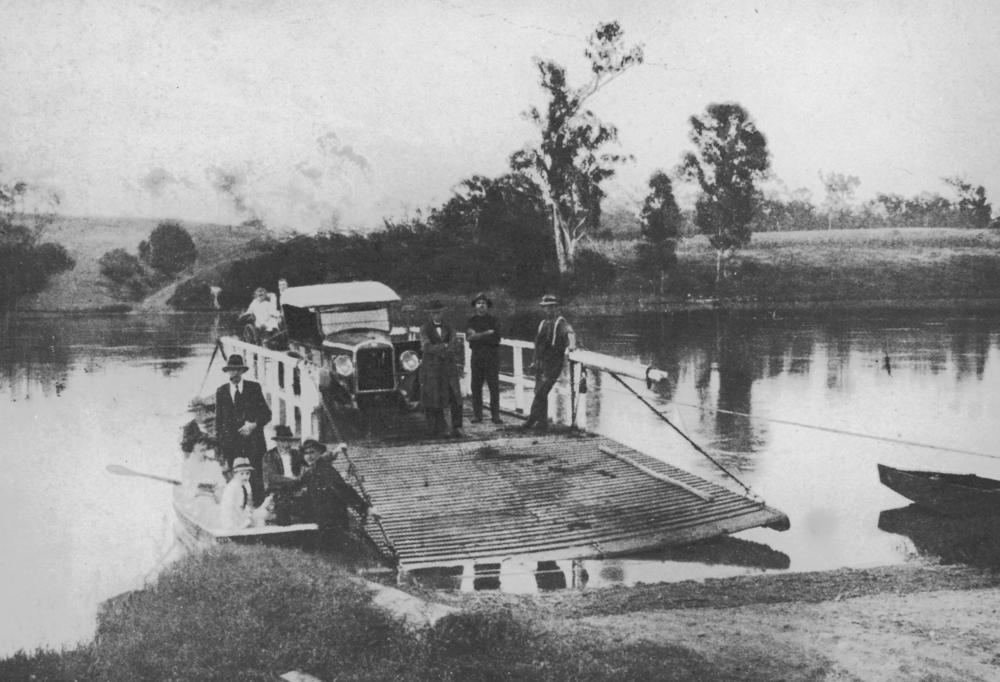
Moggill Ferry, 1928.

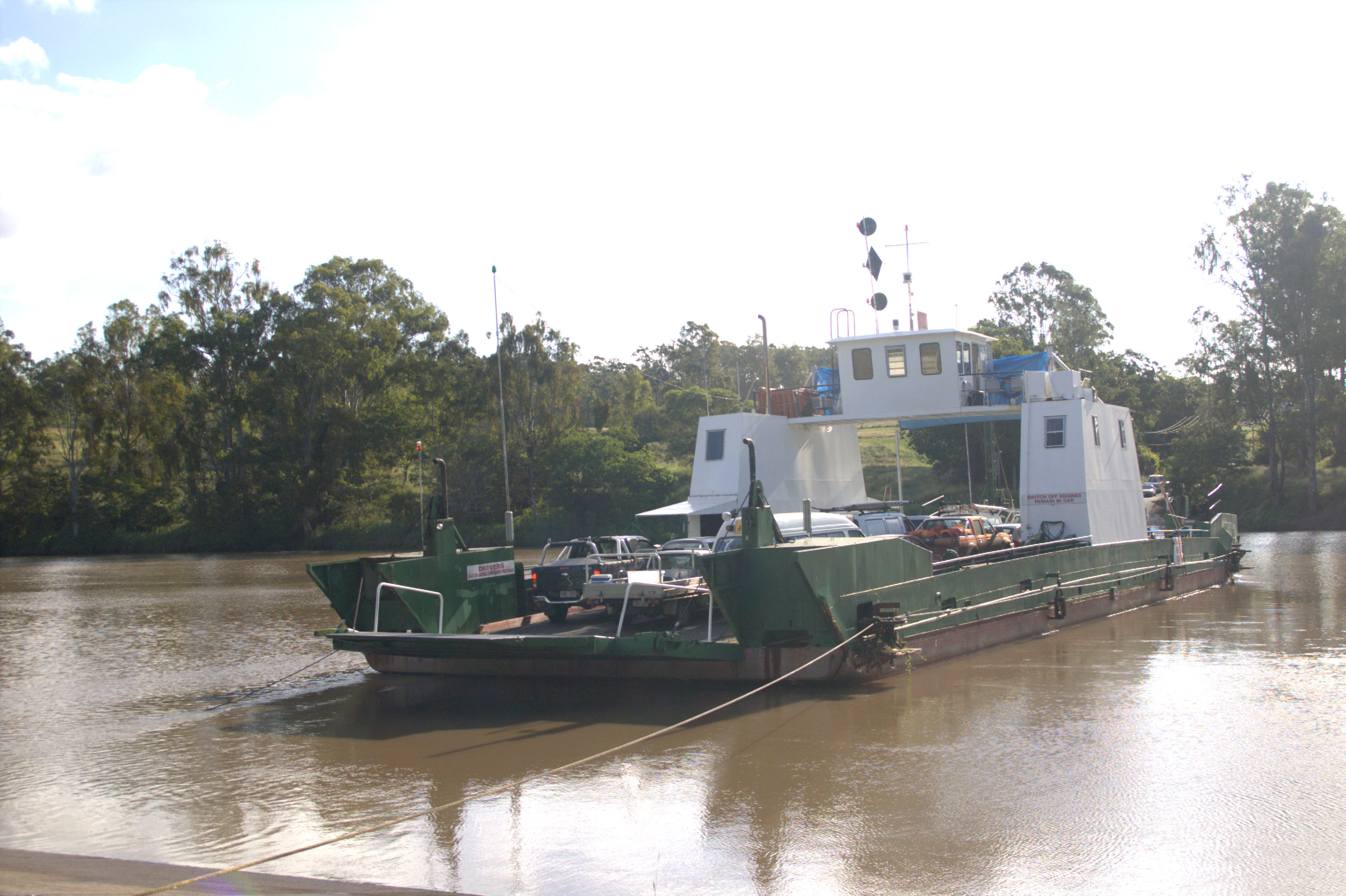
Moggill Ferry, 2008.

The Moggill Ferry is a cable ferry crossing the Brisbane River between the suburbs of Moggill in Brisbane and Riverview in Ipswich, both in Queensland, Australia. The iconic ferry is owned by Stradbroke Ferries and can carry up to 20 vehicles per crossing.

During floods the ferry is often out of service and alternative routes need to be taken by motorists. The ferry is guided across the river by a steel cable which can sometimes lead to boating accidents for the unwary.

== History ==
A ferry service began operations at the site in 1878 when Cobb & Co coaches provided service between Ipswich and Brisbane.

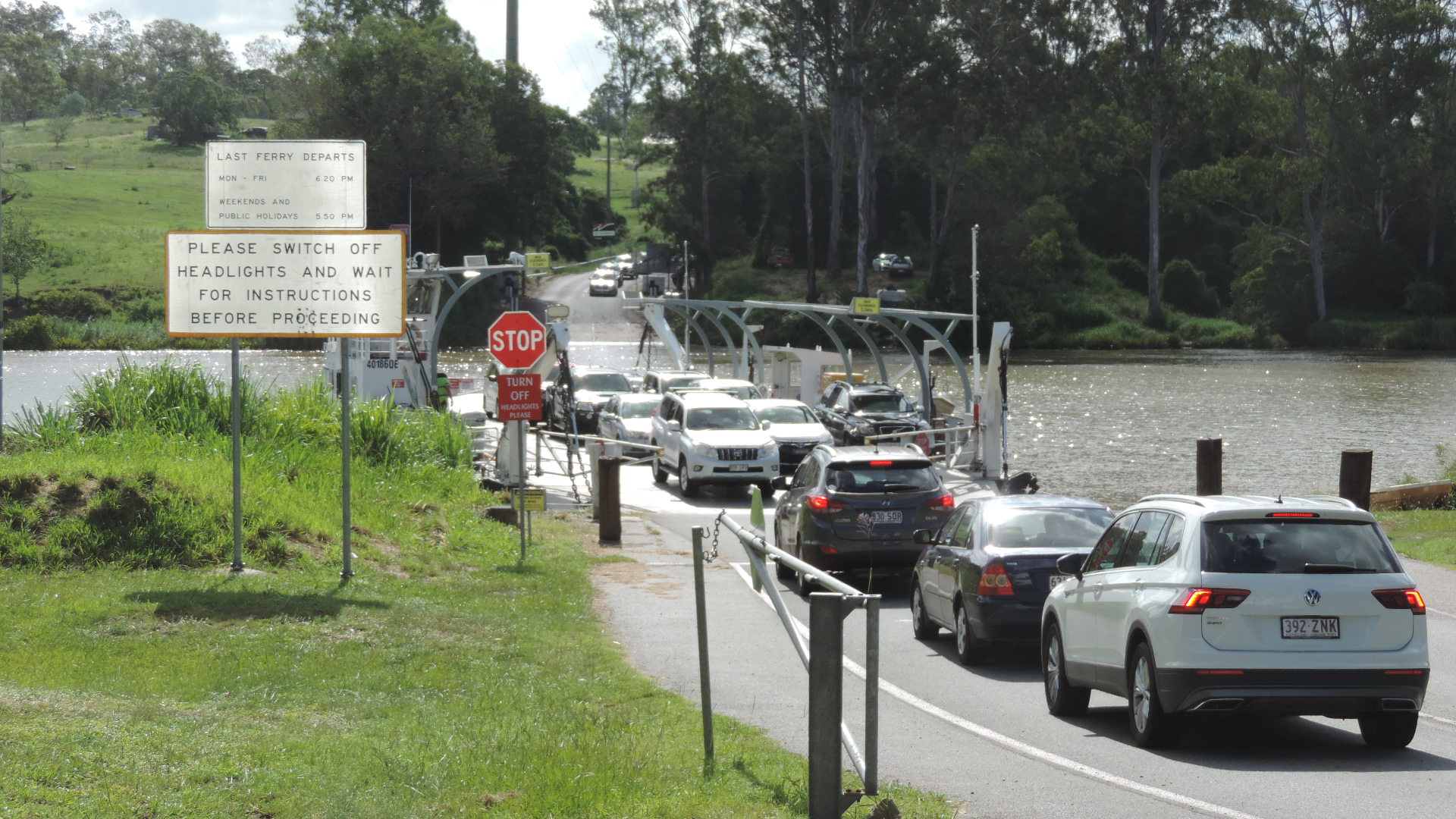
Cars disembarking into Moggill from the Moggill ferry while other cars (foreground) wait to board, 2021

During the 2010–2011 Queensland floods the ferry broke free from its cable guidelines. The suggestion to sink the wayward ferry was raised during the flood crises until the captain and former skipper managed to secure the vessel to the banks of the Brisbane River with ropes.

== See also ==
- Ferry transport in Queensland
- Kenmore Bypass
- Moggill Road
