= Bellbowrie =

- Suburb
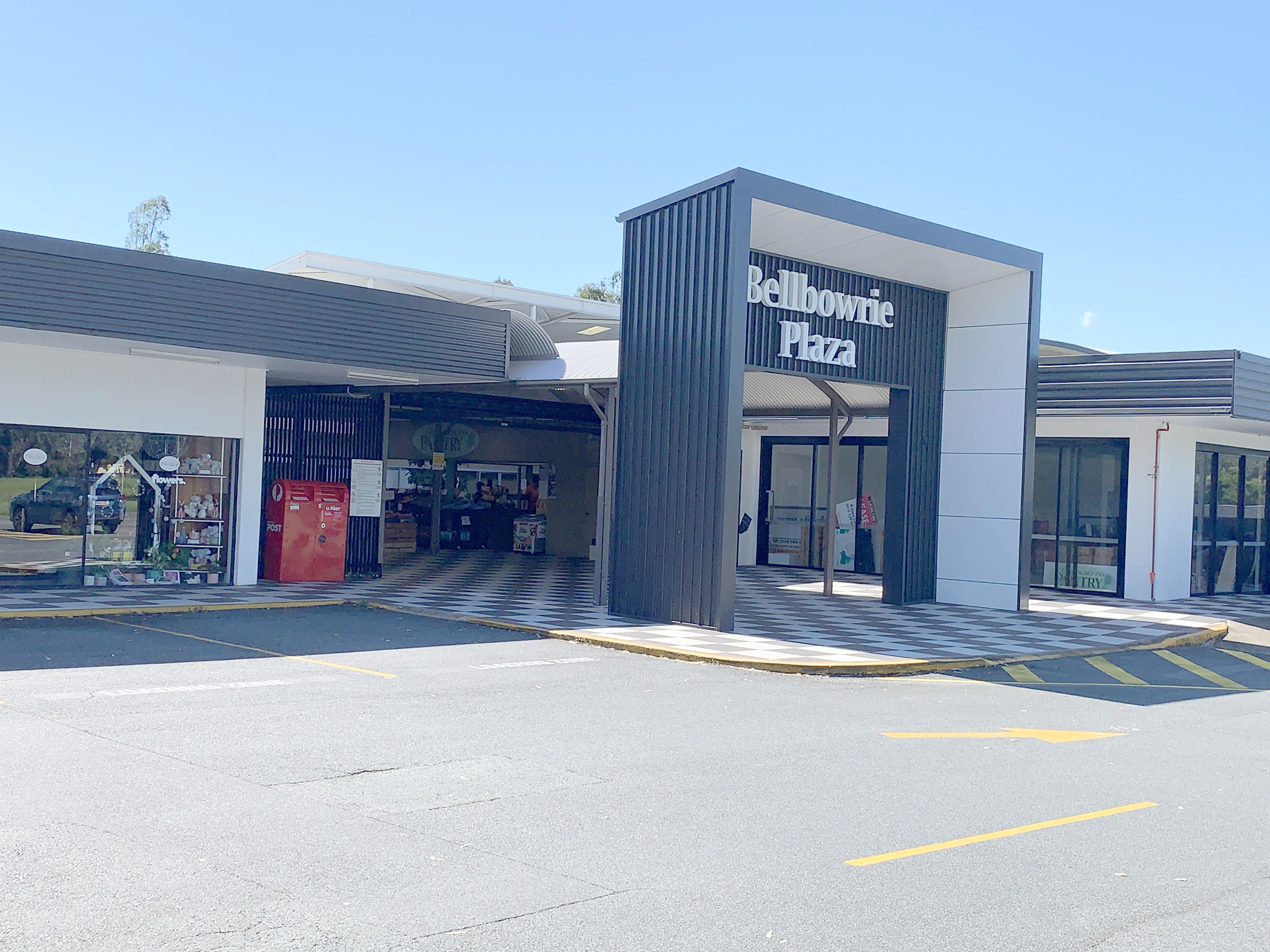
- Bellbowrie Plaza shopping centre, entrance, 2025

- Interactive map of Bellbowrie
- Coordinates: 27.5589°S 152.8824°E
- Country: Australia
- State: Queensland
- City: Brisbane
- LGA: City of Brisbane (Pullenvale Ward)
- Location: 21.8 km (13.5 mi) SW of Brisbane CBD

Government
  - State electorate: Moggill
  - Federal division: Ryan

Area
  - Total: 5.7 km^{2} (2.2 sq mi)

Population
  - Total: 5,495 (2021 census)
  - Density: 964/km^{2} (2,497/sq mi)
- Time zone: UTC+10:00 (AEST)
- Postcode: 4070
Suburbs around Bellbowrie
Anstead	Anstead	Pinjarra Hills; Westlake
Anstead	Bellbowrie	Riverhills
Moggill	Moggill	Moggill

Bellbowrie is a western riverside suburb in the City of Brisbane, Queensland, Australia. In the 2021 census, Bellbowrie had a population of 5,495 people.

Bellbowrie is on the northern side of the Brisbane River and lies 17 kilometres (11 mi) west-southwest of Brisbane's city centre. It is a rapidly developing semi-rural area due to Brisbane's growth heading in a westwards direction.

== Geography ==
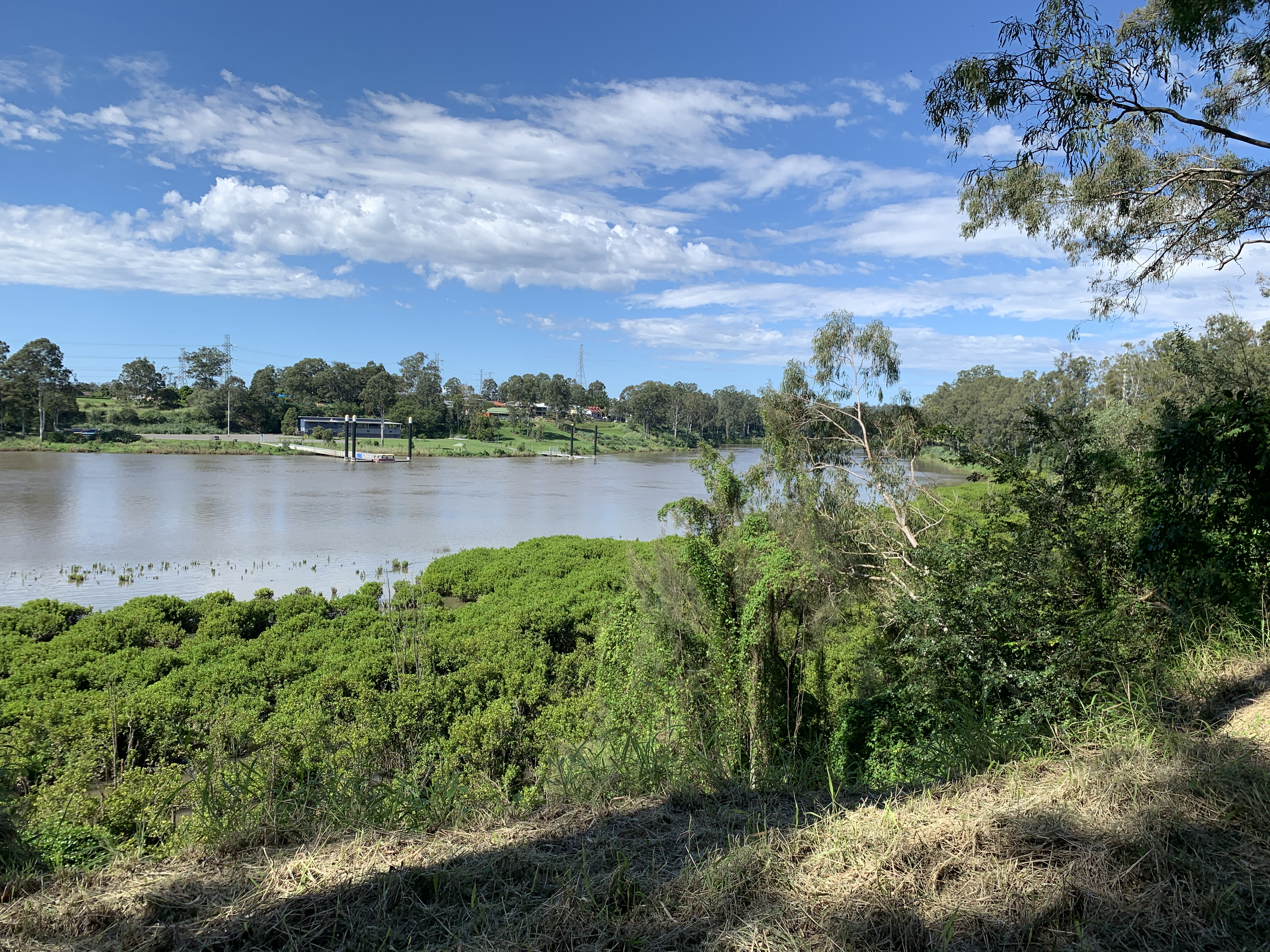
Looking across the Brisbane River from Bellbowrie, 2025

The suburb is bounded to the north by Pullen Pullen Creek and to the east by the Brisbane River with two of its reaches:

- Pullen Reach (downstream 27.5502°S 152.9038°E)
- Goggs Reach (upstream 27.5638°S 152.8969°E)

Moggill Road, which bisects the suburb, is a main thoroughfare for traffic passing from Ipswich to central Brisbane. Commuters may use the Moggill Ferry to gain access to Moggill Road as an alternative to the Centenary Highway. Neighbouring suburbs include: Moggill, Pinjarra Hills and Anstead.

The streetscape in Bellbowrie benefits from the provision of underground power and there are few power poles to be seen.

Bellbowrie is part of the Pullenvale Ward for Brisbane City Council Elections as well as the seat of Moggill for state elections and the seat of Ryan for federal elections.

== History ==
The name Bellbowrie is an Aboriginal word (possibly from the Hunter River area in New South Wales) meaning ''flowering gum'', possibly referring to the red gum. It was named on 4 November 1972 and bounded on 11 August 1975.

The Moggill bora ring is at 102 Riversleigh Road (27.5521°S 152.8819°E). It is a raised earthen mound about 300 millimetres (12 in) high and about 22 metres (72 ft) in diameter. It was used for ceremonies in which Aboriginal boys became recognised as men.

The Bellbowrie subdivision took place in 1972.

Development slowed in the aftermath of the 1974 Brisbane flood which saw much of the eastern, lower-lying areas of the suburb badly inundated with water. Since the construction of the Wivenhoe Dam in the 1980s the fear of floods was reduced and development increased. Many acreage owners are subdividing their properties and as a consequence, significant areas of bushland are being cleared.

The boundaries of the suburb were extended on 13 December 1990 to include land previously in Anstead.

The Bellbowrie Swimming Pool was built in 1974.

Several new housing estates began development in 2001 on land that used to be pineapple farms.

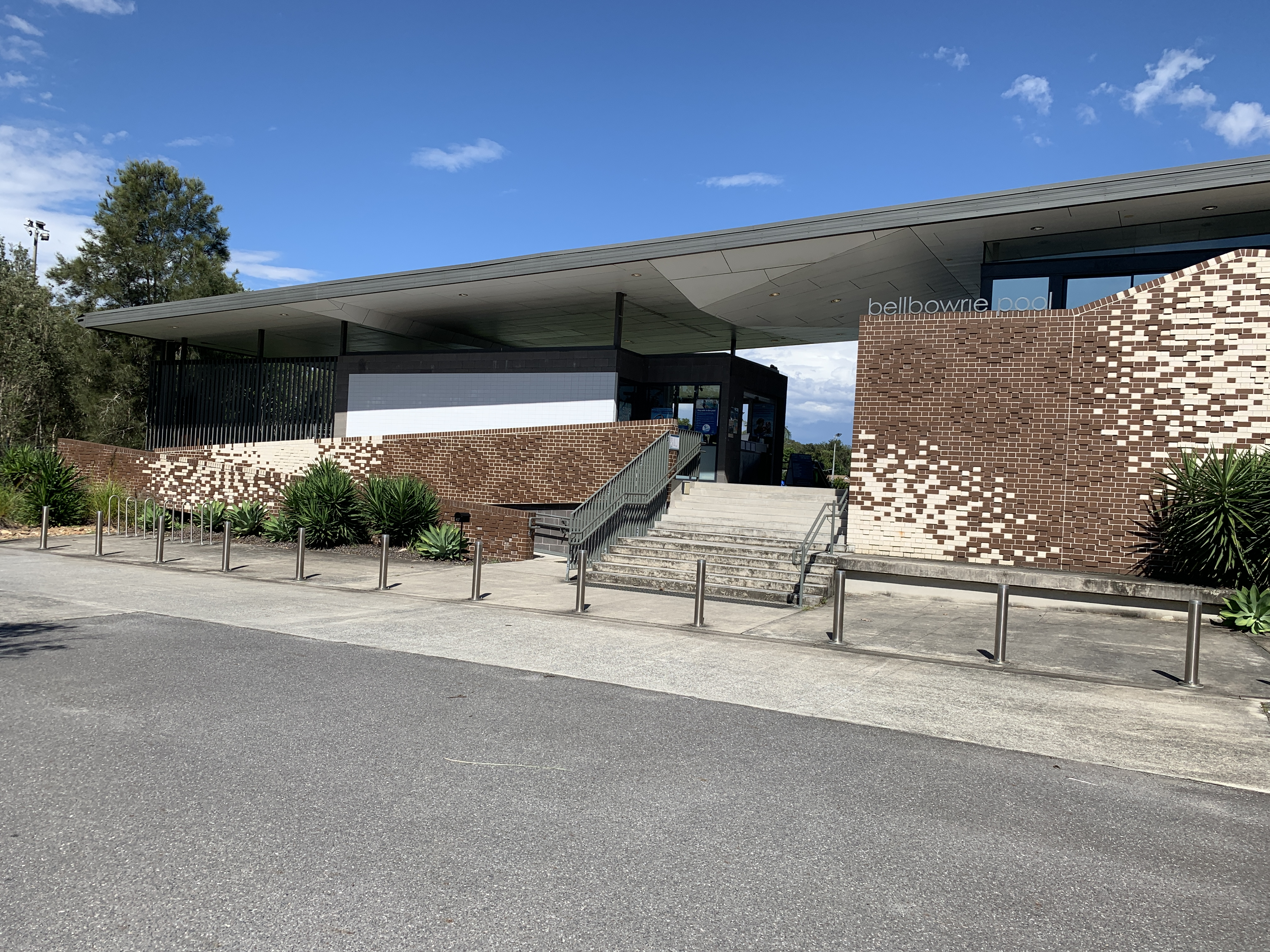
Award-winning clay brick rebuild of Bellbowrie swimming pool after the 2011 floods, 2025

In the 2011 Brisbane floods, the Brisbane River rose significantly and some small areas of Bellbowrie were flooded. However, of greater concern was the inundation of access roads to the area, isolating a number of suburbs including Bellbowrie including the loss of electricity and telecommunications and a shortage of food with the supermarket inundated. The Uniting Church acted as an evacuation centre for those whose homes were flooded and as a communal food bank which received supplies of necessities via helicopter.

Following the 2011 floods, the Bellbowrie swimming pool was rebuilt to be more flood-resistant based on a design by Bureau Proberts Architect. It won the Horbury Hunt Award, for the best commercial project utilising clay brick.

== Demographics ==
In the 2011 census, Bellbowrie had a population of 5,413 people.

In the 2016 census, Bellbowrie had a population of 5,462 people.

In the 2021 census, Bellbowrie had a population of 5,495 people.

== Education ==
There are no schools in Bellbowrie. The nearest government primary school is Moggill State School in neighbouring Moggill to the south. The nearest government secondary school in Kenmore State High School in Kenmore to the north-east.

== Amenities ==
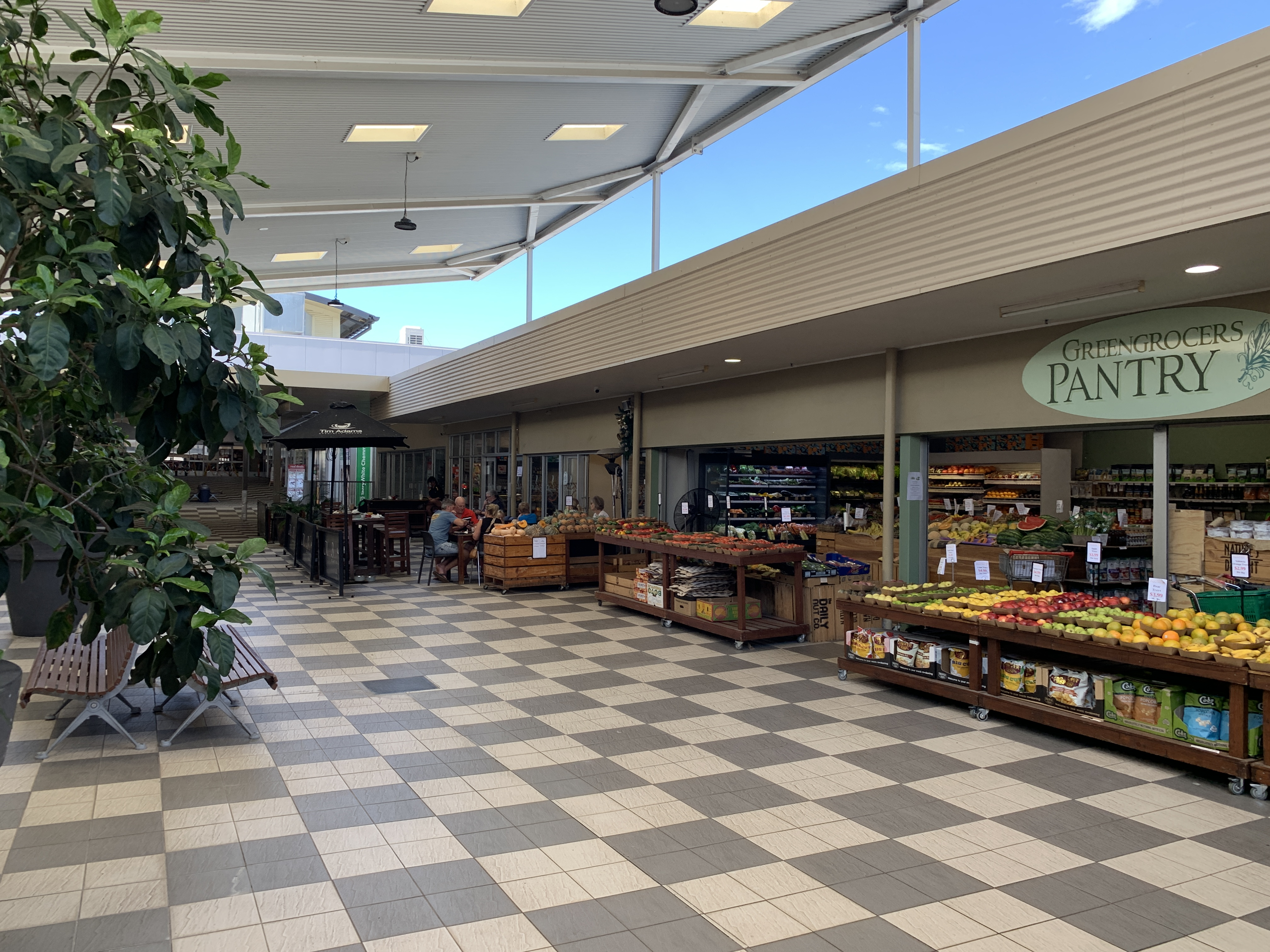
Inside Bellbowrie Plaza, cafe and fruit shop, 2025

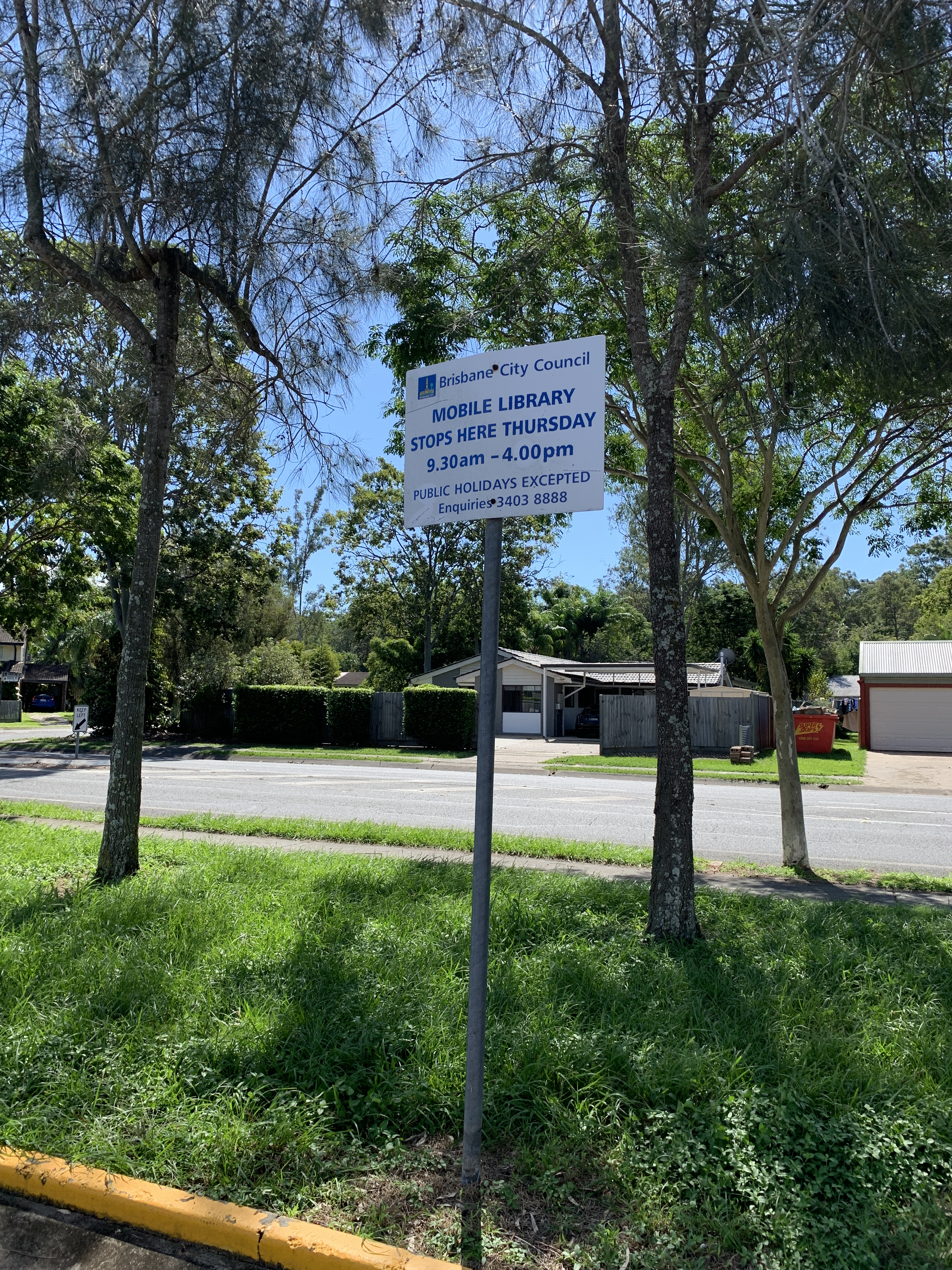
Mobile library location, 2025

Bellbowrie Tavern is on the south-east corner of Moggill Road and Birkin Road (27.5623°S 152.88712°E).

Bellbowrie Plaza shopping centre is in Birkin Road (27.5629°S 152.8884°E). The Brisbane City Council's mobile library service visits its carpark once a week.

Bellbowrie Community Church (formerly Kenmore Community Church) is at 3077 Moggill Road.

A number of community groups are active in the area, including:

- Rural Environmental Planning Association Inc.
- Rural Environmental Planning Association Inc.
- Moggill Girl Guides
- Moggill Scout Group

Bellbowrie has an off-leash areas for dogs to play in.

Bellbowrie is part of the Tyakunda Scout District, Tyakunda being an Aboriginal word meaning land of the rolling hills. The local Scout group is called "Moggill Scout Group", and is named so as Moggill was the original name of the area and meet at 17 Mahonia Street.

The Moggill branch of the Queensland Country Women's Association meets at the Bellbowrie Community Church at 3077 Moggill Road.

== Sporting clubs ==
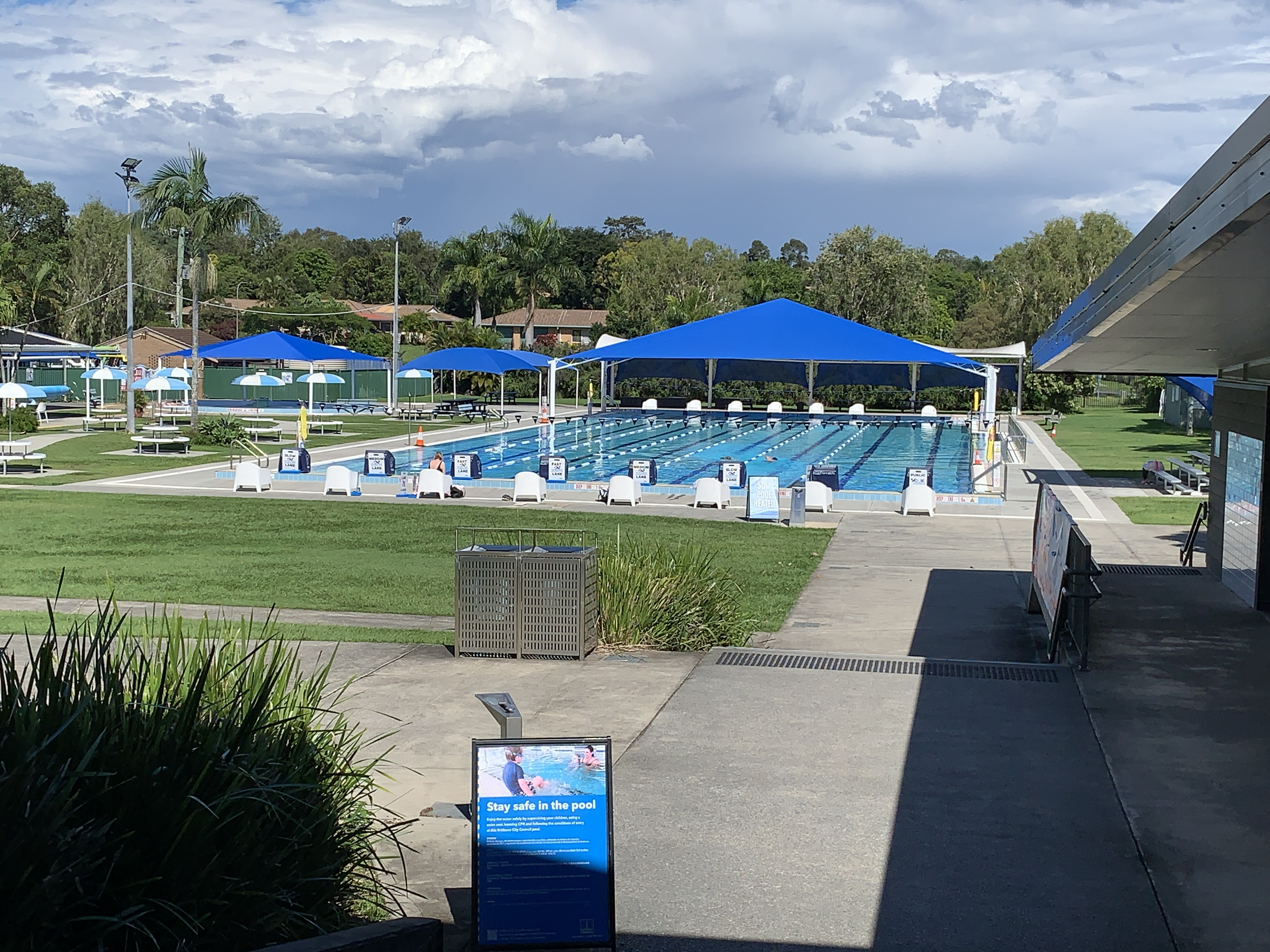
Bellbowrie swimming pool, 2025

The Bellbowrie Sports & Recreation Club Inc., known locally as the "sports & rec" or "the club", located in Sugarwood Street, is the home ground of several sporting clubs:

- Bellbowrie "Strikers" Hockey Club Inc.
- Moggill Football Club Inc.
- Moggill Cricket Club
- Moggill "Mustangs" Junior Australian Football Club.

Bellbowrie swimming pool is at 47 Birkin Road (27.5638°S 152.8898°E). It has an 8-lane 50-metre outdoor pool and a 25-metre heated covered pool. There is also a wading pool and water play area for children. The Bellbowrie Swimming Club trains there.

== Moggill Cemetery ==
Moggill Cemetery is located on the eastern side of Moggill Road, Bellbowrie in subdivision 2 of portions 7 & 8, County of Stanley, Parish of Moggill (27.5584°S 152.8894°E). In March 1851, the original land owner, Joseph Lewis, purchased portions 7 & 8. It is believed portions 7 & 8 was used as church graveyard, circa 1855, only clues remain as to the exact location of the associated, possibly Methodist, chapel. George Mounser, who accidentally drowned at Moggill on 4 March 1855, is assumed to have been the first person buried in the graveyard.

In 1865, the land was sanctioned as a cemetery. In June 1921, the Queensland Governor, Sir Matthew Nathan, ordered that the cemetery be permanently reserved and placed under the control of trustees: John Anstead, John Bird, Maurice William Doyle, Norman Charles Robert Sexton and Frederick Charles Sugars. In February 1922, the land was resumed by the Crown. In July 1930, the Governor, Sir Thomas Herbert Goodwin, passed control of Moggill Cemetery over to the Brisbane City Council).
