= Moggill Road =

Road in Brisbane, Australia

Moggill Road Queensland
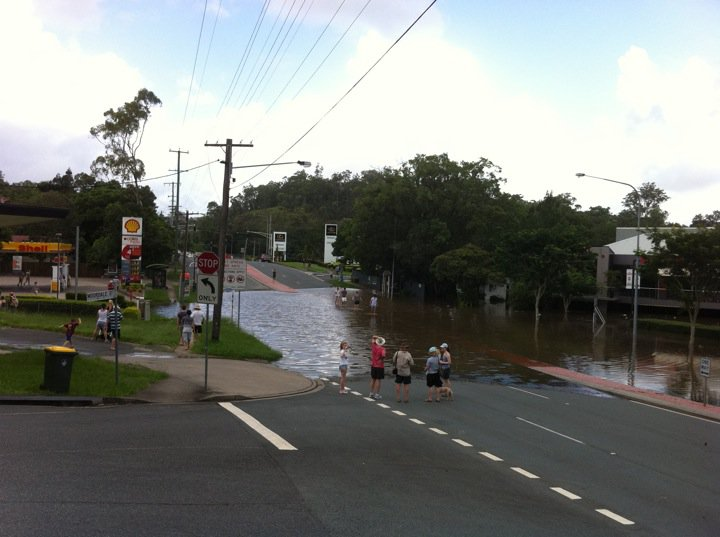
- Moggill Road flooding in Chapel Hill on 12 January 2011

General information
- Type: Road
- Length: 20.6 km (13 mi)
- Route number(s): State Route 33

Major junctions
- Moggill Ferry, Moggill
- High Street, Toowong

Moggill Road is a major road in Brisbane, Queensland, Australia. It commences at High Street at Toowong and terminates at the Moggill Ferry in Moggill. It is part of State Route 33. The road carried an average of 39,305 vehicles per day between July and December 2014.

It passes through the Brisbane suburbs of Toowong, Taringa, Indooroopilly, Chapel Hill, Kenmore, Pullenvale, Pinjarra Hills, Bellbowrie and Moggill.

It stretches 20.6 km (13 mi). $14 million worth of road works started in 2010, $32 million in 2009, following a further $27 million completed in 2008.

== History ==
The original Mogg-hill Road was a dirt track running from the convict settlement along the route known as Coronation Drive, through the village of Toowong and on to the ferry at Moggill. The track from Toowong to Moggil retained the name of Moggill Road. It was used by drays carrying timber to Patterson's sawmill which was initially located at Brookfield. Sometime during the 1890s the part of road along the Toowong Reach was renamed from Moggill Road to River Road.

== Flooding ==
During the 2010–2011 Queensland floods, Moggill Road flooded in a number of places, including:

- around the intersections with Market Street and Witton Road, Chapel Hill
- around Pullen Pullen Creek at Pinjarra Hills and Bellowrie

The flooding causes the suburbs of Bellbowrie, Moggill and Karana Downs to be cut off, leading to shortages of food and medical supplies.

== Upgrades ==
The construction of the Coonan Street overpass allowed for the free flow of traffic on Moggil Road.

=== Intersection upgrade ===
A project to upgrade the intersection with Brookfield Road, at a cost of $25 million, was in the planning stage in May 2022.

== Major intersections ==
The entire road is in the Brisbane local government area.

Location	km	mi	Destinations	Notes
Toowong	0	0.0	High Street (State Route 33) – north–east – Coronation Drive (State Route 33) and Benson Street (State Route 34) / Jephson Street (State Route 20) – north – Auchenflower / Burns Road – south – Taringa	Eastern end of Moggill Road (State Route 33); Eastern concurrency terminus with State Route 20
Taringa	0.75	0.47	Morrow Street (State Routes 20 and 33) – south–west – Moggill Road (westbound) / Beatrice Street – south – Indooroopilly and St Lucia (via Swann Road)	Moggill Road continues west with no route number
Taringa	1.1	0.68	Morrow Street (State Routes 20 and 33) – from north-east	Moggill Road continues west as State Routes 20 and 33
Taringa	1.3	0.81	Swann Road – south–east – St Lucia / Rokeby Terrace – north–west – Taringa	No exit from Moggill Road eastbound
Indooroopilly	1.9	1.2	Coonan Street (State Route 20) – south – Chelmer	Western concurrency terminus with State Route 20; Moggill Road continues west as State Route 33
Indooroopilly	3.3– 3.4	2.1– 2.1	Western Freeway (M5) – north – Toowong / south – Jindalee	No entry from Western Freeway northbound
Chapel Hill	4.1	2.5	Western Freeway exit road – from south – Jindalee	Entry from Western Freeway northbound. No exit.
Kenmore	6.2	3.9	Brookfield Road – north–west – Kenmore Hills	
Brookfield	8.2	5.1	Rafting Ground Road – north–west – Brookfield	
Brookfield–Pullenvale boundary	8.7	5.4	Pullenvale Road – west – Pullenvale	
Pinjarra Hills	13.2	8.2	Mount Crosby Road (State Route 37) – west – Anstead	
Moggill	20.6	12.8	Moggill Ferry Road (State Route 33) – west (via Moggill Ferry) — Riverview	Western end of Moggill Road; State Route 33 continues west and then south-east to Ipswich Motorway (M2).
1.000 mi = 1.609 km; 1.000 km = 0.621 mi: Concurrency terminus; Incomplete access

== Gallery ==
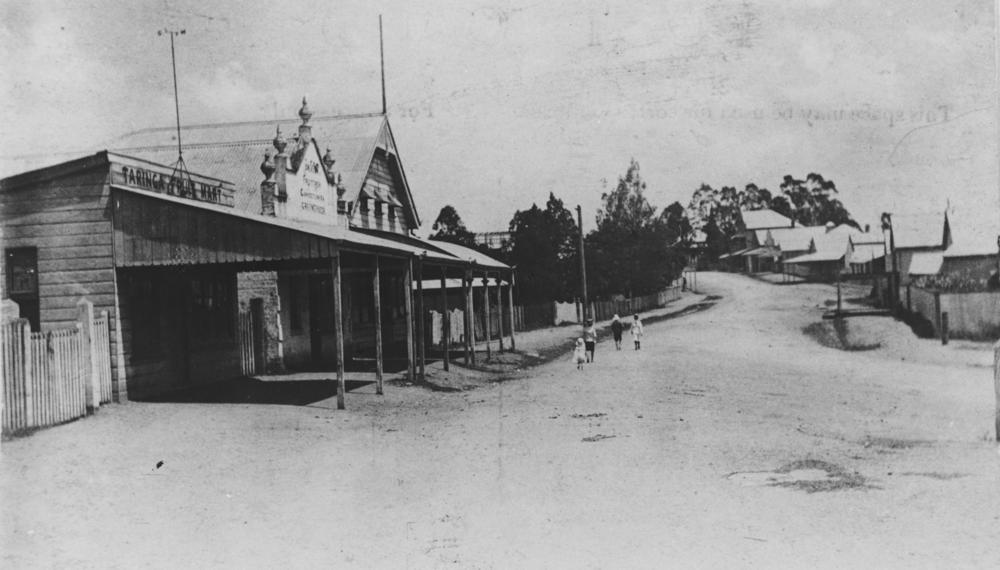
Moggill Road, Taringa, 1907

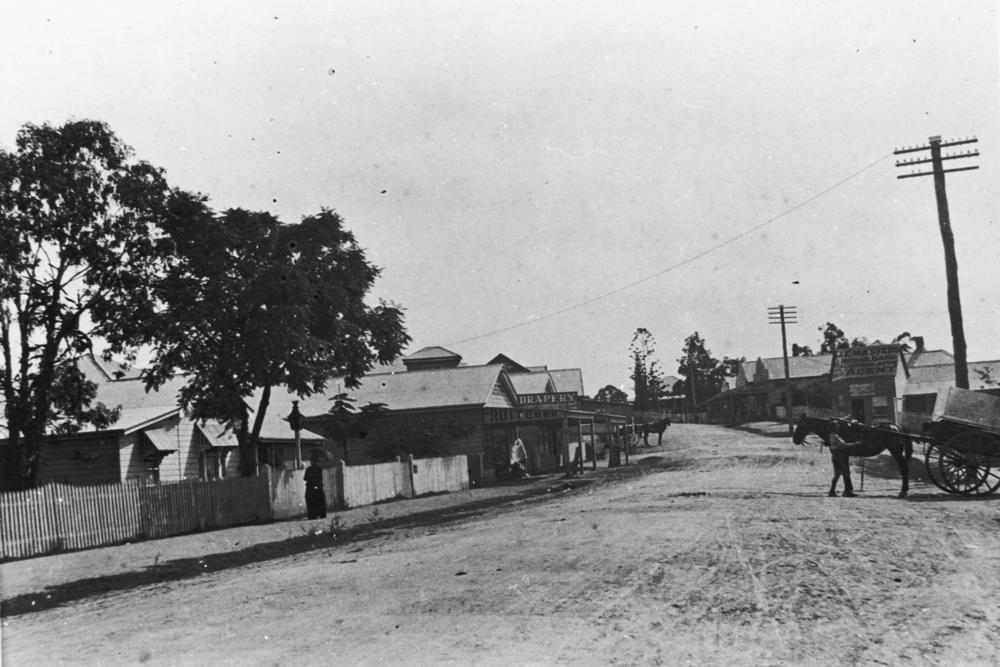
Moggill Road, Taringa, ca.1920

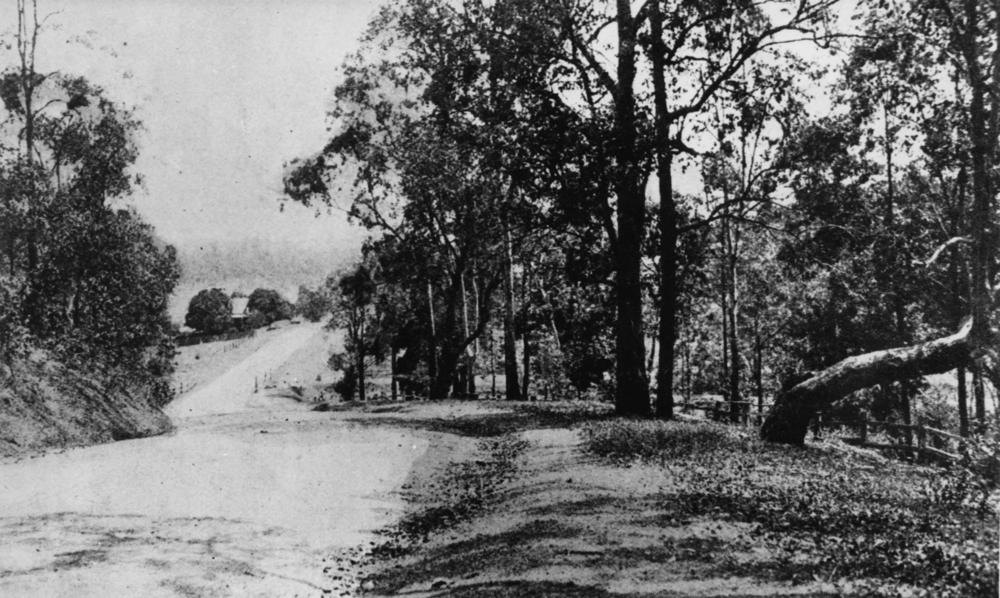
Moggill Road, Indooroopilly, 1921

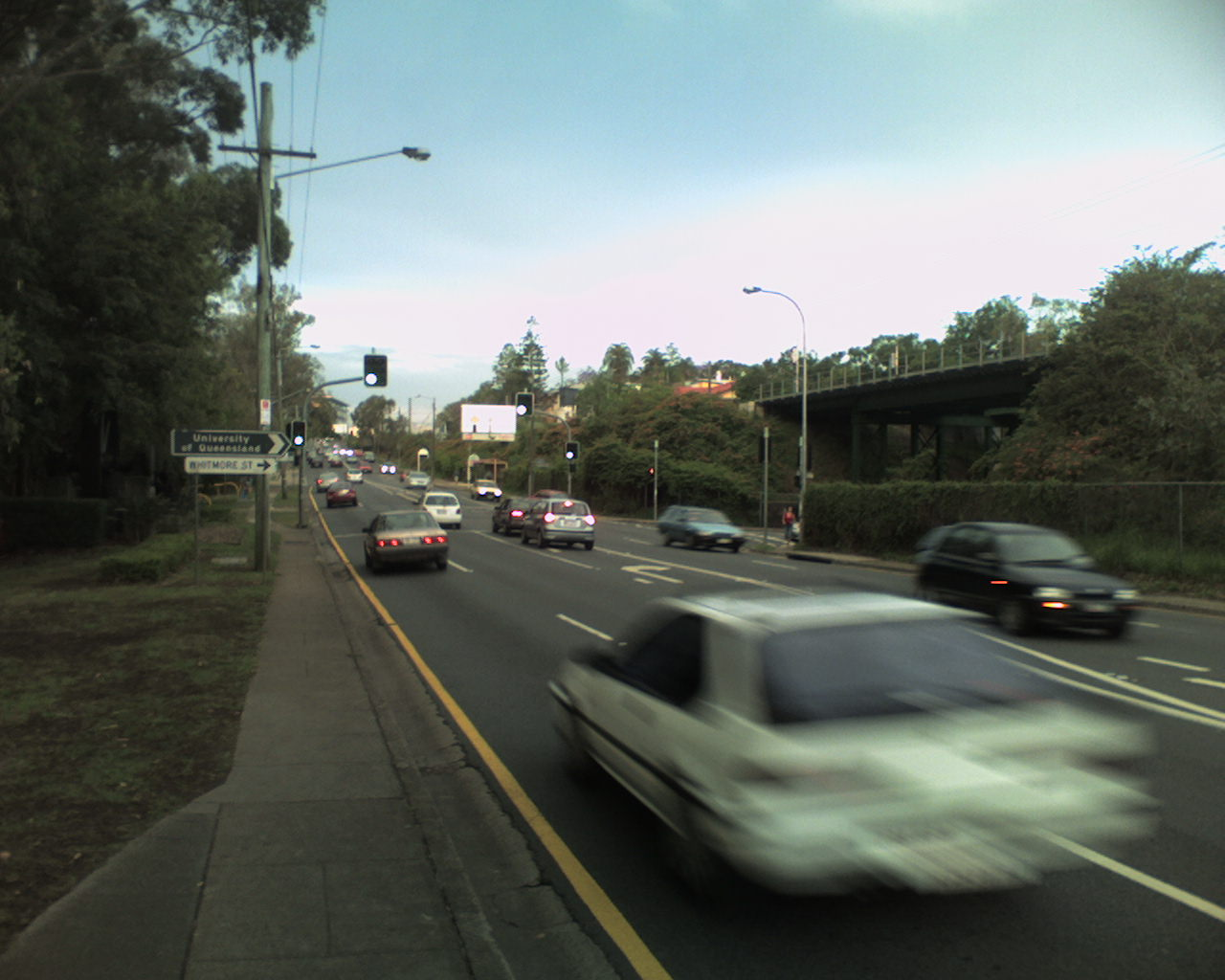
Moggill Road in Taringa, 2005

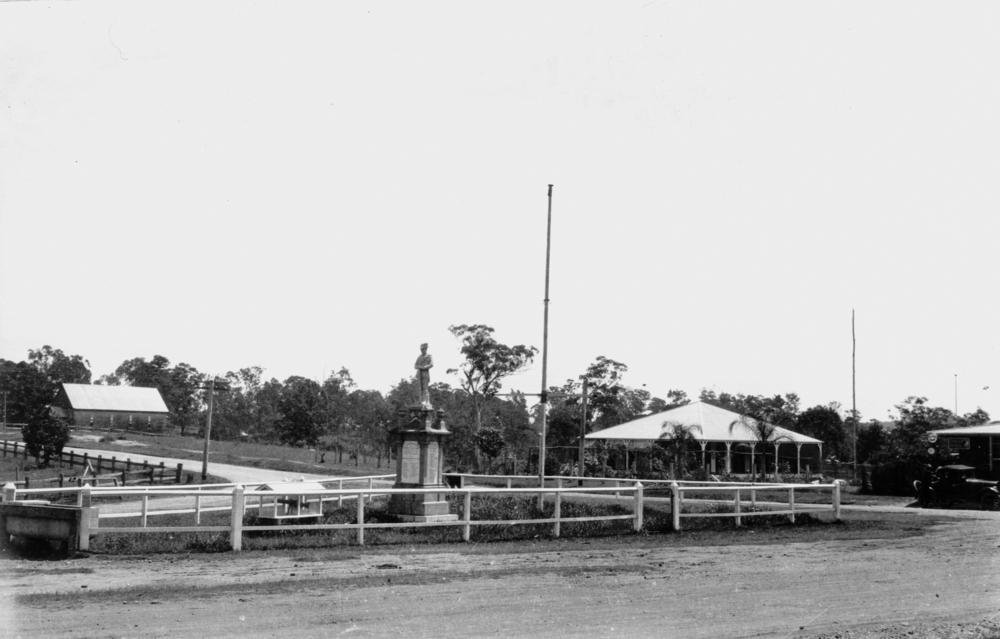
Moggill Road and Brookfield Road, Kenmore, 1925

== See also ==
- Kenmore Bypass
- Road transport in Brisbane
