= Barellan Point, Queensland =

Barellan Point
- Suburb
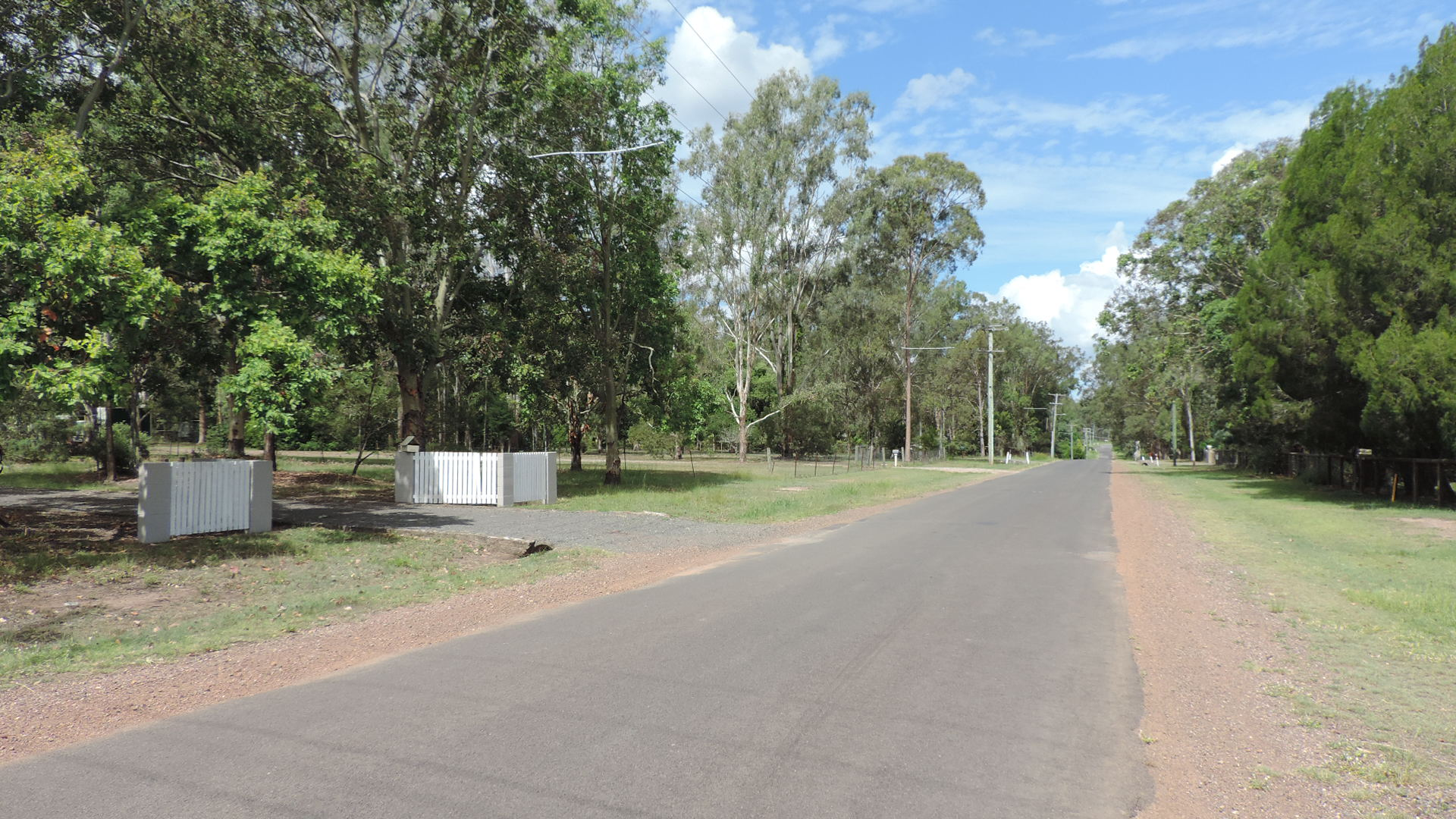
- Junction Road looking east from the intersection with Fifth Avenue, 2021

- Interactive map of Barellan Point
- Coordinates: 27.5713°S 152.8447°E
- Country: Australia
- State: Queensland
- City: Ipswich
- LGA: City of Ipswich
- Location: 13.3 km (8.3 mi) NE of Ipswich; 44.3 km (27.5 mi) SW of Brisbane

Government
  - State electorate: Ipswich West
  - Federal division: Blair

Area
  - Total: 3.6 km^{2} (1.4 sq mi)

Population
  - Total: 1,173 (2021 census)
  - Density: 326/km^{2} (844/sq mi)
- Time zone: UTC+10:00 (AEST)
- Postcode: 4306
Suburbs around Barellan Point
| Karalee | Karalee | Anstead |
| Karalee | Barellan Point | Moggill |
| Karalee | Riverview | Moggill |

Barellan Point is a rural residential suburb in the City of Ipswich, Queensland, Australia. In the 2021 census, Barellan Point had a population of 1,173 people.

== Geography ==
The suburb is bounded by the Brisbane River to the east and the Bremer River to the south. It includes two uninhabited islands in the Brisbane River:

- Bedwell Island, 3.2281-hectare (7.977-acre) island (27.5740°S 152.8523°E)
- Finlay Island, 3.2711-hectare (8.083-acre) island (27.5778°S 152.8536°E) but Findlay Island is now effectively attached to the mainland of Barellan Point

== History ==
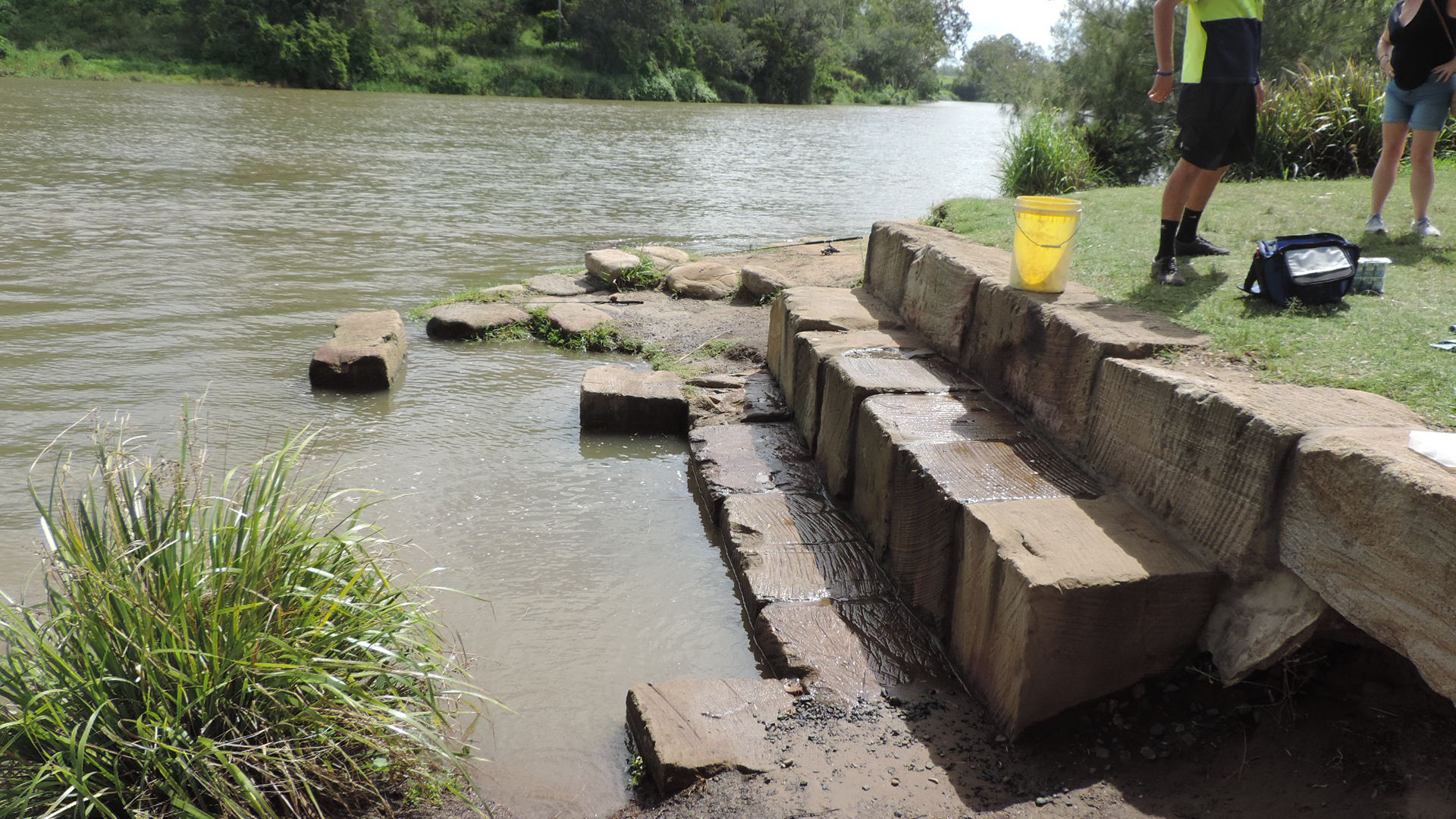
Looking up the Bremer River from the site of Joseph Brady's training wall

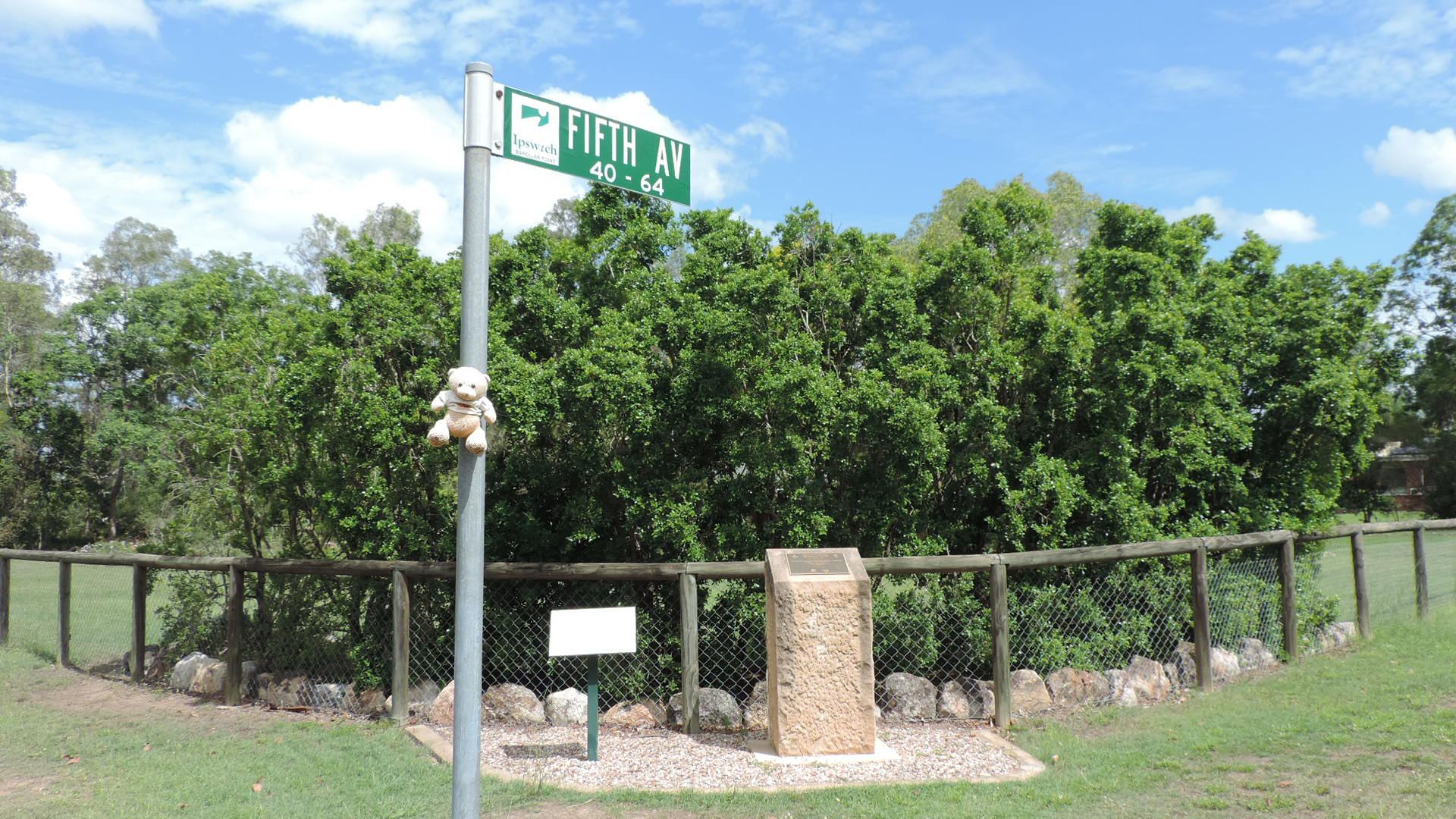
Barellan Point Landing Ground Memorial, 2021

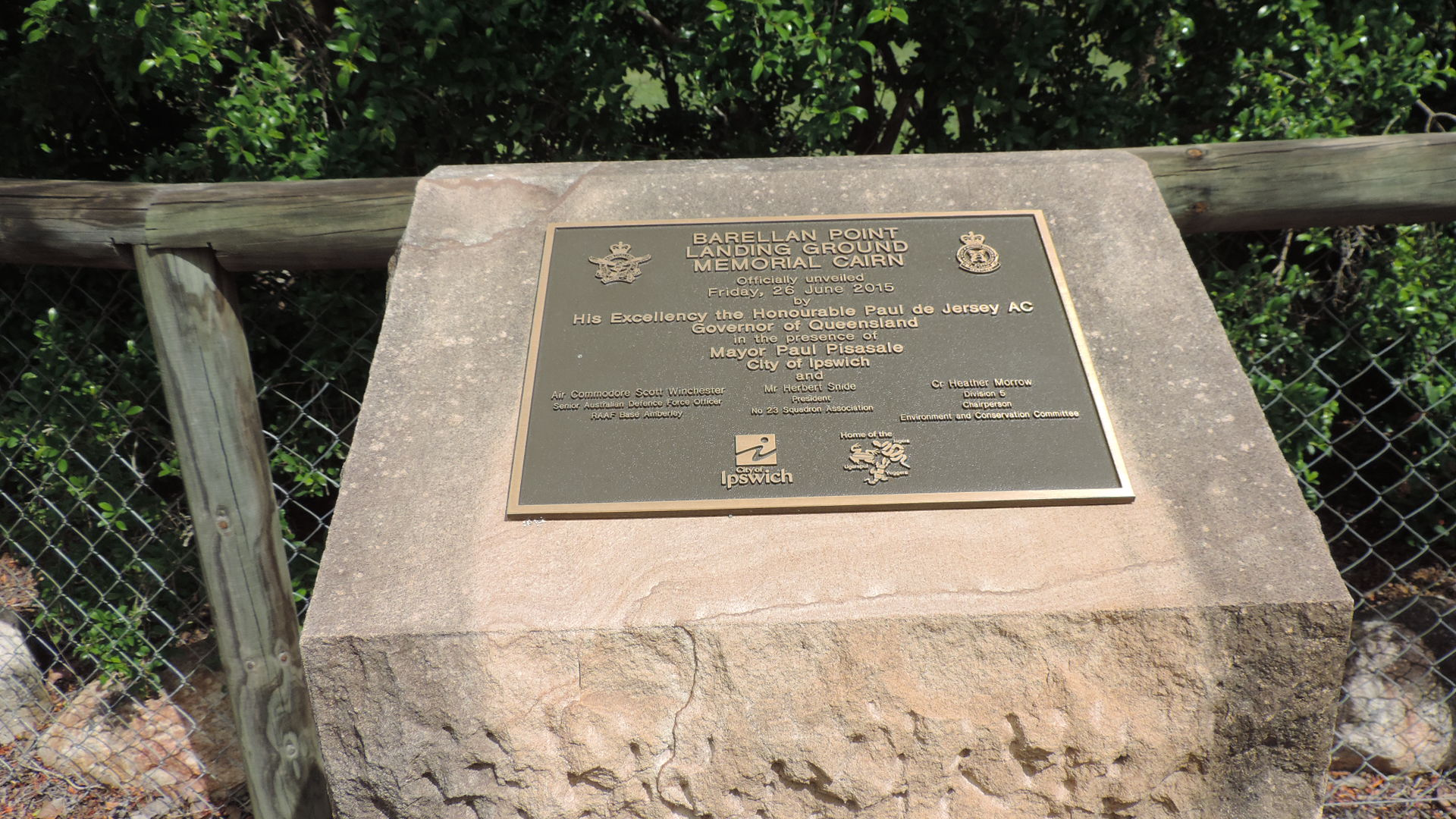
Barellan Point Landing Ground Memorial (close-up), 2021

In February 1864 John Petrie appointed Irish engineer Joseph Brady to provide advice and designs for the navigational improvements on the Brisbane and Bremer Rivers between Brisbane and Ipswich. This includes the construction of a training wall at the south-eastern corner of Barellan Point where the Bremer River flows into the Brisbane River to flow the channel to avoid the built-up of sandbanks.

During World War II, the Barellan Point Landing Ground was built on an elevated level site by RAAF Base Amberley. It was also known as the Bremer River Landing Ground and Riverview Landing Ground. Originally built for emergency landings, it was also used by RAAF No 23 Squadron as a training airfield and for their Moth Minor A21-7 operations. It was 3,000 by 200 feet (914 by 61 m) and went from present day Dampier Street to Fifth Avenue. After the war ended, the land reverted to its former use as farm land. A memorial and information board at the corner of Fifth Avenue and Junction Road (27.57396°S 152.84490°E) commemorate the landing ground. The memorial was officially unveiled on Friday 26 June 2015 by the Queensland Governor Paul de Jersey.

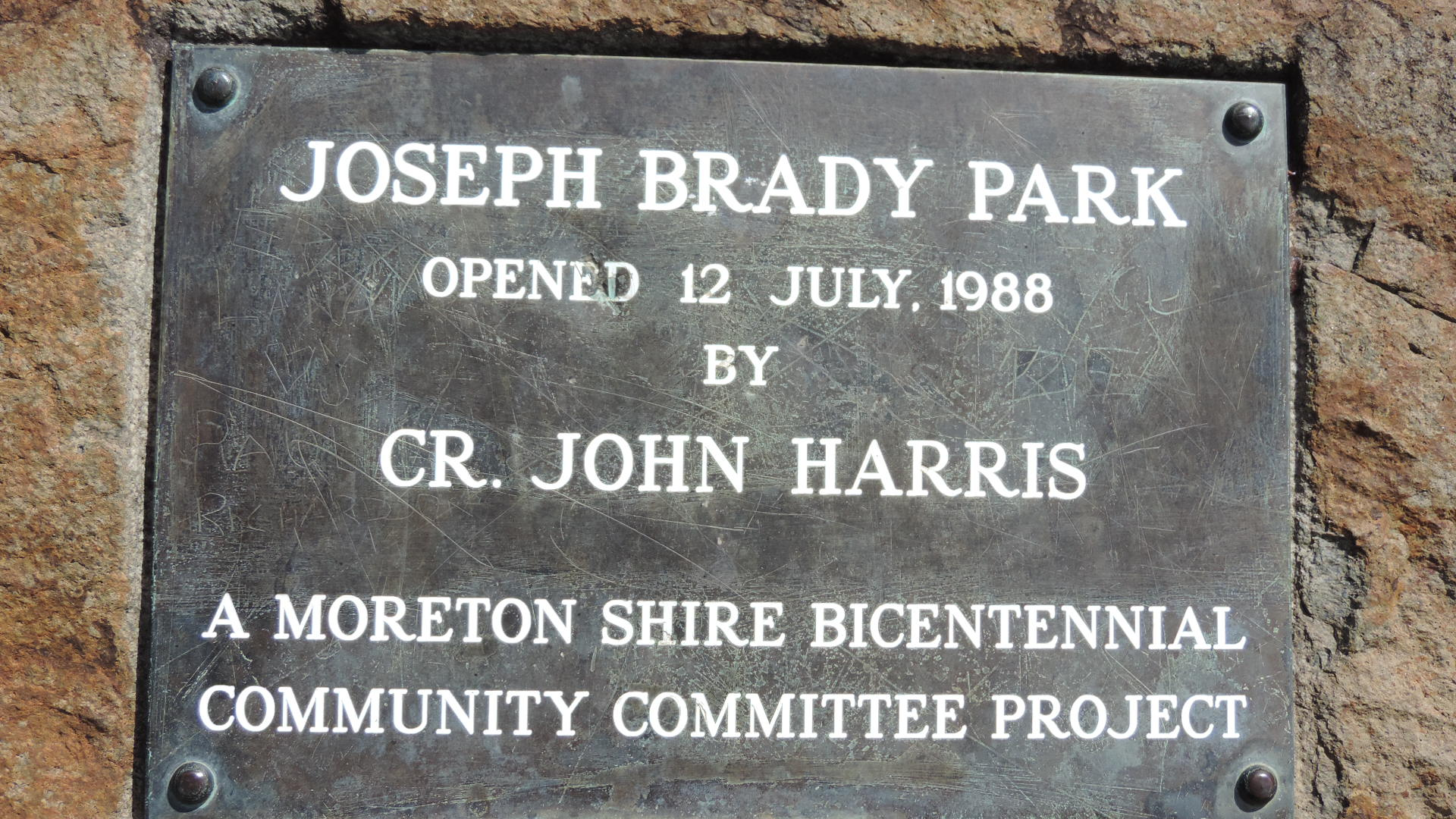
Commemorative plaque for the opening of Joseph Brady Park as part of the Australian Bicentenary celebrations

On 12 July 1988 the Moreton Shire Council officially opened Joseph Brady Park to commemorate Joseph Brady's engineering achievements at the site of one of his projects. It was a project undertaken as part of the Australian Bicentenary.

== Demographics ==
In the 2006 census, Barellan Point had a population of 1,178 people.

In the 2016 census Barellan Point had a population of 1,159 people.

In the 2021 census, Barellan Point had a population of 1,173 people.

== Amenities ==
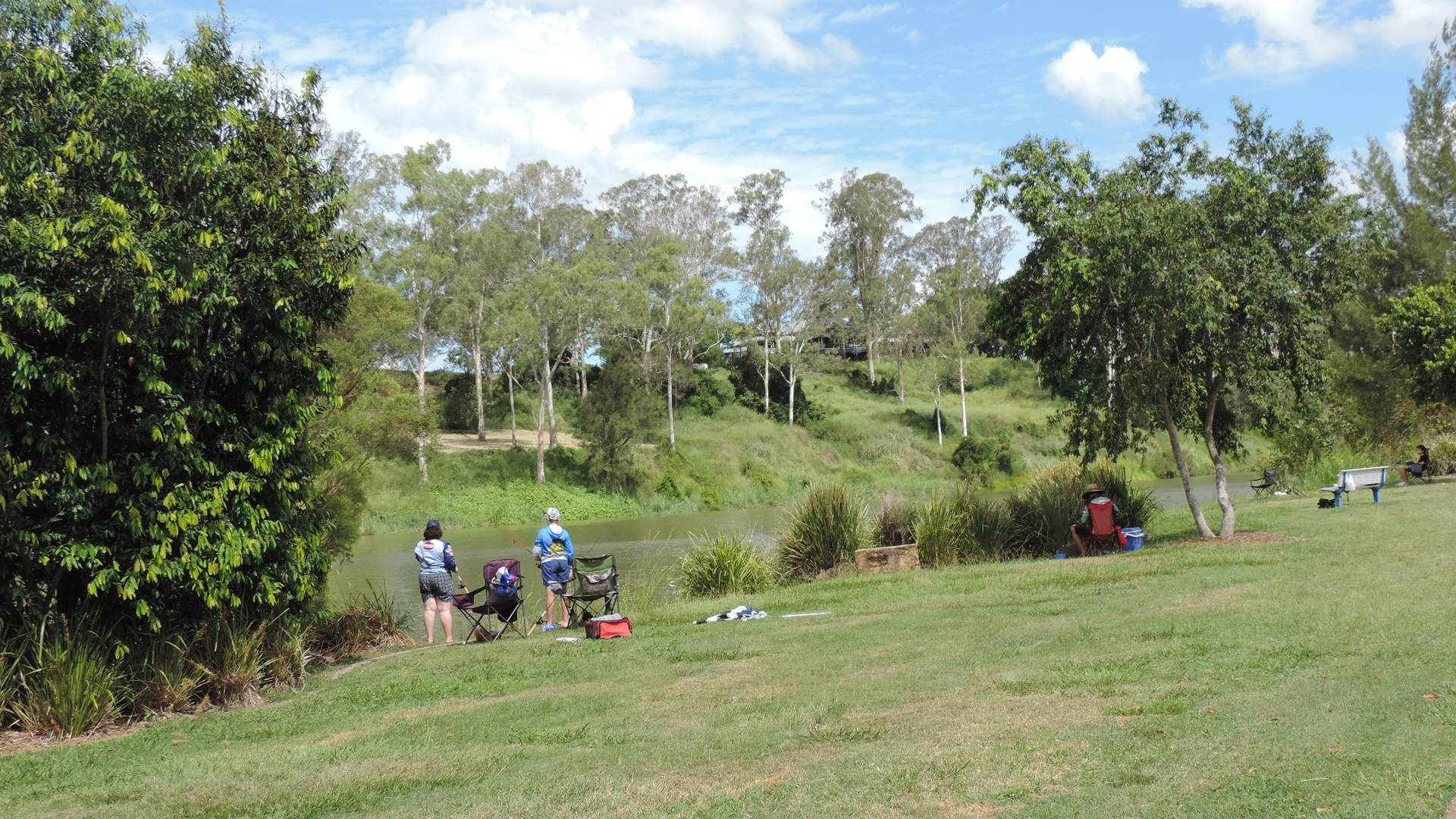
Fishing in the Brisbane River at Joseph Brady Park with Moggill on the other side of the river, 2021

There are a number of parks in the area:

- Faulkner Crescent Reserve (27.5683°S 152.8438°E)
- Findlay Park (27.5712°S 152.8498°E)
- Hallett Park (27.5648°S 152.8476°E)
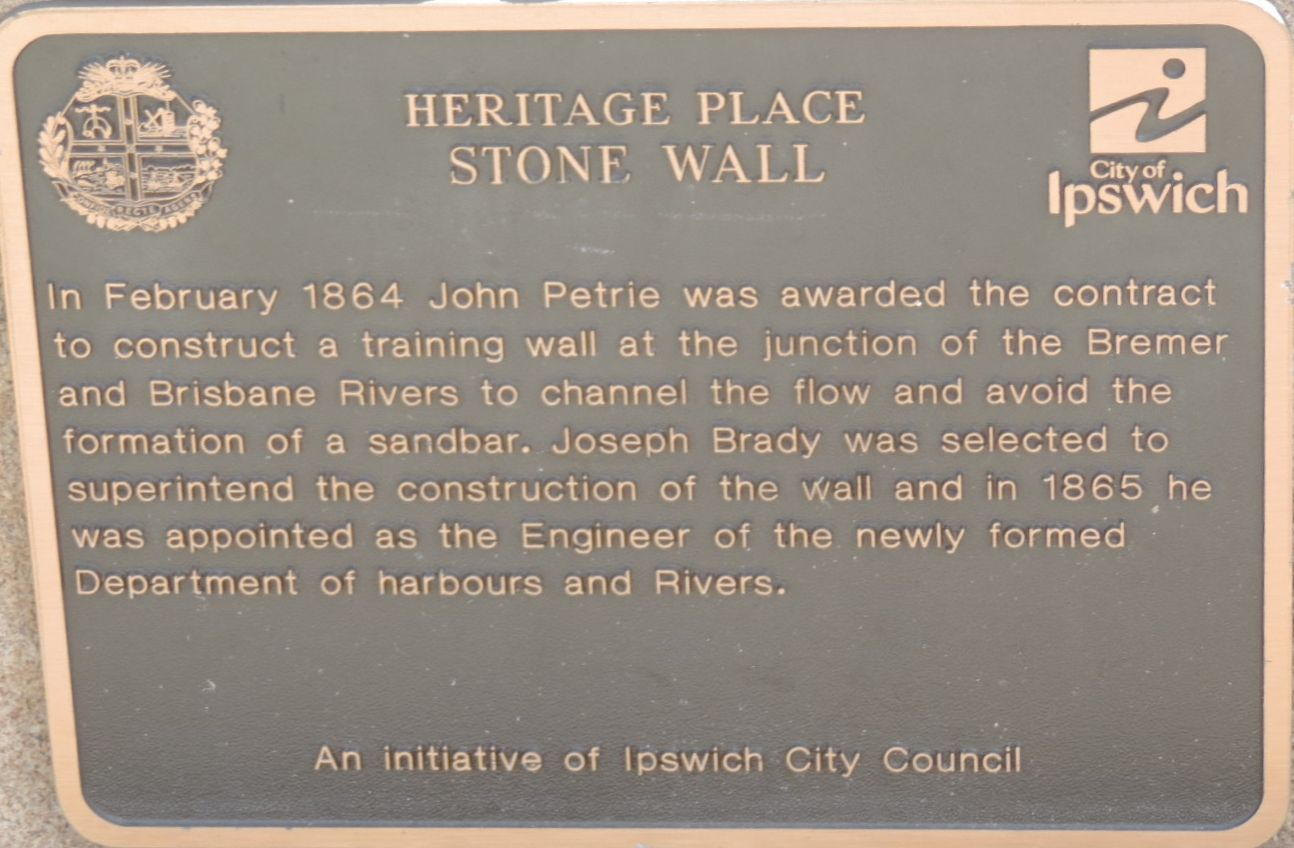
- Plaque in Joseph Brady Park commemorating his work at the confluence of the Bremer and Brisbane Rivers, 2021
  Joseph Brady Park at the confluence of the two rivers (27.5812°S 152.8535°E)
- Mitchell Street Reserve (27.5701°S 152.8446°E)
- Riverside Avenue Reserve (1260a) (27.5818°S 152.8508°E)
- Springdale Park (27.5660°S 152.8401°E)
- Third Avenue Reserve (27.5739°S 152.8402°E)
