= Riverview railway station =

Railway station in Queensland, Australia

Riverview
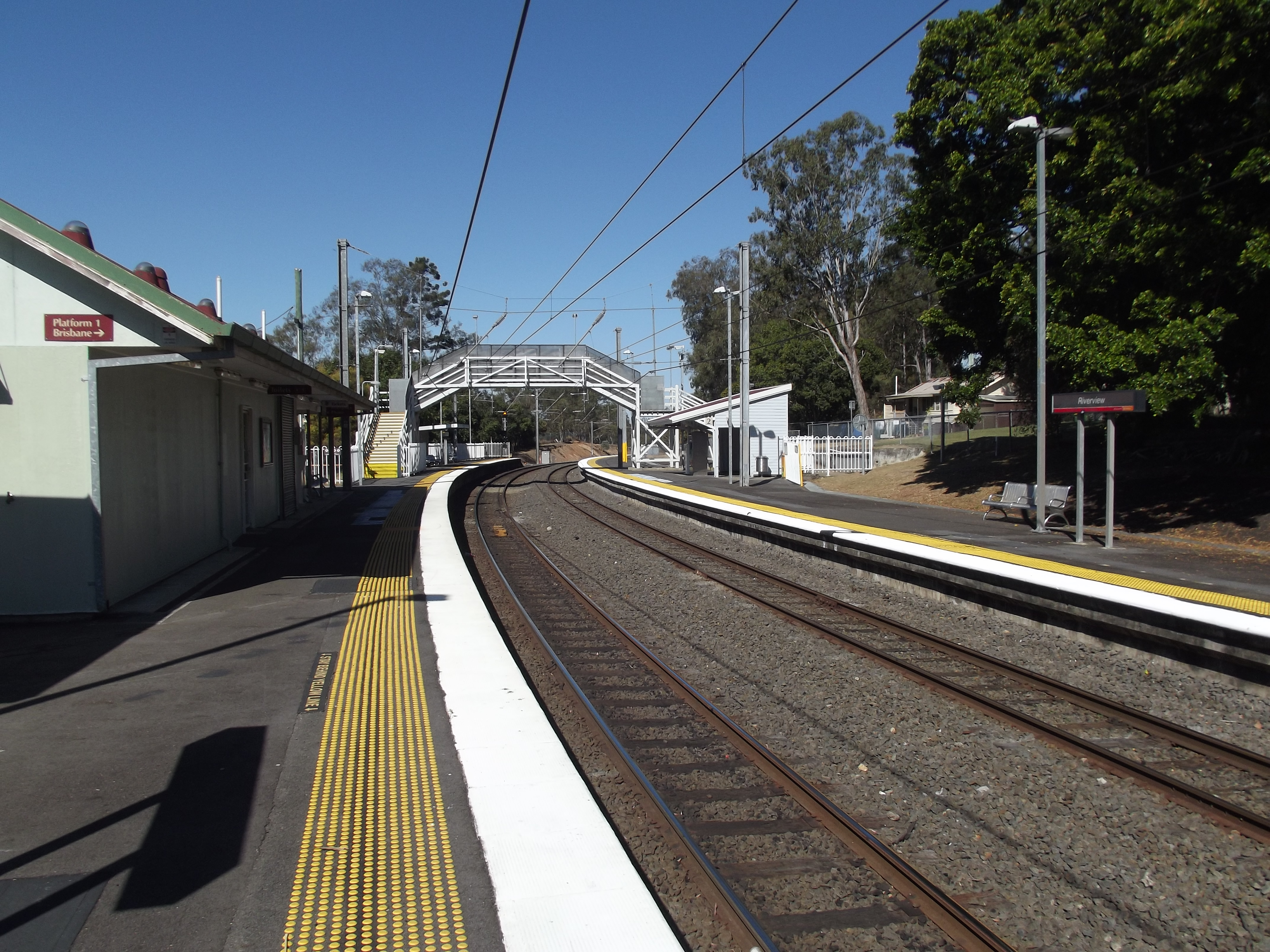
- Eastbound view in September 2012

General information
- Location: Moggill Ferry Road, Riverview
- Coordinates: 27.5949°S 152.8503°E
- Owner: Queensland Rail
- Operator: Queensland Rail
- Line: T1 Ipswich/Rosewood
- Distance: 29.16 kilometres from Central
- Platforms: 2 side
- Tracks: 2

Construction
- Structure type: Ground
- Parking: 63 bays

Other information
- Station code: 600335 (platform 1); 600336 (platform 2)
- Fare zone: Zone 3
- Website: Translink

History
- Opened: 1875; 151 years ago

Services
| Preceding station | Queensland Rail | Following station |
|---|---|---|
| Redbank towards Caboolture via Roma Street | T1 Ipswich/Rosewood line | Dinmore towards Ipswich or Rosewood |
Location

Riverview is a railway station operated by Queensland Rail on the Ipswich/Rosewood line. It opened in 1875 and serves the Ipswich suburb of Riverview. It is a ground level station, featuring two side platforms.

== Platforms and services ==
Riverview is served by trains operating to and from Ipswich and Rosewood. Most city-bound services run to Caboolture and Nambour, with some morning peak trains terminating at Bowen Hills. Some afternoon inbound services on weekdays run to Kippa-Ring. Riverview is fourteen minutes from Ipswich and 44 minutes on an all-stops train from Central.

Riverview platform arrangement
| Platform | Line | Destination | Notes |
|---|---|---|---|
| 1 | T1 Ipswich/Rosewood | Roma Street (to Caboolture and Nambour/Gympie North lines) | |
| 2 | T1 Ipswich/Rosewood | Ipswich or Rosewood | |
