= Riverview, Queensland =

Riverview
- Suburb
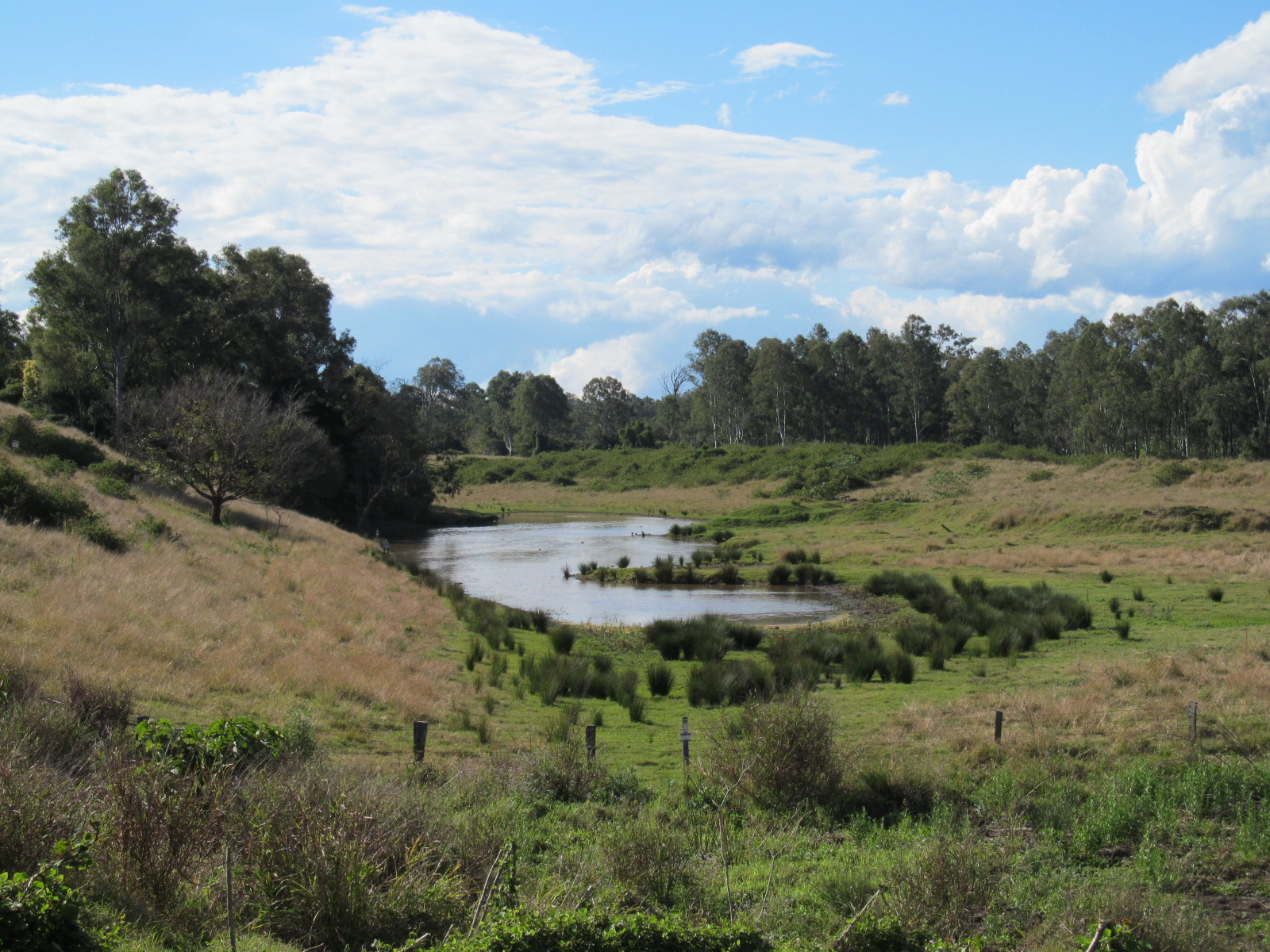
- Fields near Moggill Ferry, 2013

- Coordinates: 27.5927°S 152.8474°E
- Country: Australia
- State: Queensland
- City: Ipswich
- LGA: City of Ipswich
- Location: 10.7 km (6.6 mi) NE of Ipswich CBD; 31.2 km (19.4 mi) SW of Brisbane CBD

Government
  - State electorate: Bundamba
  - Federal division: Blair

Area
  - Total: 7.8 km^{2} (3.0 sq mi)

Population
  - Total: 3,067 (2021 census)
  - Density: 393.2/km^{2} (1,018/sq mi)
- Time zone: UTC+10:00 (AEST)
- Postcode: 4303
Suburbs around Riverview
| Karalee | Barellan Point | Moggill |
| Bundamba | Riverview | Redbank |
| Dinmore | New Chum | Collingwood Park |

Riverview is a suburb of Ipswich in the City of Ipswich, Queensland, Australia. In the 2021 census, Riverview had a population of 3,067 people.

== Geography ==
Riverview is approximately 31 kilometres (19 mi) from Brisbane CBD. It is bounded to the north-east by the Brisbane River.

The Ipswich Motorway passes through the suburb from east (Redbank) to south-west (Dinmore). The Riverview–Moggill Ferry Road (Riverview Road) runs from the Warrego Highway to Moggill Ferry Road (Moggill Sub–Arterial Road) within Riverview. River Road (Queensland) runs from the Warrego Highway in Riverview to the Cunningham Highway in Dinmore.

The Main Line railway from Brisbane to Ipswich and beyond also passes through the suburb from east (Redbank) to south-west (Dinmore) to the north of the motorway. The suburb is served by Riverview railway station on Station Road (27.5950°S 152.8506°E).

== History ==
The suburb takes its name from its railway station, which in turn was named for views of the Brisbane River from the railway station.

St. Andrew's Anglican church at 33 Brisbane Road (27.5977°S 152.8492°E) was dedicated on 14 April 1956 by Reverend Kestell Cornish, Rector Parish of Ipswich. Its closure was approved in September 1992.

St Peter Claver College opened on 5 August 1976.

Riverview State School opened on 24 January 1977.

== Demographics ==
In the 2016 census, Riverview had a population of 3,073 people.

In the 2021 census, Riverview had a population of 3,067 people.

== Transport ==
Riverview railway station provides access to regular Queensland Rail City network services to Brisbane CBD, Ipswich and Rosewood via Ipswich.

The Moggill Ferry is a vehicular ferry service across the Brisbane River from Moggill Road, Moggill in the City of Brisbane (27.5947°S 152.8572°E) to Moggill Ferry Road at Riverview (27.5948°S 152.8555°E). The ferry operates on an "on demand" basis and takes 3 minutes to cross.

== Education ==
Riverview State School is a government primary (Prep-6) school for boys and girls at 131 Old Ipswich Road (27.6032°S 152.8469°E). In 2018, the school had an enrolment of 289 students with 25 teachers (23 full-time equivalent) and 18 non-teaching staff (12 full-time equivalent). It includes a special education program.

St Peter Claver College is a Catholic secondary (7-12) school for boys and girls at 10 Old Ipswich Road (27.5993°S 152.8379°E). In 2018, the school had an enrolment of 967 students with 80 teachers (78 full-time equivalent) and 43 non-teaching staff (36 full-time equivalent).

The nearest government secondary schools are Bundamba State Secondary College in neighbouring Bundamba to the east and Redbank Plains State High School in Redbank Plains to the south.
