= Pinjarra Hills =

- Suburb
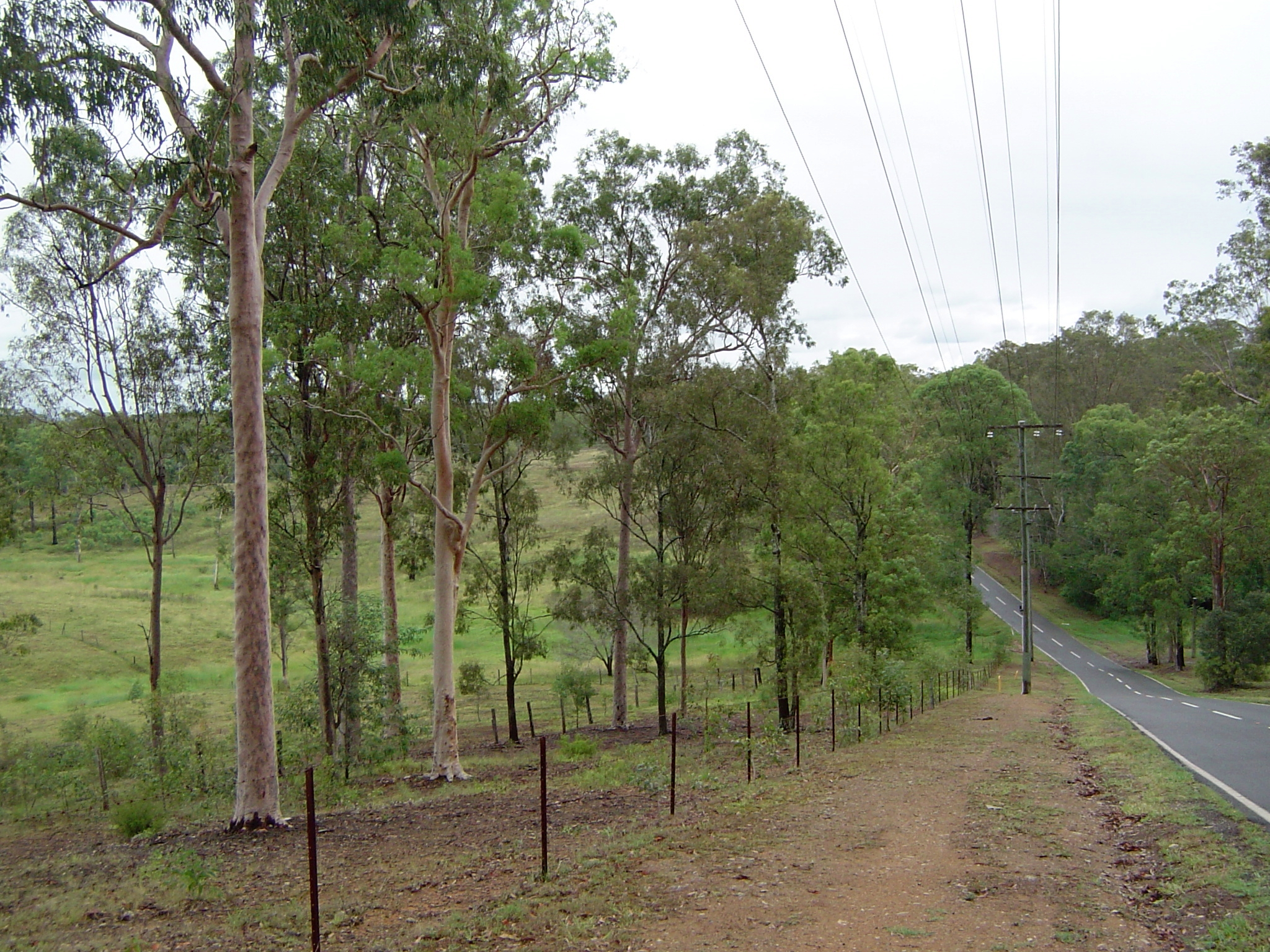
- University of Queensland paddocks

- Interactive map of Pinjarra Hills
- Coordinates: 27.5381°S 152.9060°E
- Country: Australia
- State: Queensland
- City: Brisbane
- LGA: City of Brisbane (Pullenvale Ward)
- Location: 16.8 km (10.4 mi) SW of Brisbane CBD

Government
  - State electorate: Moggill
  - Federal division: Ryan

Area
  - Total: 6.8 km^{2} (2.6 sq mi)

Population
  - Total: 771 (2021 census)
  - Density: 113.4/km^{2} (293.7/sq mi)
- Time zone: UTC+10:00 (AEST)
- Postcode: 4069
Suburbs around Pinjarra Hills
Pullenvale	Brookfield	Kenmore
Anstead	Pinjarra Hills	Jindalee
Bellbowrie	Westlake	Mount Ommaney

Pinjarra Hills is a riverside suburb in the City of Brisbane, Queensland, Australia. In the 2021 census, Pinjarra Hills had a population of 771 people.

== Geography ==
Pinjarra Hills is 16.8 kilometres (10.4 mi) by road south-west of the Brisbane central business district on the northern bank of the Brisbane River.

Most of the land between Pullenvale Road and the river (27.5369°S 152.9202°E) is the University of Queensland's Pinjarra Hills campus. The campus is a 282-hectare (700-acre) research facility.

Apart from the university camps, the suburb is rural residential.

Moggill Road is the main road route through the suburb. Mount Crosby Road enters from the southwest.

== History ==
The suburb was named after Pinjarra Road which travels through the suburb. However, the origin of the road name is unknown.

In the 1860s Patrick Mayne purchased the land now owned by the University of Queensland. Following the death of Patrick Mayne, it was inherited by his son William. In 1922 William's death resulted in his siblings Dr James O'Neil Mayne and his sister Miss Mary Emelia Mayne inheriting the land. In 1923 the Mayne siblings gave the land to the University of Queensland to enhance the teaching of agriculture. It was known as the Moggill Farm. However, circa 2000 when the university began to plan the relocation of its agriculture and veterinary disciplines to its new Gatton campus which had its own farm, the role of the Moggill Road became unclear. Rumours circulated that the university tended to sell the land for housing which attracted considerable protest. In 2008 the university denied having such plans, suggesting that the rumours arose from the idea being used as a student exercise in a master class, but did not disclose its plans for the site.

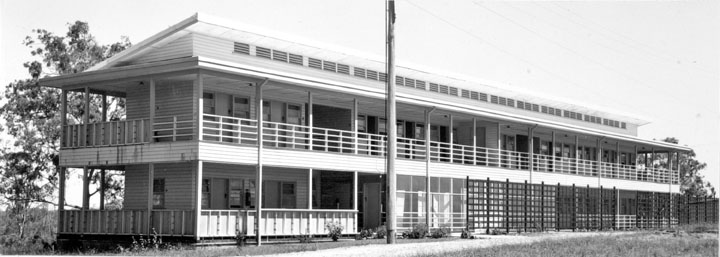
Kenmore tuberculosis sanatorium, 1946

In 1945, the Kenmore Tuberculosis Sanatorium officially opened at 2603 Moggill Road, having been constructed from 1943 to August 1944. After World War II, it was converted into a repatriation hospital. It closed on 24 April 1994 and was later demolished and replaced in 1998 with the Fairview War Veterans’ Home.

== Demographics ==
In the 2011 census, the population of Pinjarra Hills was 664, 54.5% female and 45.5% male. The median age of the Pinjarra Hills population was 55 years, 18 years above the Australian median. 68.1% of people living in Pinjarra Hills were born in Australia, compared to the national average of 69.8%; the next most common countries of birth were England 9%, South Africa 2.7%, New Zealand 2.1%, Malaysia 0.9%, Papua New Guinea 0.8%. 88.5% of people spoke only English at home; the next most common languages were 1.2% Cantonese, 0.9% Dutch, 0.5% German, 0.5% Swedish, 0.5% Danish.

In the 2016 census, Pinjarra Hills had a population of 606 people.

In the 2021 census, Pinjarra Hills had a population of 771 people.

== Education ==
There are no schools in Pinjarra Hills. The nearest government primary school is Pullenvale State School in neighbouring Pullenvale to the north-west. The nearest government secondary school is Kenmore State High School in Kenmore to the north-east.
