= Kenmore Bypass =

Proposed road in Queensland, Australia

The Kenmore Bypass is a proposed 3.3-kilometre (2.1 mi) arterial road in Brisbane, Australia, which would directly link Moggill Road in Pullenvale to the Centenary Motorway in Fig Tree Pocket. If constructed, the road would make use of a corridor that has been preserved since the 1960s. The bypass is Stage 1 of the planned Moggill Pocket Arterial Road.

== Moggill Pocket Arterial Road ==
The Kenmore Bypass is proposed as Stage 1 of the Moggill Pocket Arterial Road, also known as the Moggill—Warrego Highway Connection. The road is proposed to run from the Centenary Motorway in Fig Tree Pocket to the Warrego Highway in North Tivoli, via the suburbs of Kenmore, Pullenvale, Anstead and Karalee.

== Benefits ==
The proposed bypass is designed to alleviate congestion along Moggil Road during peak commuting hours.

The Kenmore Bypass Preliminary Feasibility Study concluded that a Kenmore Bypass would:

- Provide a 3 kilometres (1.9 mi) alternative road for the congested Moggill Road;
- Cater for an estimated 25,000 vehicles per day in 2026;
- Reduce rat running;
- Avoidance of two schools and two retail zones in Kenmore and 13 sets of traffic lights;
- Improve public transport on Moggill Road and
- Enhance bicycle commuting connectivity between the Kenmore and the Centenary Motorway cycleway.

== Planning process ==
The planning process, based on community feedback, looked at a range of options and more in-depth technical investigations.

=== Consultation ===
The Bypass has divided local residents and has been subject of extensive community planning to ensure the needs and opinions all residents are considered. The Kenmore Bypass Consultation report, that involved three stages and two additional interim consultation periods, received a total of 7,859 submissions between April 2008 and November 2009. The report highlighted the public issues regarding the Bypass, namely:

- Supportive of project (Stage 1) – 12.65%*
- Opposed to project (Stage 1) – 12.17%*
- Existing traffic issues: congestion – 7.22%
- Alternatives: Bellbowrie Bridge – 3.02%
- Public transport – 3%
- Moggill Road – 2.8%
- Future traffic issues: congestion – 2.49%
- Moggill Road intersection: travel in direction of Brisbane City – 2.07%
- Existing traffic issues: Public transport – 1.92%
- Environment: Loss of greenspace – 1.87%
- 'Other' issues accounted for 50.8% of the feedback received, including issues such as noise, land value and fauna.

=== Design ===
Design options have been published relating to:

- Moggill Road Intersection (options A & B),
- Gem Road to Kenmore Road and
- Centenary Motorway Interchange (options A & B and Fig Tree Pocket A & B).

== Current status ==
The decision to proceed with the Kenmore Bypass rests with the Government of Queensland whose responsibility it is to assess the affordability and priority of the project. Currently there is no decision or funding to build a Kenmore Bypass.

The Moggill Pocket Arterial Road corridor, as determined by the Western Brisbane Transport Network Investigation, will not be required under the land use projections in the South East Queensland Regional Plan, but remains as an important future corridor.

== See also ==
- Road transport in Brisbane
