= Pa Qaleh, Ilam =

Village in Ilam province, Iran

Pa Qaleh Persian: پاقلعه
- Village
- Location within Iran Location within Ilam Province
- Coordinates: 33°39′30″N 46°01′32″E
- Country: Iran
- Province: Ilam
- County: Chavar
- District: Buli
- Rural District: Chakor

Population (2016)
  - Total: 105
- Time zone: UTC+3:30 (IRST)

Pa Qaleh (Persian: پاقلعه) (Note: Also romanized as Pā Qal‘eh) is a village in, and the capital of, Chakor Rural District of Buli District, Chavar County, Ilam province, Iran.

== Demographics ==
=== Ethnicity ===
The village is populated by Kurds.

=== Population ===
At the time of the 2006 National Census, the village's population was 132 in 25 households, when it was in Buli Rural District of Chavar District (Note: Renamed the Central District of Chavar County) in Ilam County. The following census in 2011 counted 149 people in 37 households. The 2016 census measured the population of the village as 105 people in 30 households.

In 2019, the district was separated from the county in the establishment of Chavar County and renamed the Central District. The rural district was transferred to the new Buli District, and Pa Qaleh was transferred to Chakor Rural District created in the district.
