= Chaman-e Seyyed Mohammad =

Village in Ilam province, Iran

Chaman-e Seyyed Mohammad Persian: چمن سيدمحمد
- Village
- Location within Iran Location within Ilam Province
- Coordinates: 33°47′38″N 45°54′40″E
- Country: Iran
- Province: Ilam
- County: Chavar
- District: Buli
- Rural District: Buli

Population (2016)
  - Total: 123
- Time zone: UTC+3:30 (IRST)

Chaman-e Seyyed Mohammad (Persian: چمن سيدمحمد) (Note: Also romanized as Chaman-e Seyyed Moḩammad; also known as Mazār Saīyīd Mūhammad and Mazār-e Seyyed Moḩammad) is a village in, and the capital of, Buli Rural District of Buli District, Chavar County, Ilam province, Iran. The previous capital of the rural district was the village of Ganjevan.

== Demographics ==
=== Ethnicity ===
The village is populated by Kurds.

=== Population ===
At the time of the 2006 National Census, the village's population was 196 in 49 households, when it was in Chavar District (Note: Renamed the Central District of Chavar County) of Ilam County. The following census in 2011 counted 154 people in 40 households. The 2016 census measured the population of the village as 123 people in 33 households.

In 2019, the district was separated from the county in the establishment of Chavar County and renamed the Central District. The rural district was transferred to the new Buli District.
