= Kholo =

- Suburb
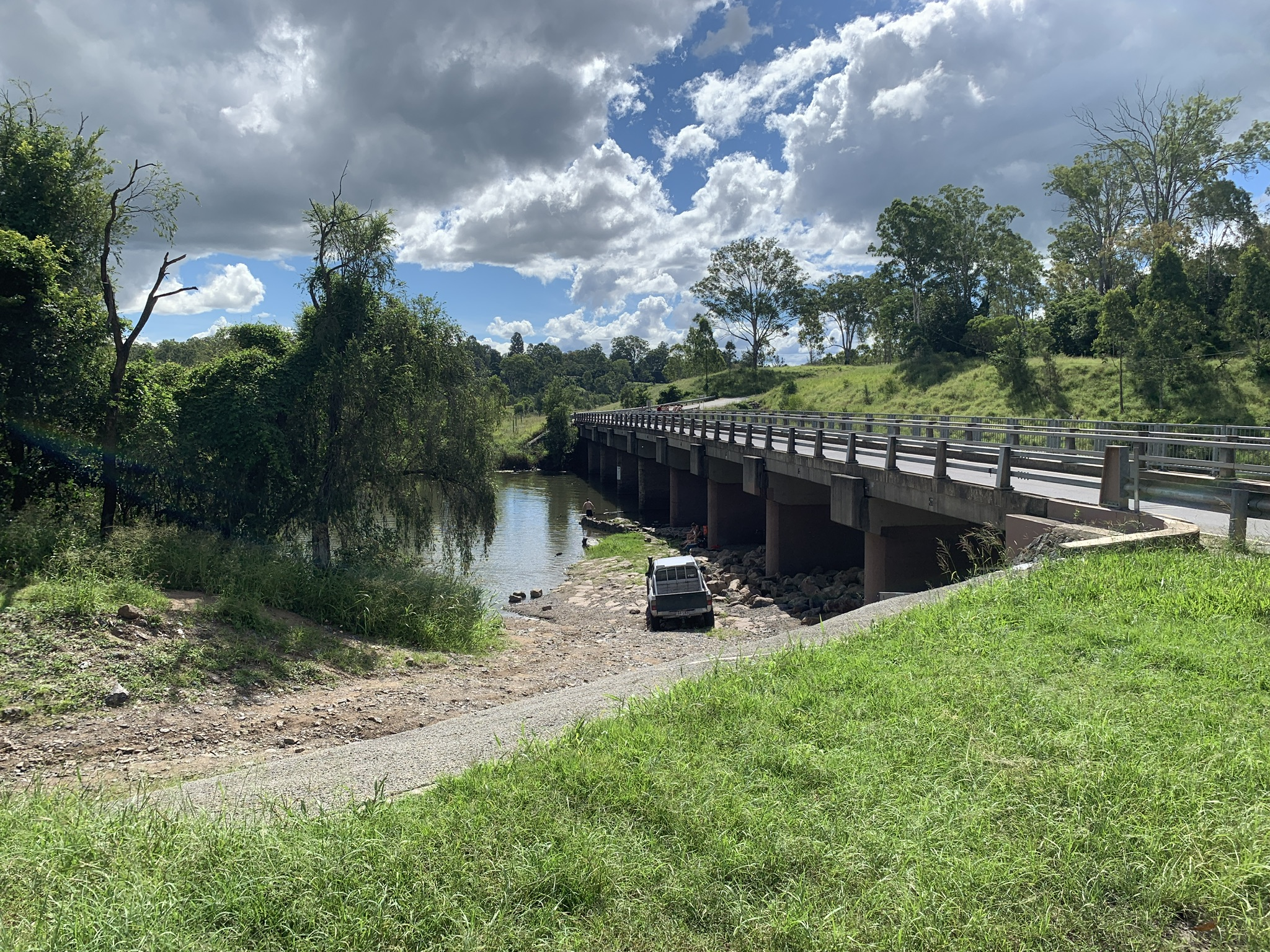
- Kholo Bridge, 2022

- Interactive map of Kholo
- Coordinates: 27.5222°S 152.7721°E
- Country: Australia
- State: Queensland
- City: Brisbane
- LGA: City of Brisbane (Pullenvale Ward)
- Location: 10.4 km (6.5 mi) N of Ipswich CBD; 42.3 km (26.3 mi) WSW of Brisbane CBD

Government
  - State electorate: Moggill
  - Federal division: Blair

Area
  - Total: 39.4 km^{2} (15.2 sq mi)

Population
  - Total: 374 (2021 census)
  - Density: 9.492/km^{2} (24.59/sq mi)
- Time zone: UTC+10:00 (AEST)
- Postcode: 4306
Suburbs around Kholo
Lake Manchester	Lake Manchester	Upper Brookfield
Pine Mountain	Kholo	Pullenvale; Anstead
Muirlea	Chuwar	Mount Crosby

Kholo is a rural locality in the City of Brisbane, Queensland, Australia. In the 2021 census, Kholo had a population of 374 people.

== Geography ==
Kholo is an outermost locality of the City of Brisbane, located 42.3 kilometres (26.3 mi) by road WSW from the Brisbane CBD, but only 10.4 kilometres (6.5 mi) by road west from the Ipswich CBD.

The locality is bounded to the south and west by the Brisbane River and to the north by the Dandy Range and to the north-east by the D'Aguilar Range.

Kholo has the following mountains (from north to south):

- Dandys Knob (27.4910°S 152.7891°E) 229 metres (751 ft)
- Changing Mountain (27.5055°S 152.7740°E) 146 metres (479 ft)
- Mount Seimon (27.5217°S 152.7703°E) 137 metres (449 ft)

Lake Manchester Road enters the locality from the south-west (Mount Crosby) and exits to the north-west (Lake Manchester). Kholo Road enters the locality from the south-east, crossing the Brisbane River on the Kholo Bridge (27.56501°S 152.74765°E), from Chuwar (in City of Brisbane) and Muirlea (in City of Ipswich). Kholo Road terminates at its junction with Lake Manchester Road in the north-west of the locality.

The land use is a mixture of grazing on native vegetation, rural residential housing, and bushland reserves.

== History ==
Land sales took place in the parish of Kholo in October 1852.

On Friday 23 June 1876, the Kholo Bridge across the Brisbane River to Chuwar was officially opened. Due to a period of heavy rain, the river was swollen and the deck of the new bridge was 3 feet (0.91 m) below the surface of the river. Determined to have a first official crossing of the bridge, a group of workmen pulled a buggy containing Mrs James Foote (described as a "courageous lady") across the submerged bridge and Mrs Foote smashed a bottle against a bridge post and named the bridge. A banquet followed the ceremony.

Kholo Provisional School opened circa 1 January 1877. It was described in June 1877 as being in a barn in an inconvenient location. In June 1878, the local residents were advocating for a more permanent state school. In September 1883, a report describes the school as having "most irregular" attendance. In July 1884, Kholo was again mentioned as having an average attendance of 16 students out of 30 enrolled. It closed circa 1 December 1884. In July 1886, local residents asked for a state school to replace the former provisional school, but no further schools were built in the area.

In May 1881, tenders were called for the erection of a provisional school in Lower Kholo (now Mount Crosby), which seems to result in Kholo Provisional School being casually referred to as Upper Kholo Provisional School.

Kholo, Mount Crosby and Karana Downs were transferred from the City of Ipswich to become part of City of Brisbane in 2000.

== Demographics ==
In the 2011 census, Kholo had a population of 397 people, 50.4% female and 49.6% male. The median age of the Kholo population was 42 years of age, 5 years above the Australian median. 84.8% of people living in Kholo were born in Australia, compared to the national average of 69.8%; the next most common countries of birth were England 5.1%, New Zealand 1.8%, Samoa 1.3%, Scotland 1%, Finland 0.8%. 96% of people spoke only English at home; the next most common languages were 1.5% Samoan, 1% Vietnamese.

In the 2016 census, Kholo had a population of 396 people.

In the 2021 census, Kholo had a population of 374 people.

== Education ==
There are no schools in Kholo. The nearest government primary schools are Mount Crosby State School in Karana Downs to the south-east and Brassall State School in Brassall, Ipswich, to the south. The nearest government secondary schools are Ipswich State High School in Brassall to the south and Kenmore State High School in Kenmore to the east.

== Amenities ==
There are a number of parks in the area (from north to south):

- Changing Mountain Bushland, 384 Lake Manchester Road with walking tracks through bushland (27.5143°S 152.7926°E)
- Skyline Drive Park, 80 Skyline Drive with a playground (27.5314°S 152.7481°E)
