= Ganjevan, Ilam =

Village in Ilam province, Iran

Ganjevan Persian: گنجوان
- Village
- Location within Iran Location within Ilam Province
- Coordinates: 33°44′49″N 45°58′14″E
- Country: Iran
- Province: Ilam
- County: Chavar
- District: Buli
- Rural District: Buli

Population (2016)
  - Total: 292
- Time zone: UTC+3:30 (IRST)

Ganjevan (Persian: گنجوان) (Note: Also romanized as Ganjevān; also known as Kanjavān) is a village in, and the former capital of, Buli Rural District of Buli District, Chavar County, Ilam province, Iran, serving as capital of the district. The capital of the rural district has been transferred to the village of Chaman-e Seyyed Mohammad.

== Demographics ==
=== Ethnicity ===
The village is mainly populated by Kurds.

=== Population ===
At the time of the 2006 National Census, the village's population was 349 in 82 households, when it was in Chavar District (Note: Renamed the Central District of Chavar County) of Ilam County. The following census in 2011 counted 378 people in 83 households. The 2016 census measured the population of the village as 292 people in 80 households. It was the most populous village in its rural district.

In 2019, the district was separated from the county in the establishment of Chavar County and renamed the Central District. The rural district was transferred to the new Buli District.
