= Pardeh =

Pardeh (Persian: پارده) may refer to:

- Pardeh, Ilam
- Pardeh, Khuzestan
