= Lake Manchester =

- Suburb
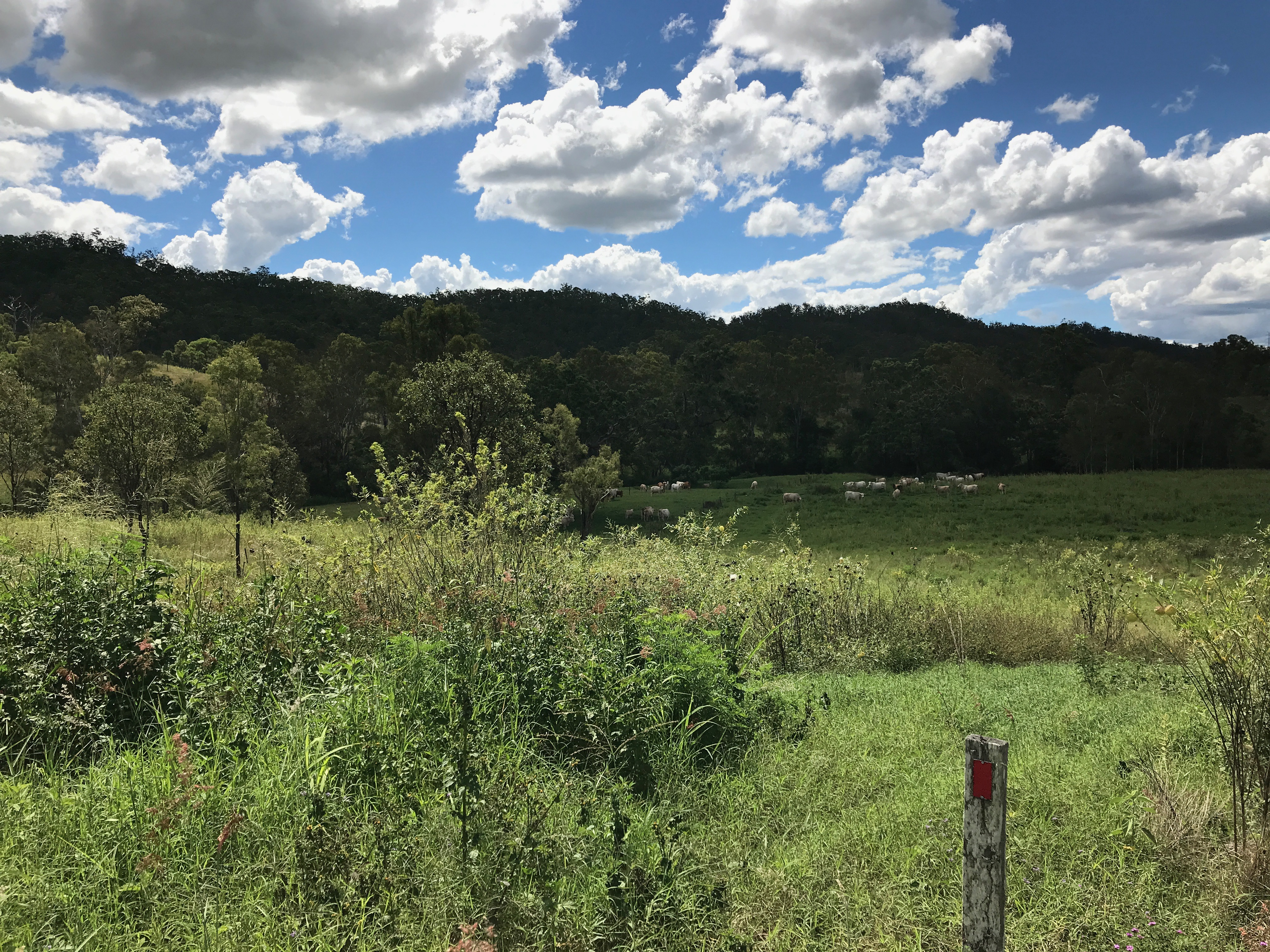
- Waverley Road, Lake Manchester, 2022

- Interactive map of Lake Manchester
- Coordinates: 27.4733°S 152.7177°E
- Country: Australia
- State: Queensland
- City: Brisbane
- LGAs: City of Brisbane (Pullenvale Ward), Somerset Region
- Location: 21.7 km (13.5 mi) N of Ipswich CBD; 43.8 km (27.2 mi) W of Brisbane CBD; 76.2 km (47.3 mi) SE of Esk

Government
  - State electorates: Moggill; Lockyer
  - Federal divisions: Ryan; Blair

Area
  - Total: 94.2 km^{2} (36.4 sq mi)

Population
  - Total: 17 (2021 census)
  - Density: 0.180/km^{2} (0.467/sq mi)
- Time zone: UTC+10:00 (AEST)
- Postcode: 4306
Suburbs around Lake Manchester
Banks Creek	Jollys Lookout; Highvale	Enoggera Reservoir
Banks Creek	Lake Manchester	Upper Brookfield
Kholo	Kholo	Kholo

Lake Manchester is both a lake in the City of Brisbane and the surrounding locality which is split between the City of Brisbane and Somerset Region in Queensland, Australia. It is 30 kilometres (19 mi) west of the CBD. In the 2021 census, Lake Manchester had a population of 17 people.

== Geography ==
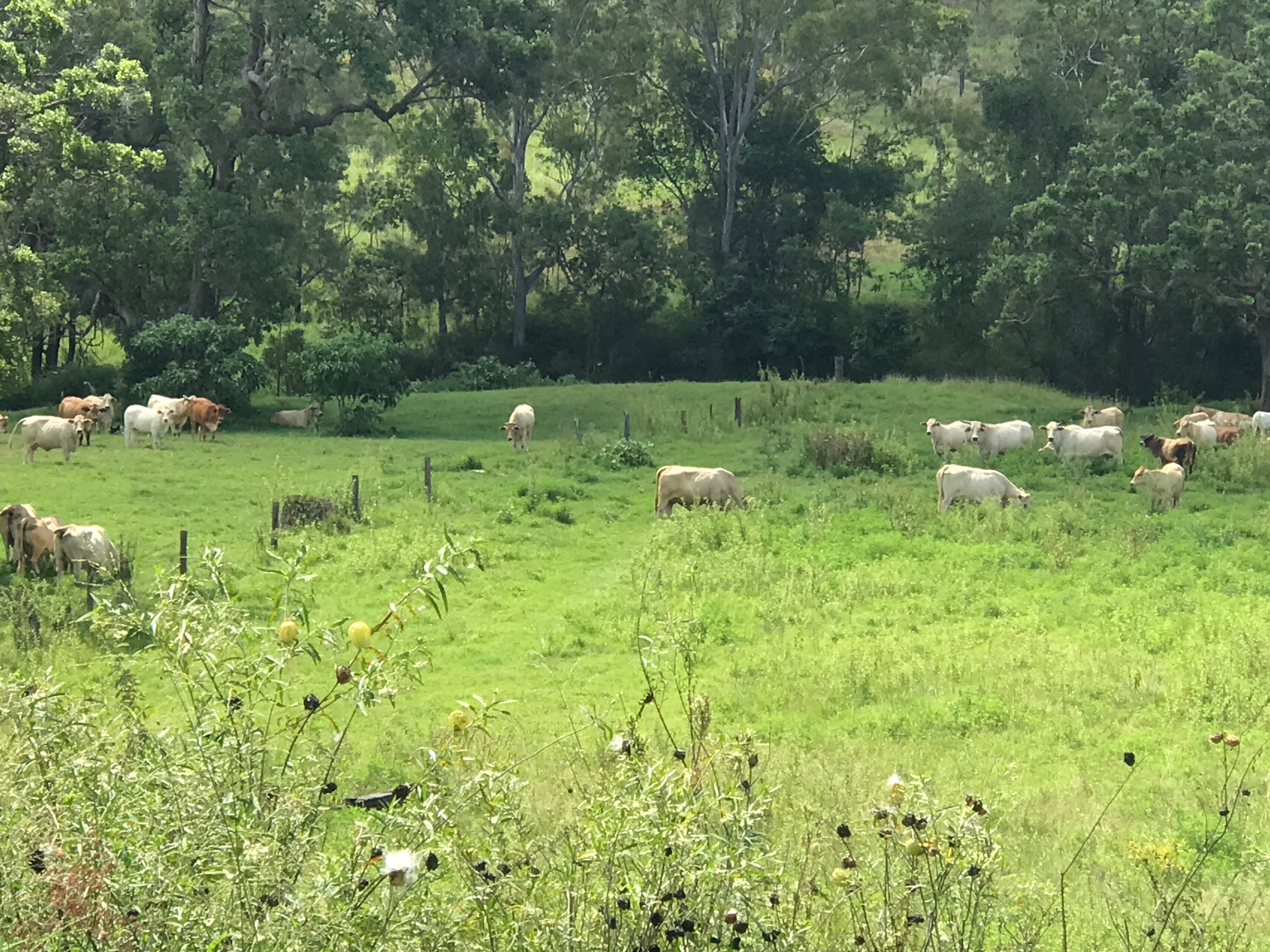
Cattle grazing in the west of the locality, 2022

The locality is mostly undeveloped mountainous terrain of the south west D'Aguilar Range. The north of the suburb is part of the D'Aguilar National Park and most of the southern parts belong to the Brisbane State Forest.

The western part of the locality in Somerset Region is rural land, predominantly used for grazing on native vegetation.

== History ==
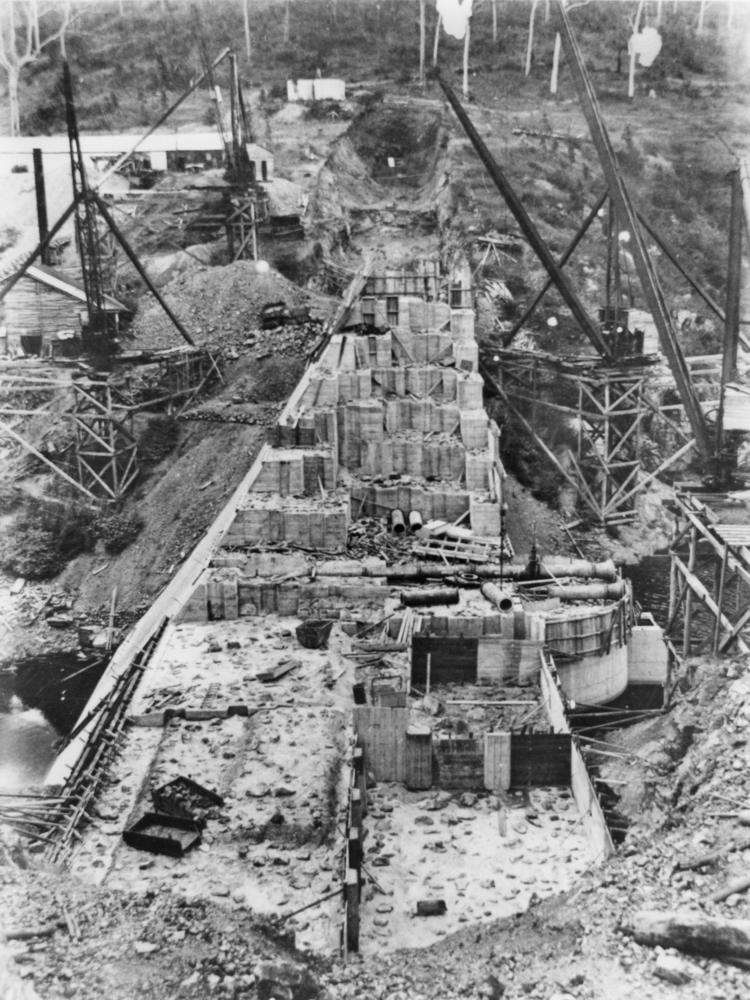
Dam wall under construction, 1916

Noogoora Provisional School opened in 1900. It must have subsequently closed as residents were requesting it be reopened in 1911. It became a State School on 1 December 1914. It was renamed Cabbage Tree State School circa 1916-1917. It closed circa 1919. It was on the southern side of Lake Manchester Road (approx 27.48309°S 152.73824°E). The name Noogoora is associated with a large farm of 1,425 acres (577 ha) with a 3-mile (4.8 km) frontage to the Brisbane River in the area. Cabbage Tree Creek is flows near the school and is a tributary of the Brisbane River (27.500557°S 152.735738°E).

The locality is named after the lake which was created by the Lake Manchester Dam constructed between 1912 and 1916. It is named after civil engineer, Ernest James Theodore Manchester, who was the President of the Metropolitan Water and Sewerage Board from 1909 to 1928. It impounds Cabbage Tree Creek.

== Demographics ==
In the 2016 census, Lake Manchester had a population of 23 people.

In the 2021 census, Lake Manchester had a population of 17 people.

== Education ==
There are no schools in Lake Manchester. The nearest government primary school is Mount Crosby State School in Karara Downs to the south. The nearest government secondary school is Ipswich State High School in Brassall, Ipswich, to the south.
