= Chega, Iran =

Village in Ilam province, Iran

Chega Persian: چگا
- Village
- Location within Iran Location within Ilam Province
- Coordinates: 33°43′51″N 46°11′43″E
- Country: Iran
- Province: Ilam
- County: Chavar
- District: Central
- Rural District: Hajji Bakhtiar

Population (2016)
  - Total: 130
- Time zone: UTC+3:30 (IRST)

Chega (Persian: چگا) (Note: Also romanized as Chegā‘; also known as Chegāh) is a village in, and the capital of, Hajji Bakhtiar Rural District of the Central District (Note: Formerly Chavar District of Ilam County) of Chavar County, Ilam province, Iran.

== Demographics ==
=== Ethnicity ===
The village is populated by Kurds.

=== Population ===
At the time of the 2006 National Census, the village's population was 144 in 31 households, when it was in Arkavazi Rural District of Chavar District (Note: Renamed the Central District of Chavar County) in Ilam County. The following census in 2011 counted 141 people in 36 households. The 2016 census measured the population of the village as 130 people in 36 households.

In 2019, the district was separated from the county in the establishment of Chavar County and renamed the Central District. Chega was transferred to Hajji Bakhtiar Rural District created in the district.
