= Chuwar, Queensland =

Chuwar
- Town
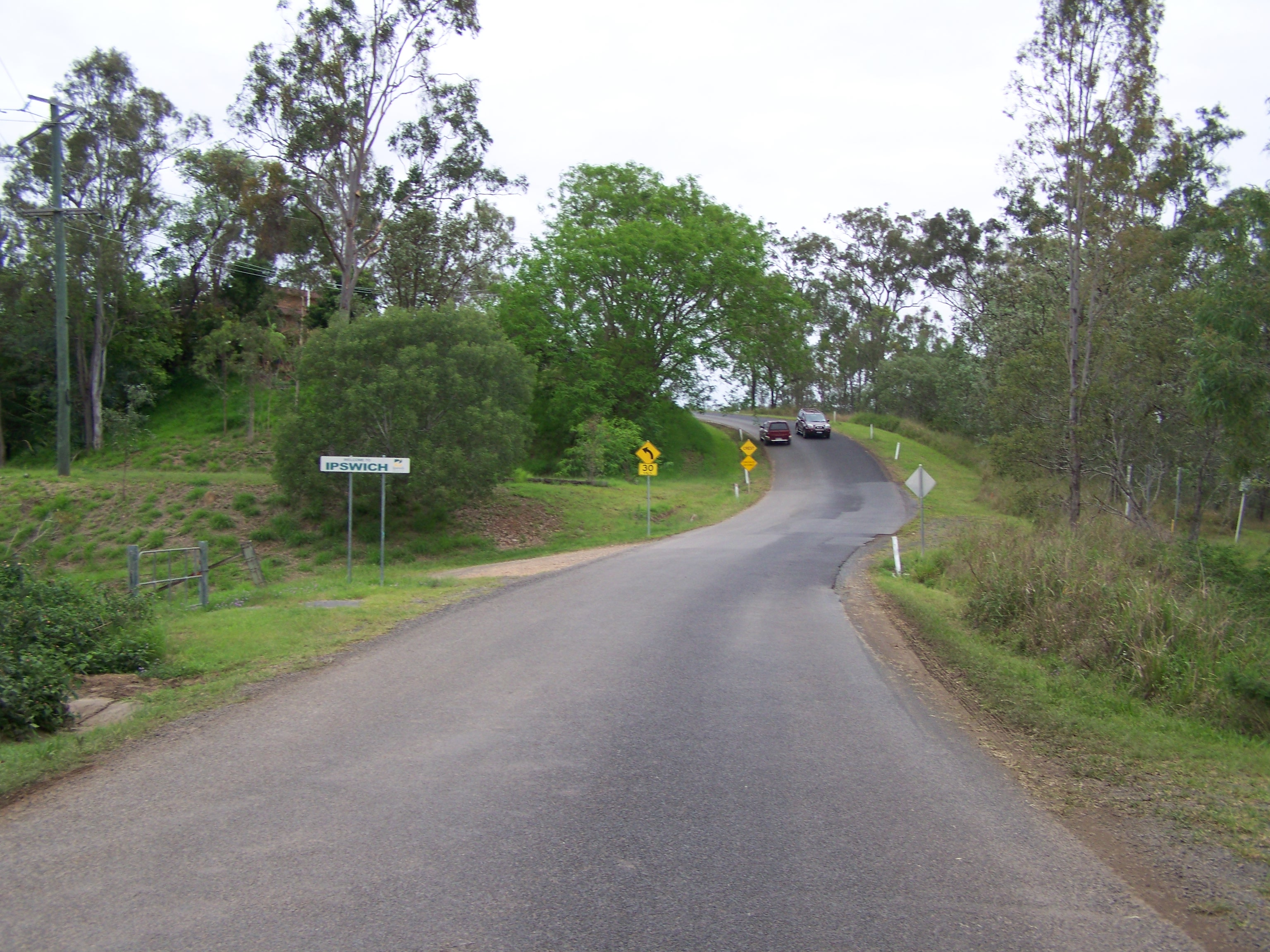
- Welcome to Ipswich sign, 2010

- Interactive map of Chuwar
- Coordinates: 27.5683°S 152.7969°E
- Country: Australia
- State: Queensland
- City: Ipswich
- LGAs: City of Ipswich; City of Brisbane (Pullenvale Ward)
- Location: 7.5 km (4.7 mi) NE of Ipswich CBD; 32.8 km (20.4 mi) WSW of Brisbane CBD

Government
  - State electorate: Ipswich West
  - Federal division: Blair

Area
  - Total: 8.9 km^{2} (3.4 sq mi)

Population
  - Total: 2,178 (2021 census)
  - Density: 244.7/km^{2} (634/sq mi)
- Time zone: UTC+10:00 (AEST)
- Postcode: 4306
Localities around Chuwar
Kholo	Mount Crosby	Karana Downs
Muirlea	Chuwar	Karalee
North Ipswich	Tivoli	North Tivoli

Chuwar is a town and suburb of Ipswich in the City of Ipswich and a locality of the City of Brisbane in South East Queensland, Australia. In the 2021 census, the suburb of Chuwar had a population of 2,178 people.

== Geography ==
Chuwar is 6 kilometres (4 mi) north of the Ipswich central business district, 32 kilometres (20 mi) west of Brisbane by road. The suburb is known for its leafy streets and solid brick homes which line Allawah Road, Lansdowne Way and Brodzig Road.

Mount Crosby Road runs north through the southeastern corner.

== History ==
The town takes its name from the parish, which in turn was named in October 1848 by surveyor James Warner. The origin of the name was not recorded by Warner but it has been suggested that it was the Ugarapul name for the district or a corruption of it.

On Friday 23 June 1876, the Kholo Bridge across the Brisbane River to Kholo (27.5650°S 152.7476°E) was officially opened. Due to a period of heavy rain, the river was swollen and the deck of the new bridge was 3 feet (0.91 m) below the surface of the river. Determined to have a first official crossing of the bridge, a group of men pulled a buggy containing a "courageous lady" across the submerged bridge and Mrs Foote smashed a bottle against a bridge post and named the bridge. A banquet followed the ceremony.

== Demographics ==
In the 2011 census, the suburb of Chuwar had a population of 1,875 people, 49.7% female and 50.3% male. The median age of the Chuwar population was 34 years, 3 years below the Australian median of 37. 82.6% of people living in Chuwar were born in Australia. Other main countries of birth were England 4.9%, New Zealand 2.7%, South Africa 1.7%, Scotland 0.8%, and United States of America 0.4%. 95.3% of people spoke only English at home; the next most popular languages were, 0.5% Afrikaans, 0.3% Tagalog, 0.3% German, 0.3% Dutch, and 0.2% Portuguese.

In the 2016 census, the suburb of Chuwar had a population of 2,244 people.

In the 2021 census, the suburb of Chuwar had a population of 2,178 people.

== Heritage listings ==
Chuwar has a number of heritage-listed sites, including:

- Mount Crosby Pumping Station, Allawah Road (27.5374°S 152.7962°E)

== Education ==
There are no schools in Chuwar. The nearest government primary schools are Mount Crosby State School in neighbouring Karana Downs to the north-east, Tivoli State School in neighbouring Tivoli to the south, and Brassall State School in Brassall to the south-west. The nearest government secondary school is Ipswich State High School in Brassall.

== Amenities ==
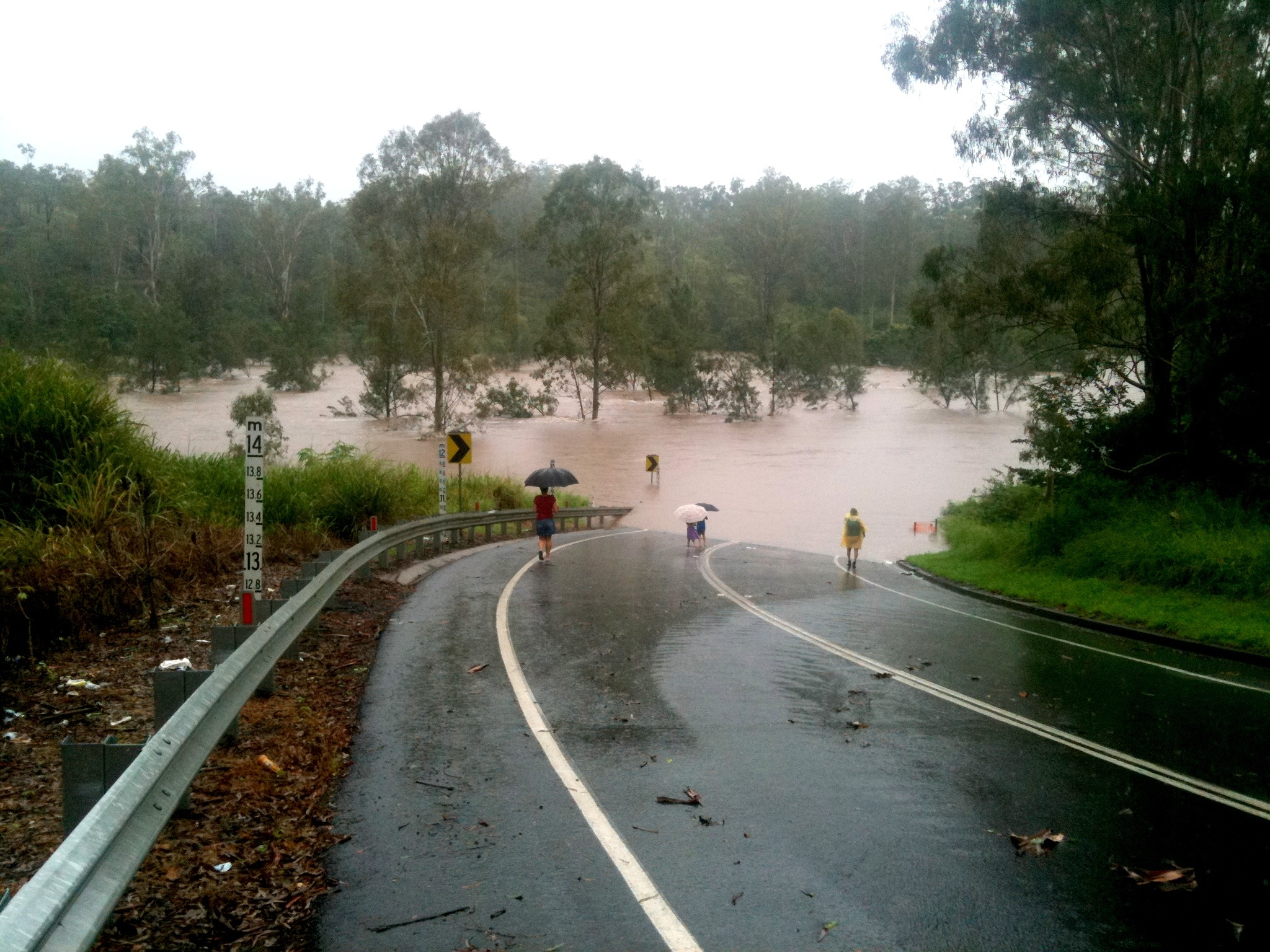
Colleges Crossing underwater at Chuwar during the 2011 floods

Chuwar has a number of amenities including a service station, a produce store, two churches, a motorcycle track and a veterinary surgery. There is a shopping centre with a major supermarket in the neighbouring suburb of Karalee. The suburb's two churches are Chuwar Baptist Church, which runs a yearly community day called the Street Party, and Rivers of Life Christian Church, which operates the Tivoli Drive In Theatre & Community Events Centre and market stalls. Chuwar includes the residential Karana Gardens Estate.

Chuwar includes Colleges Crossing, a popular park and river crossing on the Brisbane River with walking trails, lookouts, and clean water for swimming and fishing.

== Transport ==
Chuwar is accessible by road with Mount Crosby Road directing traffic directly to Ipswich and Karana Downs, and the Warrego Highway routing traffic to Brisbane and Toowoomba.

== Proposed Kenmore Bypass ==
The Kenmore Bypass, also known as the "Western Freeway Extension" and the "Moggill Pocket Sub-Arterial", is a proposed motorway to run from the Western Freeway at Fig Tree Pocket to the Warrego Highway at Chuwar, connecting the suburbs of Karalee, Anstead, Pullenvale and Kenmore, to divert traffic from the Ipswich Motorway and Moggill Road. As at October 2009, no decision had been made about the proposal and no funding has been allocated to pursue it further.

== Notable residents ==
- Maimuna Memon, actress.
