= Karana Downs, Queensland =

Karana Downs
- Suburb
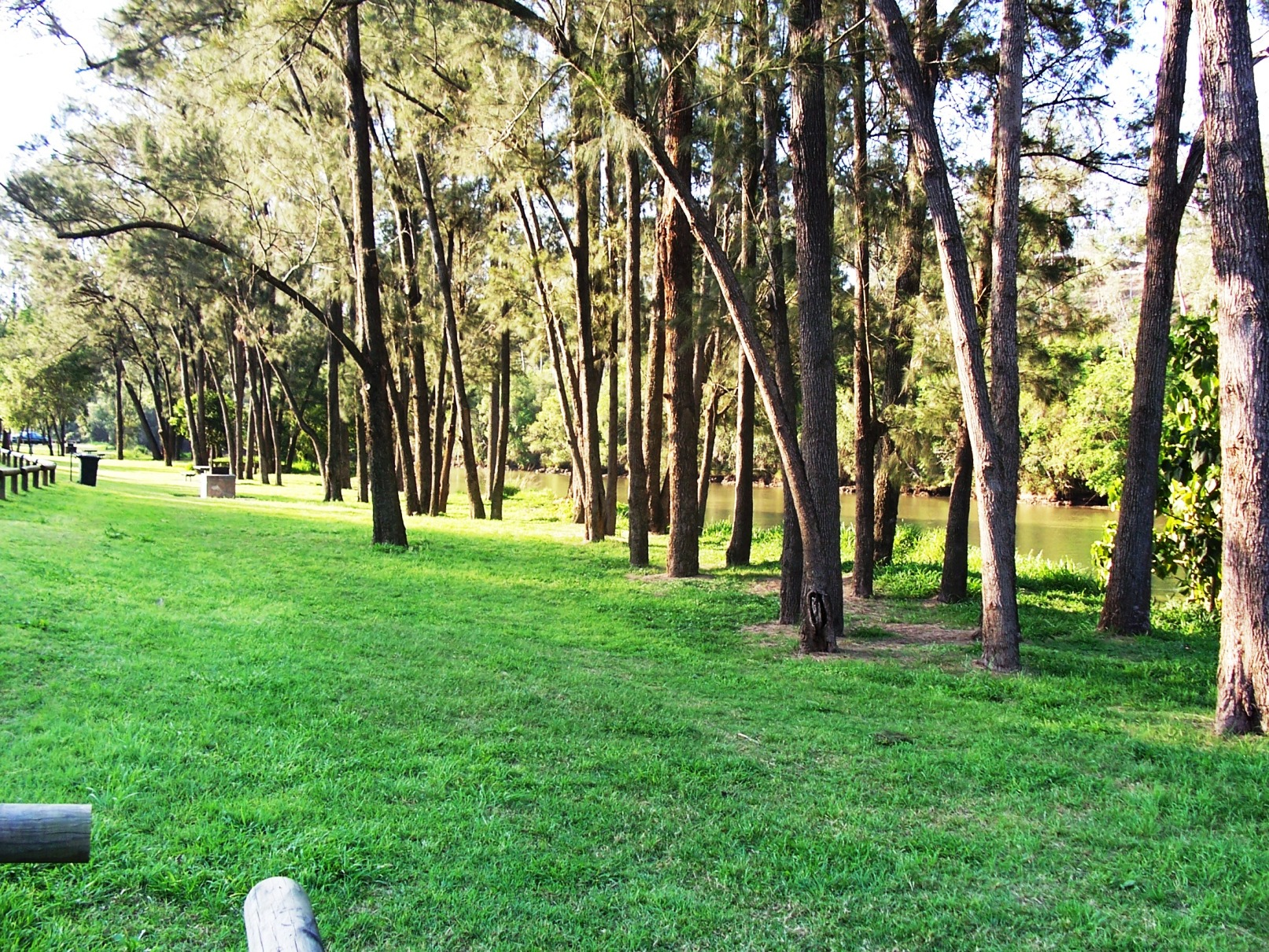
- Kookaburra Park, near the Brisbane River

- Interactive map of Karana Downs
- Coordinates: 27.5425°S 152.8224°E
- Country: Australia
- State: Queensland
- City: Brisbane
- LGA: City of Brisbane (Pullenvale Ward)
- Location: 12.2 km (7.6 mi) NE of Ipswich CBD; 30.4 km (18.9 mi) SW of Brisbane CBD

Government
  - State electorate: Moggill
  - Federal division: Blair

Area
  - Total: 7.5 km^{2} (2.9 sq mi)

Population
  - Total: 3,800 (2021 census)
  - Density: 507/km^{2} (1,312/sq mi)
- Time zone: UTC+10:00 (AEST)
- Postcode: 4306
Suburbs around Karana Downs
Mount Crosby	Mount Crosby	Mount Crosby
Mount Crosby	Karana Downs	Karalee
Chuwar	Karalee	Karalee

Karana Downs is a residential Suburb of the city of Brisbane, Queensland, Australia. In the 2021 census, Karana Downs had a population of 3,800 people.

== Geography ==
The locality is bordered by the Brisbane River to the south and east, and by Mount Crosby Road to the north and north-west.

Many of the streets and parks in Karana Downs have Aboriginal names.

== History ==
Mount Crosby Provisional School opened on 30 January 1882 with 22 pupils under teacher Arthur Leigh. It closed on 31 December 1892, but soon reopened on 11 September 1893 as Mount Crosby State School under head teacher Samuel Rea.

On 13 May 1948, Queensland Premier Ned Hanlon officially opened the first section of the Mount Crosby East Bank Water Treatment Plant.

The modern locality of Karana Downs was developed from parts of the areas of Kholo, Lake Manchester, and Mount Crosby with 5 square kilometres (1.9 sq mi) of land being divided in 1973. The name Karana Downs was proposed by the developer; it has been suggested that Karana is an Aboriginal name meaning quiet place. Karana Downs was originally part of the Shire of Moreton and then later of the City of Ipswich.

In the 1990s, residents lobbied to become part of the City of Brisbane. In 2000 Kholo, Mount Crosby and Karana Downs were transferred from the City of Ipswich to become part of the City of Brisbane.

== Demographics ==
In the 2001 census, there were 5,177 people residing in Karana Downs. Between the 1996 census and 2001 census, there was a 0.3% population increase.

In the 2006 census, Karana Downs had a population of 3,840 people.

In the 2011 census, Karana Downs recorded a population of was 3,826 people, 50.4% female and 49.6% male. The median age of the Karana Downs population was 36 years of age, 1 year below the Australian median. 76.2% of people living in Karana Downs were born in Australia, compared to the national average of 69.8%; the next most common countries of birth were England 7.5%, New Zealand 3.8%, South Africa 2.1%, Germany 0.7%, United States of America 0.7%. 93.4% of people spoke English as their first language 0.6% Afrikaans, 0.5% German, 0.4% French, 0.4% Spanish, 0.3% Dutch.

In the 2016 census, Karana Downs had a population of 3,862 people.

In the 2021 census, Karana Downs had a population of 3,800 people.

== Education ==
Mount Crosby State School is a government primary (Prep-6) school for boys and girls at 541 Mount Crosby Road (27.5508°S 152.8070°E). In 2018, the school had an enrolment of 661 students with 50 teachers (42 full-time equivalent) and 27 non-teaching staff (16 full-time equivalent). It includes a special education program.

There is no secondary school in Karana Downs. The nearest government secondary school is Ipswich State High School in Brassall in Ipswich to the south-west.

== Facilities ==
Karana Downs Fire Station is at 2 College Road (27.5524°S 152.8069°E).

Karana Downs Police Station is at 6 College Road adjacent to the fire station (27.5525°S 152.8073°E).

Mount Crosby Eastbank Water Treatment Plant is at 850 Mount Crosby Road (27.5292°S 152.8033°E) extending into neighbouring Mount Crosby.

Karana Downs Sewage Treatment Plant is at 69A Nalya Crescent (27.5406°S 152.8344°E).

== Amenities ==
Karana Downs Shopping Centre is on the corner of Awonga Court, College Road and Tanderra Way (27.5469°S 152.8231°E).

There is a boat ramp at Caringal Drive into the Brisbane River at Kookaburra Park (27.5427°S 152.8411°E).

The Karana Downs Country Club has an 18-hole golf course, which formed part of the original plans for the Karana Downs development. In 2011, there were plans to redevelop the golf course into a medium density residential area; these plans were rejected by Brisbane City Council on 27 October 2011. An appeal to the Planning and Environmental Court by the developer was lodged but withdrawn in August 2012.

=== Parks ===
There are a number of parks in the area:

- Atkinson Drive Reserve (27.5566°S 152.8067°E)
- Burrun Park (27.5491°S 152.8209°E)
- College Road Park (27.5516°S 152.8114°E)
- Dumburbu Park (27.5469°S 152.8142°E)
- Emungerie Grove Reserve (27.5336°S 152.8125°E)
- Heritage Park (27.5438°S 152.8321°E)
- Illawong Reserve (27.5528°S 152.8189°E)
- Kookaburra Park (27.5429°S 152.8392°E)
- Kupi Park (27.5405°S 152.8234°E)
- Lions Nature Trail Park (27.5366°S 152.8196°E)
- Murri Park (27.5544°S 152.8135°E)

Kookaburra Park is a large park on the bank of the Brisbane River. Prior to the 2010–11 Queensland floods, it included a boat ramp, children's play area, amphitheatre, fishing platform, and off-leash dog area. Virtually the entire park was destroyed by flood-waters in 2011; it has since been reopened with reduced facilities.

== Public transport ==
Due to insufficient population density, according to the Transport Minister and Department, the suburb generally lacks public transport however, in late 2006, a taxi van with a capacity of 10 people, started ferrying people every 20 minutes from 6:30 am to 9:00 am from Karana Downs, and nearby Mount Crosby and Anstead, to Bellbowrie, where commuters can link up with TransLink bus route 444.
