= Murt, Ilam =

Village in Ilam province, Iran

Murt Persian: مورت
- Village
- Location within Iran Location within Ilam Province
- Coordinates: 33°42′10″N 46°16′16″E
- Country: Iran
- Province: Ilam
- County: Chavar
- District: Central
- Rural District: Arkavazi

Population (2016)
  - Total: 1,088
- Time zone: UTC+3:30 (IRST)

Murt (Persian: مورت) (Note: Also romanized as Mūrt; also known as Kāni Mūrt) is a village in, and the capital of, Arkavazi Rural District of the Central District (Note: Formerly Chavar District of Ilam County) of Chavar County, Ilam province, Iran.

== Demographics ==
=== Ethnicity ===
The village is populated by Kurds.

=== Population ===
At the time of the 2006 National Census, the village's population was 1,082 in 204 households, when it was in Chavar District (Note: Renamed the Central District of Chavar County) of Ilam County. The following census in 2011 counted 1,200 people in 271 households. The 2016 census measured the population of the village as 1,088 people in 284 households. It was the most populous village in its rural district.

In 2019, the district was separated from the county in the establishment of Chavar County and renamed the Central District.
