= Chuwar =

Chuwar may refer to:

- Chuwar, Queensland, Australia
- Chavar, Iran
