= Pardeh, Ilam =

Pardeh پارده
- Village
- Location within Iran
- Coordinates: 33°47′03″N 46°05′39″E
- Country: Iran
- Province: Ilam
- County: Ilam
- Bakhsh: Chavar
- Rural District: Arkavazi

Population (2006)
  - Total: 149
- Time zone: UTC+3:30 (IRST)
  - Summer (DST): UTC+4:30 (IRDT)

Pardeh (Persian: پارده, also Romanized as Pārdeh) is a village in Arkavazi Rural District, Chavar District, Ilam County, Ilam Province, Iran. At the 2006 census, its population was 149, in 31 families. The village is populated by Kurds.
