= Karalee, Queensland =

Karalee Ipswich, Queensland
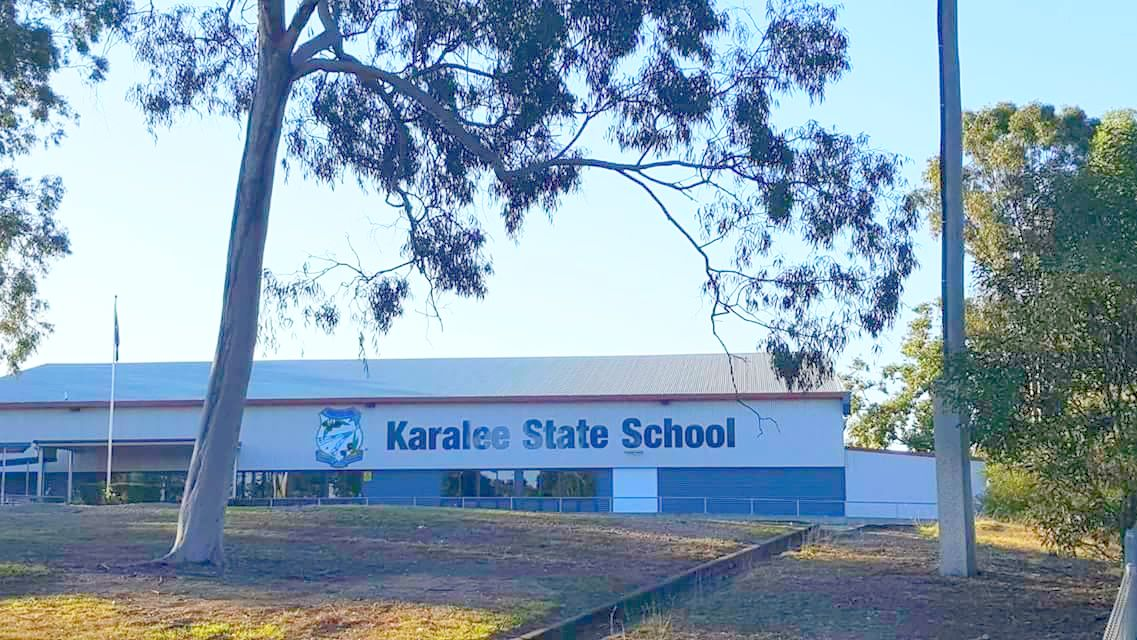
- Karalee State School, 2022

- Coordinates: 27.5586°S 152.8208°E
- Population: 5,521 (2021 census)
  - Density: 353.9/km^{2} (916.6/sq mi)
- Postcode(s): 4306
- Area: 15.6 km^{2} (6.0 sq mi)
- Time zone: AEST (UTC+10:00)
- Location: 8.9 km (6 mi) NE of Ipswich CBD; 38.0 km (24 mi) SW of Brisbane CBD
- LGA(s): City of Ipswich
- State electorate(s): Ipswich West
- Federal division(s): Blair
Suburbs around Karalee:
Mount Crosby	Karana Downs	Anstead
Chuwar	Karalee	Barellan Point
North Tivoli	Bundamba	Riverview

Karalee is a rural residential suburb of Ipswich in the City of Ipswich, Queensland, Australia. In the 2021 census, Karalee had a population of 5,521 people.

== Geography ==
The suburb of Karalee is bordered by Brisbane River to the north and north-east and by the Bremer River to the south.

== History ==
Karalee was first named by the Queensland Place Names Board on 1 September 1973. The name Karalee is an Ugarapul word meaning 'pretty hill beside the water'.

Karalee State School opened on 25 January 1985.

== Demographics ==
In the 2016 census, Karalee had a population of 4,352 people.

In the 2021 census, Karalee had a population of 5,521 people.

== Education ==
Karalee State School is a government primary (Prep-6) school for boys and girls at 77 Arthur Summervilles Road (27.5626°S 152.8254°E). In 2017, the school had an enrolment of 566 students with 35 teachers (32 full-time equivalent) and 22 non-teaching staff (13 full-time equivalent). The school includes a special education program. Karalee State School has three houses: Nowra, Kalara and Summerville.

There are no secondary schools in Karalee. The nearest government secondary school is Ipswich State High School in Brassall to the south-east.

There are numerous non-government schools in Ipswich and its suburbs.

== Amenities ==
Karalee has one shopping village with a Woolworths, a Coles, a newsagent and other stores. Karalee has a scouts base, a rugby league team, a swimming club and a tennis club.

The Ipswich City Council operates a fortnightly mobile library service which visits the shopping centre.
