= Chega (disambiguation) =

Chega is a political party in Portugal.

Chega may also refer to:

- Chega, Iran, a village
- Chega!, a report by the Commission for Reception, Truth and Reconciliation in East Timor
- "Chega" (song), a 2020 song by Gaia Gozzi
