= Qebleh, Ilam =

Qebleh قبله
- Village
- Location within Iran
- Coordinates: 33°36′49″N 46°05′43″E
- Country: Iran
- Province: Ilam
- County: Ilam
- Bakhsh: Chavar
- Rural District: Boli

Population (2006)
  - Total: 136
- Time zone: UTC+3:30 (IRST)
  - Summer (DST): UTC+4:30 (IRDT)

Qebleh (Persian: قبله) is a village in Boli Rural District, Chavar District, Ilam County, Ilam Province, Iran. At the 2006 census, its population was 136, in 26 families. The village is populated by Kurds.
