= Extension bell =

Bell connected to a remote telephone

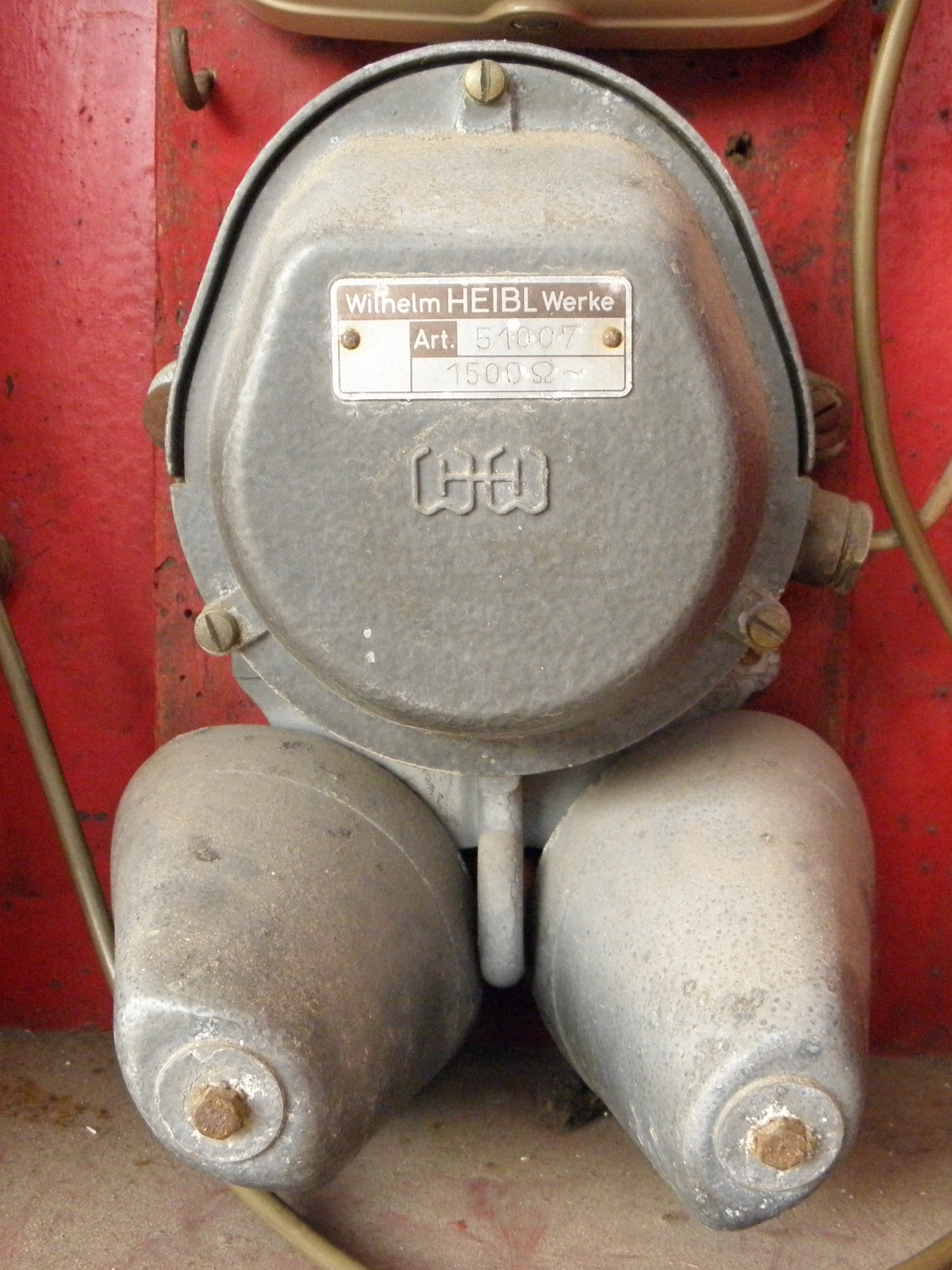
Extension telephone bell used by taxi service in Rovigo.

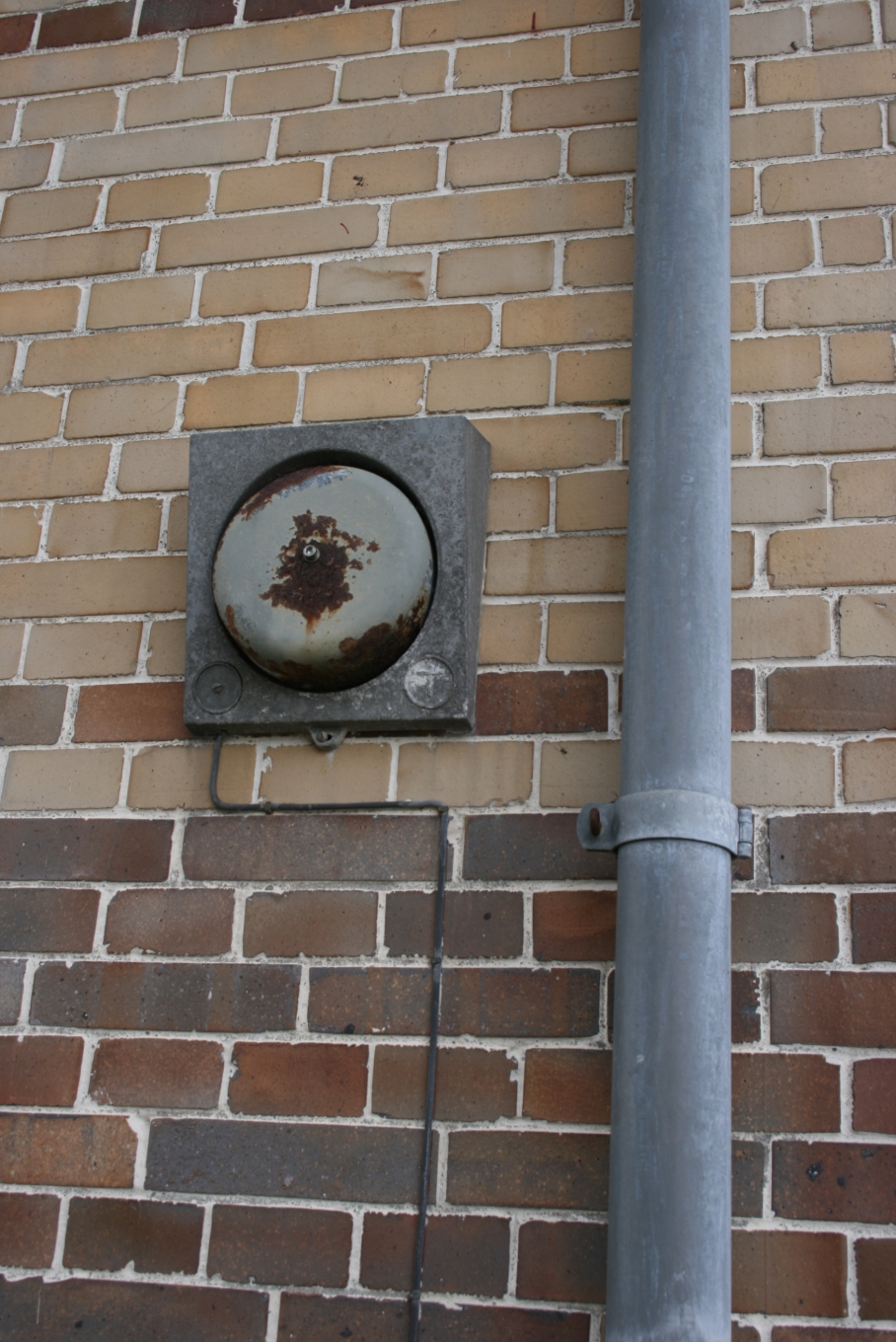
Extension bell located on the exterior of a lighthouse in Sprogø.

An extension bell or extension ringer is a device that generates a sound to indicate an incoming telephone call, but is not included in a telephone set itself.

Extension bells may be louder than ordinary telephone ringers. As such they may be used by persons with moderate hearing impairment to help them detect incoming telephone calls, especially when they are outside the telephone's room.

The devices were in use by the late 19th century. An early Australian system at Mount Crosby, Queensland featured an extension bell which was connected to an engineer's telephone over a distance of a quarter mile.
