= Avehza =

Avehza اوه زا
- Village
- Location within Iran
- Coordinates: 33°43′48″N 46°16′24″E
- Country: Iran
- Province: Ilam
- County: Ilam
- Bakhsh: Chavar
- Rural District: Arkavazi

Population (2006)
  - Total: 322
- Time zone: UTC+3:30 (IRST)
  - Summer (DST): UTC+4:30 (IRDT)
- Climate: Csa

Avehza (Persian: اوه زا, also Romanized as Āvehzā; also known as Ābzā) is a village in Arkavazi Rural District, Chavar District, Ilam County, Ilam Province, Iran. At the 2006 census, its population was 322, in 60 families. The village is populated by Kurds.
