= Pullenvale Ward =

Subdivision in Brisbane, Queensland, Australia

- Pullenvale Ward, 2024
- Created: 1985
- Councillor: Greg Adermann
- Party: Liberal National
- Namesake: Pullenvale
- Electors: 32,972 (2024)

The Pullenvale Ward is a Brisbane City Council ward covering Pullenvale, Anstead, Bellbowrie, Brookfield, Karana Downs, Kenmore, Kenmore Hills, Kholo, Lake Manchester, Moggill, Mount Crosby, Pinjarra Hills, Upper Brookfield and parts of Chapel Hill and Chuwar.

== Councillors for Pullenvale Ward ==
Image	Councillor	Party	Term	Notes
	Bob Mills	Liberal	30 March 1985 – 15 March 1997	
	Margaret de Wit	Liberal	15 March 1997 – 26 July 2008	
	Margaret de Wit	Liberal National	26 July 2008 – 19 March 2016	
	Kate Richards	Liberal National	19 March 2016 – 1 March 2020	Contested 2020 election as an independent. Lost seat.
	Kate Richards	Independent	1 March 2020 – 28 March 2020	Contested 2020 election as an independent. Lost seat.
	Greg Adermann	Liberal National	28 March 2020 – present	

== Results ==
=== 2024 ===
2024 Queensland local elections: Pullenvale Ward
Party	Candidate	Votes	%	±%
Liberal National	Greg Adermann	15,590	53.82	+12.14
Greens	Charles Druckmann	7,001	24.17	−0.21
Labor	Roberta Albrecht	3,312	11.43	−2.78
Independent	Kate Richards	3,062	10.57	−9.16
Total formal votes		28,965	98.2	+0.6
Informal votes		539	1.8	−0.6
Turnout		29,504	89.5	+6.8
Two-candidate-preferred result
Liberal National	Greg Adermann	16,902	64.32	+4.39
Greens	Charles Druckmann	9,374	35.68	−4.39
Liberal National hold		Swing	+4.39	

=== 2020 ===
2020 Queensland local elections: Pullenvale Ward
Party	Candidate	Votes	%	±%
Liberal National	Greg Adermann	10,686	41.68	−18.82
Greens	Charles Druckmann	6,252	24.38	+2.88
Independent	Kate Richards	5,060	19.73	+19.73
Labor	Jordan Mark	3,643	14.21	–3.79
Total formal votes		25,641	97.6	−0.2
Informal votes		618	2.4	+0.2
Turnout		26,259	82.7	−
Notional two-party-preferred count
Liberal National	Greg Adermann	12,388	62.2	–6.7
Labor	Jordan Mark	7,533	37.8	+6.7
Two-party-preferred result
Liberal National	Greg Adermann	12,086	59.93	−8.17
Greens	Charles Druckmann	8,080	40.07	+8.17
Liberal National hold		Swing	−8.17	

- Incumbent councillor Kate Richards left the LNP to contest as an independent

=== 2016 ===
2016 Queensland local elections: Pullenvale Ward
Party	Candidate	Votes	%	±%
Liberal National	Kate Richards	15,366	60.5	−14.1
Greens	John Belchamber	5,419	21.3	+7.9
Labor	Catherine Abel	4,628	18.2	+6.2
Total formal votes		25,413	-	−
Informal votes		575	-	−
Turnout		25,988	-	−
Notional two-party-preferred count
Liberal National	Kate Richards		68.9	
Labor	Catherine Abel		31.1	
Two-party-preferred result
Liberal National	Kate Richards	15,794	68.1	−14.6
Greens	John Belchamber	7,391	31.9	+14.6
Liberal National hold		Swing	−14.6	

=== 2004 ===
2004 Brisbane City Council election: Pullenvale Ward
Party	Candidate	Votes	%	±%
Liberal	Margaret de Wit	14,841	72.99	
Labor	Maree Bliss	3,434	16.89	
Greens	Richard Neehouse	2,058	10.12	
Total formal votes		20,333	98.78	
Informal votes		252	1.22	
Turnout		20,585	88.58	
Two-party-preferred result
Liberal	Margaret de Wit	15,239	78.99	
Labor	Maree Bliss	4,053	21.01	
Liberal hold		Swing		
