= Qabeleh =

Qabeleh or Qebleh (Persian: قبله) may refer to:

- Qebleh, Ilam
- Qebleh, Lorestan

== See also ==
- Qebleh Ei (disambiguation)
- Qeblehi (disambiguation)
- Qibleh (disambiguation)
