= Chuar =

Chuar may refer to:

- An ethnic group in West Bengal, Jharkhand, Odisha, India; part of the Bhumij people
  - A participant in the Chuar rebellion of Bengal Presidency
- Chavar, a city in Iran
- Chuar Group, a geologic group of the United States
