= Chakor Rural District =

Rural district in Ilam province, Iran

Chakor Rural District Persian: دهستان چکر
- Rural District
- Location within Iran Location within Ilam Province
- Coordinates: 33°36′59″N 45°59′15″E
- Country: Iran
- Province: Ilam
- County: Chavar
- District: Buli
- Capital: Pa Qaleh
- Time zone: UTC+3:30 (IRST)

Chakor Rural District (Persian: دهستان چکر) is in Buli District of Chavar County, Ilam province, Iran. Its capital is the village of Pa Qaleh, whose population at the time of the 2016 National Census was 105 people in 30 households.

== History ==
In 2019, Chavar District (Note: Renamed the Central District of Chavar County) was separated from Ilam County in the establishment of Chavar County and renamed the Central District. Chakor Rural District was created in the new Buli District.
