= Chawar =

Chawar may refer to:

- Chavar, city in Iran
- Ghawar Field, oil field in Saudi Arabia
