= Abza =

Abza (Persian: ابزا) may refer to:

- Abza-ye Sardasht, Chaharmahal and Bakhtiari province
- Abza, Ilam
