= Anstead, Queensland =

Anstead
- Suburb
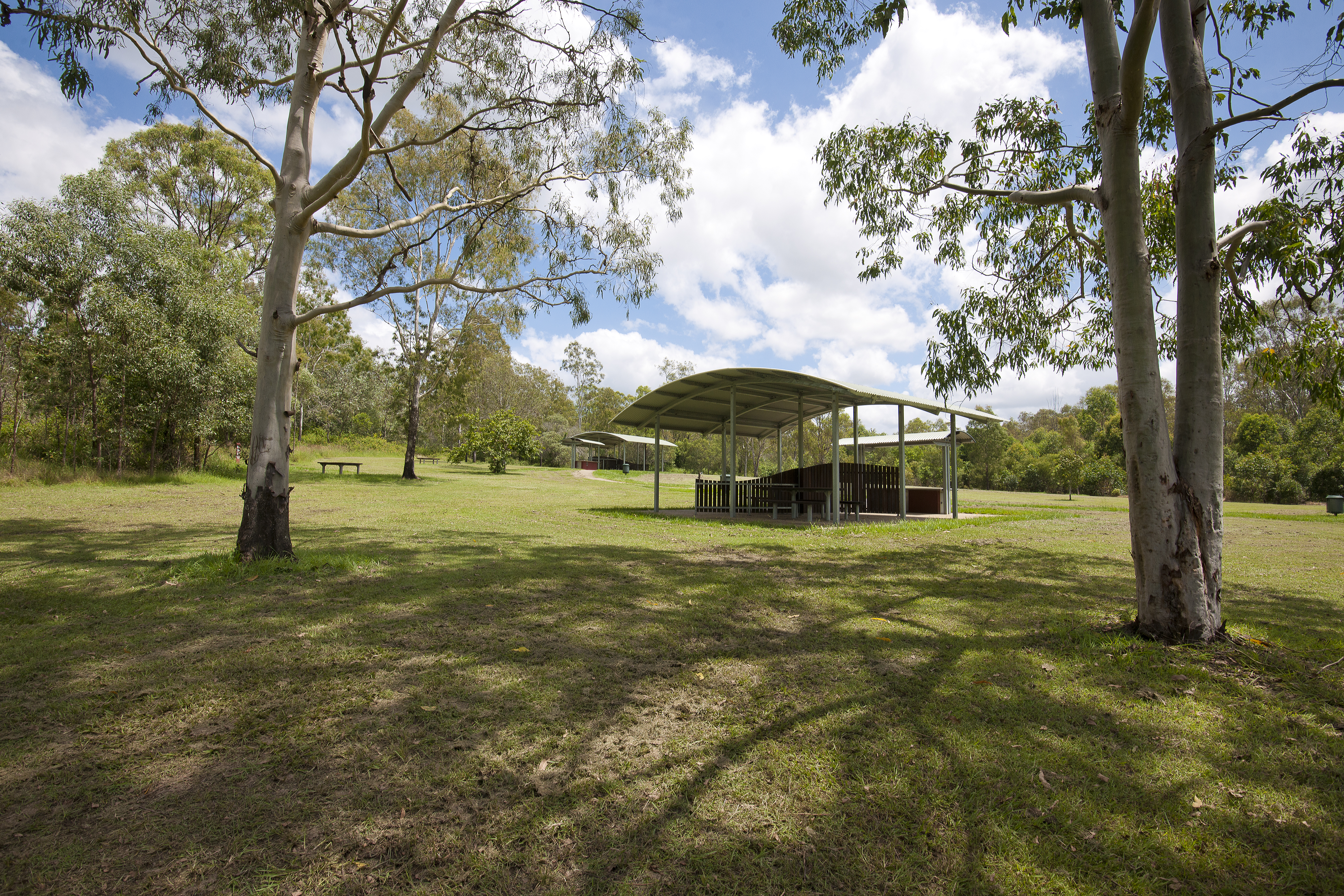
- Anstead Bushland Reserve, 2012

- Interactive map of Anstead
- Coordinates: 27.5411°S 152.8622°E
- Country: Australia
- State: Queensland
- City: Brisbane
- LGA: City of Brisbane (Pullenvale Ward)
- Location: 21.1 km (13.1 mi) WSW of Brisbane CBD
- Established: 1975

Government
  - State electorate: Moggill
  - Federal division: Ryan

Area
  - Total: 14.3 km^{2} (5.5 sq mi)

Population
  - Total: 1,522 (2021 census)
  - Density: 106.4/km^{2} (275.7/sq mi)
- Time zone: UTC+10:00 (AEST)
- Postcode: 4070
Suburbs around Anstead
Kholo; Mount Crosby	Pullenvale	Pullenvale
Karalee	Anstead	Pinjarra Hills
Barellan Point	Moggill	Bellbowrie

Anstead is an outer western suburb in the City of Brisbane, Queensland, Australia. In the 2021 census, Anstead had a population of 1,522 people.

== Geography ==
Anstead is located 21.1 kilometres (13 mi) by road south-west of the Brisbane CBD.

The suburb is bounded to the west by the northern bank of Dalys Reach (27.5544°S 152.8497°E) of the Brisbane River. The Moggill Conservation Park occupies the north of the suburb. Historically a rural area, it is now predominantly rural residential with small areas of land in the west of the suburb being either undeveloped or used for grazing on native vegetation.

Mount Crosby Road runs through from west to east.

== History ==
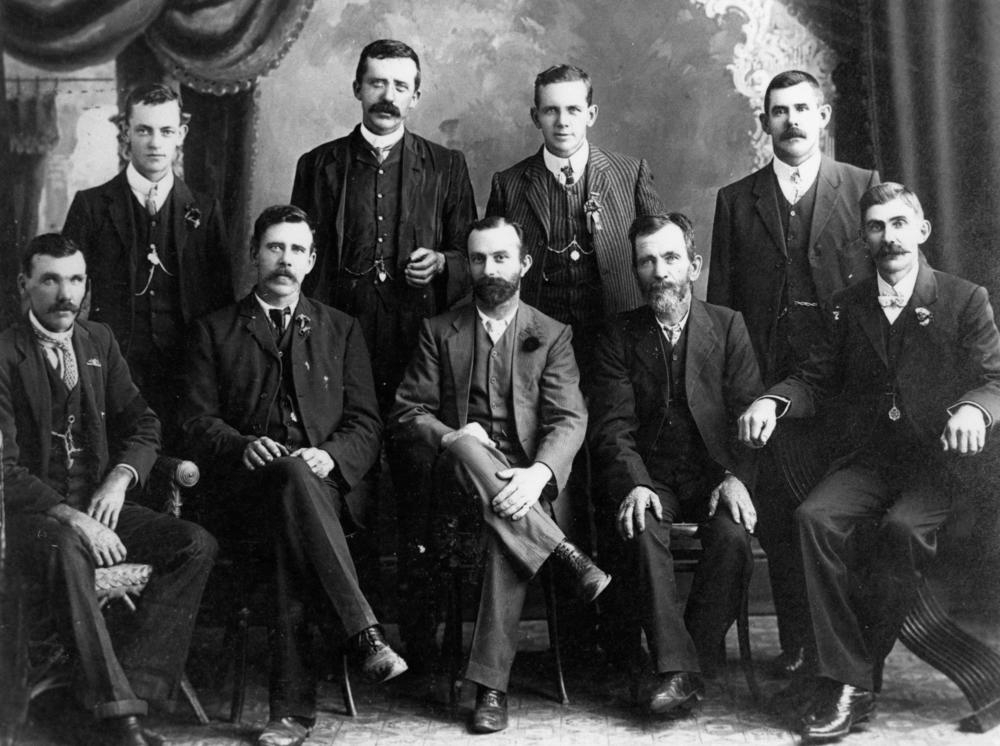
Men of the Anstead family

Anstead is named after the original land owner John Anstead, a timber getter and quarry master in the 1860s. Anstead was officially gazetted in 1975, prior to which it was part of the suburb of Moggill.

== Demographics ==
=== 2016 census ===
In the 2016 census, Anstead had a population of 1,509 people, 50.5% female and 49.5% male. The median age of the Anstead population was 41 years, 3 years above the national median of 38. 72.3% of people were born in Australia. The next most common country of birth was England at 8.5%. 90.1% of people only spoke English at home. The most common responses for religion were No Religion 34.4%, Catholic 19.5%, Anglican 16.3% and Uniting Church 8.8%.

=== 2021 census ===
In the 2021 census, Anstead had a population of 1,522 people, with an equal proportion of females and males (50% each). The median age of the Anstead population was 43 years, 5 years higher the national median of 38. 70.2% of people were born in Australia. The most common religious affiliation was No Religion 45.5%, followed by Catholic 18.9%.

== Education ==
There are no schools in Anstead. The nearest government primary school is Moggill State School in neighbouring Moggill to the south. The nearest government secondary school is Kenmore State High School in Kenmore to the north-east.

== Future road proposal ==
An alternative location for a bridge to replace Moggill Ferry is proposed within the Moggill Pocket Arterial Road Transport Corridor. Land has been set aside by the Queensland government as a future transport corridor passing through the suburbs of Kenmore, Pullenvale, Anstead and Karalee to connect the Centenary Highway at Fig Tree Pocket, Queensland with the Warrego Highway at North Tivoli. The corridor was identified in the 1960s and planned and preserved in the late 1970s. It has not been determined whether or not local traffic on and off-ramp access to the arterial road will be provided. Community feelings over the transport corridor are similar to those expressed over the Moggill Ferry/Bridge debate. As of 2010, there is no date or funding provided to commence the construction of the Moggill Pocket Arterial Road Transport Corridor.
