= Qeblehi =

Qeblehi (Persian: قبله ائ) may refer to:

- Qebleh Ei (disambiguation)
- Qeblehi Rural District, in Khuzestan Province

== See also ==
- Qebleh (disambiguation)
