= Hajji Bakhtiar Rural District =

Rural district in Ilam province, Iran

Hajji Bakhtiar Rural District Persian: دهستان حاجی‌بختیار
- Rural District
- Location within Iran Location within Ilam Province
- Coordinates: 33°43′32″N 46°09′13″E
- Country: Iran
- Province: Ilam
- County: Chavar
- District: Central
- Capital: Chega
- Time zone: UTC+3:30 (IRST)

Hajji Bakhtiar Rural District (Persian: دهستان حاجی‌بختیار) is in the Central DistrictChavar District (Note: Formerly Chavar District of Ilam County) of Chavar County, Ilam province, Iran. Its capital is the village of Chega, whose population at the time of the 2016 National Census was 130 people in 36 households.

== History ==
In 2019, Chavar District (Note: Renamed the Central District of Chavar County) was separated from Ilam County in the establishment of Chavar County and renamed the Central District. Hajji Bakhtiar Rural District was created in the district.
