= Pullenvale =

- Suburb
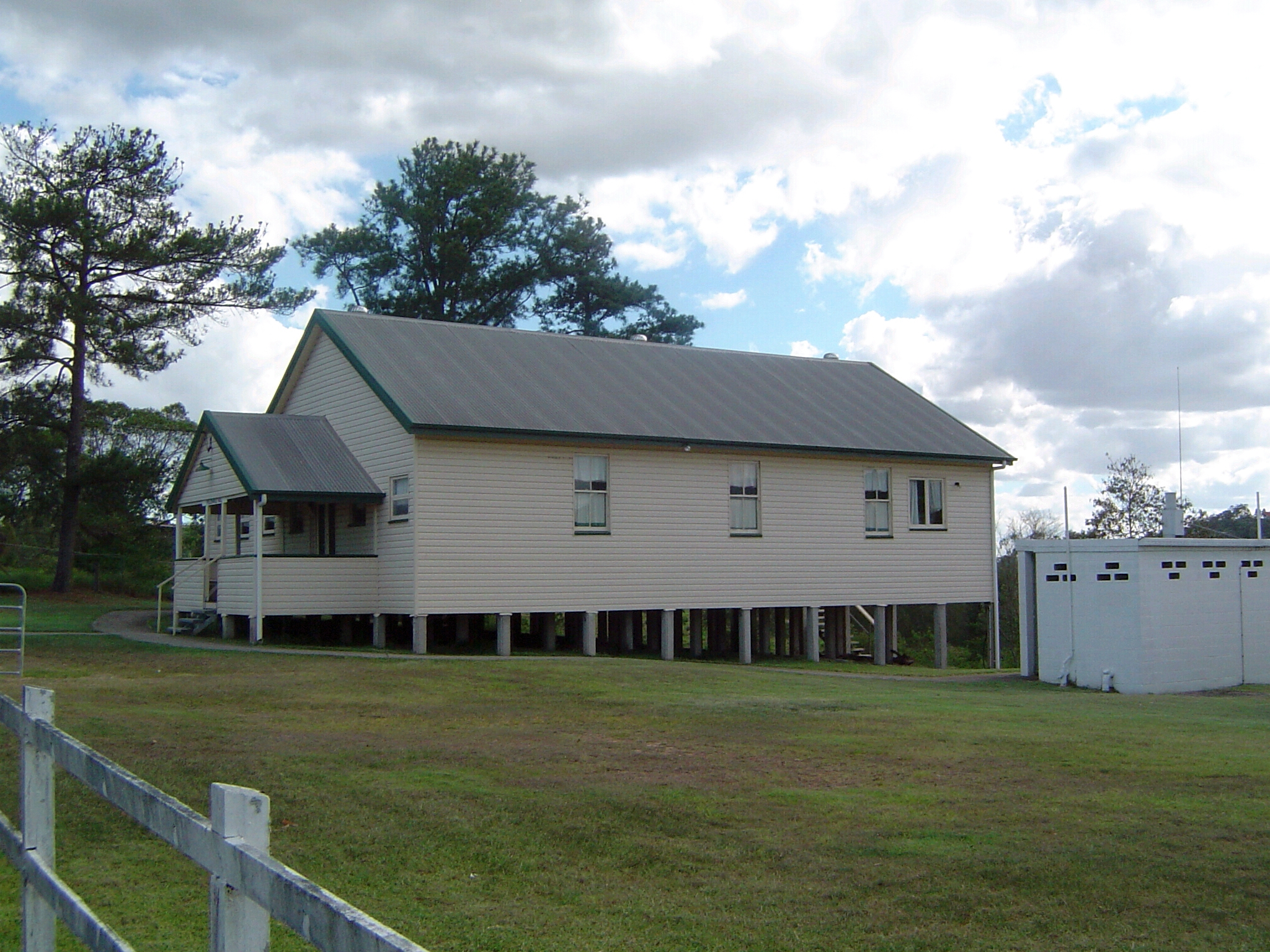
- Pullenvale Hall, 2012

- Interactive map of Pullenvale
- Coordinates: 27.5116°S 152.8766°E
- Country: Australia
- State: Queensland
- City: Brisbane
- LGA: City of Brisbane (Pullenvale Ward)
- Location: 19.3 km (12.0 mi) SW of Brisbane CBD

Government
  - State electorate: Moggill
  - Federal division: Ryan

Area
  - Total: 19.3 km^{2} (7.5 sq mi)

Population
  - Total: 3,276 (2021 census)
  - Density: 169.7/km^{2} (439.6/sq mi)
- Time zone: UTC+10:00 (AEST)
- Postcode: 4069
Suburbs around Pullenvale
Upper Brookfield	Upper Brookfield	Brookfield
Kholo	Pullenvale	Brookfield
Anstead	Pinjarra Hills	Pinjarra Hills

Pullenvale is a rural residential suburb in the City of Brisbane, Queensland, Australia. In the 2021 census, Pullenvale had a population of 3,276 people.

== Geography ==
Mount Elphinstone is in the north of the locality (27.5039°S 152.8967°E) and rises to 211 metres (692 ft) above sea level.

Pullenvale is 19.3 kilometres (12.0 mi) by road south-west of the Brisbane CBD. Located in the southern foothills of Mount Elphinstone, Pullenvale features rolling hills and areas of bush land, and is spread over an area of approximately 19.3 square kilometres (7.5 sq mi).

Apart from a small area of undeveloped land in the north-west of the locality, the land usage is predominantly rural residential housing.

== History ==
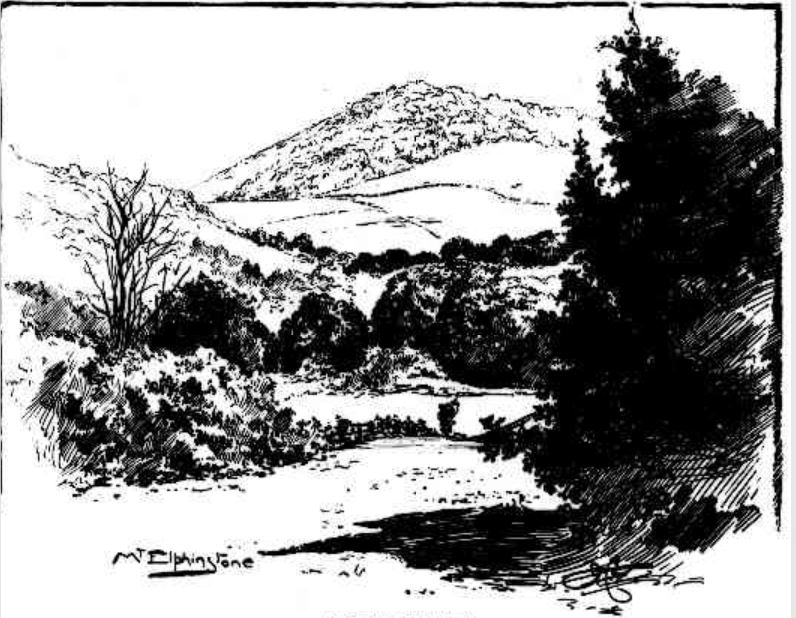
Sketch of Mount Elphinstone, seen from Brookfield, 1893

In 1827, Mount Elphinstone was named by botanist and explorer Allan Cunningham as Mount Halsey, which also appears on some maps as Mount Helsey and Mount Kelsey.

There are a number of theories about the original of the name Pullenvale. One theory from a 1920s newspaper is that it is named after early timbergetter, George Pullen; however, no land records have been found to confirm this. Given that the local creek is known as Pullen Pullen Creek, some people believe the repetition suggests a word from one of the Australian Aboriginal languages possibly meaning "to die" (or "not to die") or "fighting" (or "fighting ground"). Another theory is that the Pullen Pullen name was originally Bullen Bullen, an Aboriginal word meaning "lonely place". In support of the "fighting" theory, there is an 1850 newspaper account:

NATIVE AMUSEMENTS.-The aborigines held a grand "Pullen-Pullen" last week, near Brisbane. Many of the "Ningy-Ningy" and Limestone blacks attended. We are informed that some of them received spear wounds upon the occasion, but no deaths occurred.

The name Glen Pullen predated the name Pullenvale, which is described as a "new name" in 1873. There is an 1873 reference to Glenpullen Farm at Pullenvale.

Pioneer Pullenvale residents developed a logging industry. The construction of Moggill Road, linking Brisbane with Ipswich via Moggill, made the area more accessible. Eventually the logging industry give way to small crop and dairy farming.

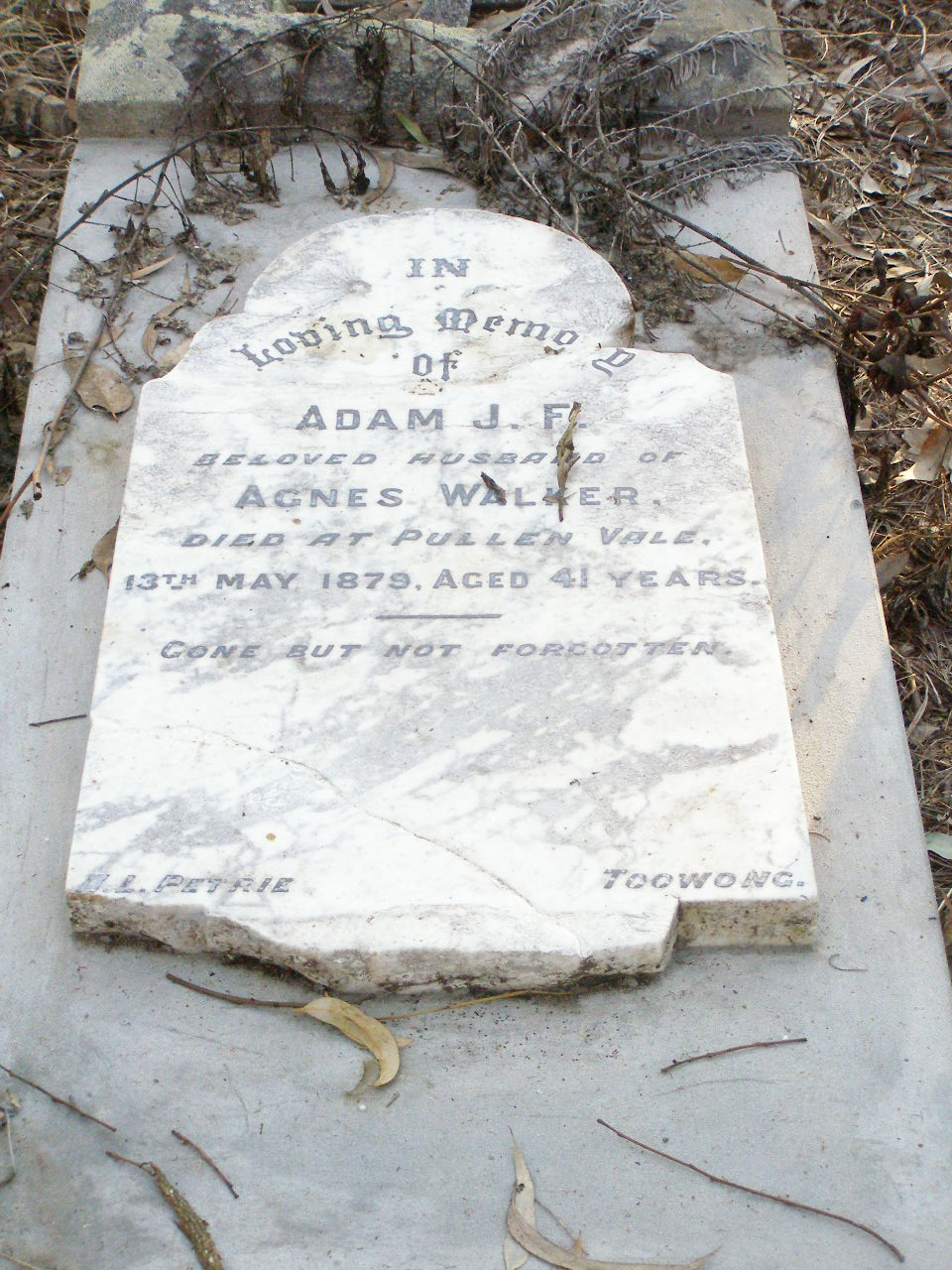
Headstone for Adam James Furley Walker, Pullenvale Cemetery, 2006

On 6 September 1873, 10 acres (4.0 ha) were reserved for a cemetery and four trustees appointed. There were eight burials in the cemetery between 1876 and 1888, which were clustered at the top of a steep hill. There is only one surviving headstone for Adam James Furley Walker. When Greater Brisbane was established in 1925, the Brisbane City Council was made the trustee for the cemetery and closed the cemetery in 1930. Most of the land was sold off apart from the small area with the graves and an access path from Haven Road.

The resulting tiny population of farming families led to the establishment of the Pullenvale State School which opened on 16 March 1874 with an initial enrolment of 32 students. It was noted in the Brisbane Courier of 28 June 1873 that the residents of Pullenvale had, "fairly earned the reputation of being possessed of considerable pluck, having lately accomplished a task of which many older settlements might well be proud that of placing in the Savings Bank the sum of £60 to the oredit of the Board of Education for the purpose of erecting a National School for the benefit of the young Pullenites." A year later it was reported in The Queenslander that there was now, "a fine school and teacher's residence, and an average daily attendance of thirty children (which by the way might be increased by a little salutary compulsion)." It was not until 1981 that the State School was rebuilt in Grandview Road to cater for a great increase in population that stemmed from the encroaching Brisbane metropolis. In 2015 the school was granted Independent Public School status.

Pullenvale Hall is a former pineapple packing shed. The building was purchased from resident Jack Woodward in about 1943.

Moggill Pony Club was formed in April 1961. It is one of the oldest pony clubs in Queensland.

Brisbane Independent School opened in a church hall in St Lucia on 19 August 1968. It was established by parents who were looking for a different style of education for their children where they could pursue their own creativity and ideas. The school relocated to Pullenvale in 1972 on land donated by the Job family.

== Demographics ==
In the 2011 census, Pullenvale had a population of 3,174 people, 49.8% female and 50.2% male. The median age of the Pullenvale population was 39 years, 2 years above the Australian median. 68.2% of people living in Pullenvale were born in Australia, compared to the national average of 69.8%; the next most common countries of birth were England 10.3%, South Africa 4.6%, New Zealand 2.4%, United States of America 1.4%, Scotland 1.1%. 91.2% of people spoke only English at home; the next most common languages were 1.1% Afrikaans, 0.7% German, 0.6% Japanese, 0.5% Mandarin, 0.4% Cantonese.

In the 2016 census, Pullenvale had a population of 3,179 people.

In the 2021 census, Pullenvale had a population of 3,276 people.

== Heritage listings ==
There are a number of heritage-listed sites in Pullenvale:

- Pullenvale Cemetery, 243A Haven Road (27.5017°S 152.8926°E)

== Economy ==
The CSIRO have their Queensland Centre for Advanced Technologies at 1 Technology Drive (off Bainbridge Street) in Pullenvale, although the campus is extends into neighbouring Pinjarra Hills.

Queensland Centre for Advanced Technologies (QCAT) is an integrated research and development precinct for the resources and advanced technology industries.

== Education ==
Pullenvale State School is a government primary (Prep-6) school for boys and girls at 120 Grandview Road (27.5326°S 152.8953°E). In 2014 the school recorded 387 students. In 2018, the school had an enrolment of 437 students with 35 teachers (27 full-time equivalent) and 18 non-teaching staff (11 full-time equivalent).

Brisbane Independent School is a private primary (Prep-6) school for boys and girls at 2,447 Moggill Road (27.5241°S 152.9187°E). In 2018, the school had an enrolment of 86 students with 7 teachers (6 full-time equivalent) and 10 non-teaching staff (6 full-time equivalent).

Pullenvale Environmental Education Centre is an Outdoor and Environmental Education Centre at 250 Grandview Road (27.5258°S 152.8886°E). It is on the previous site of the Pullenvale State School where the old Pullenvale State School building still stands.

There are no government secondary school in Pullenvale. The nearest government secondary school is Kenmore State High School in Kenmore to the east.

== Facilities ==
Pullenvale Fire Station is at 6 Pullenvale Road (27.5213°S 152.9214°E).

== Amenities ==
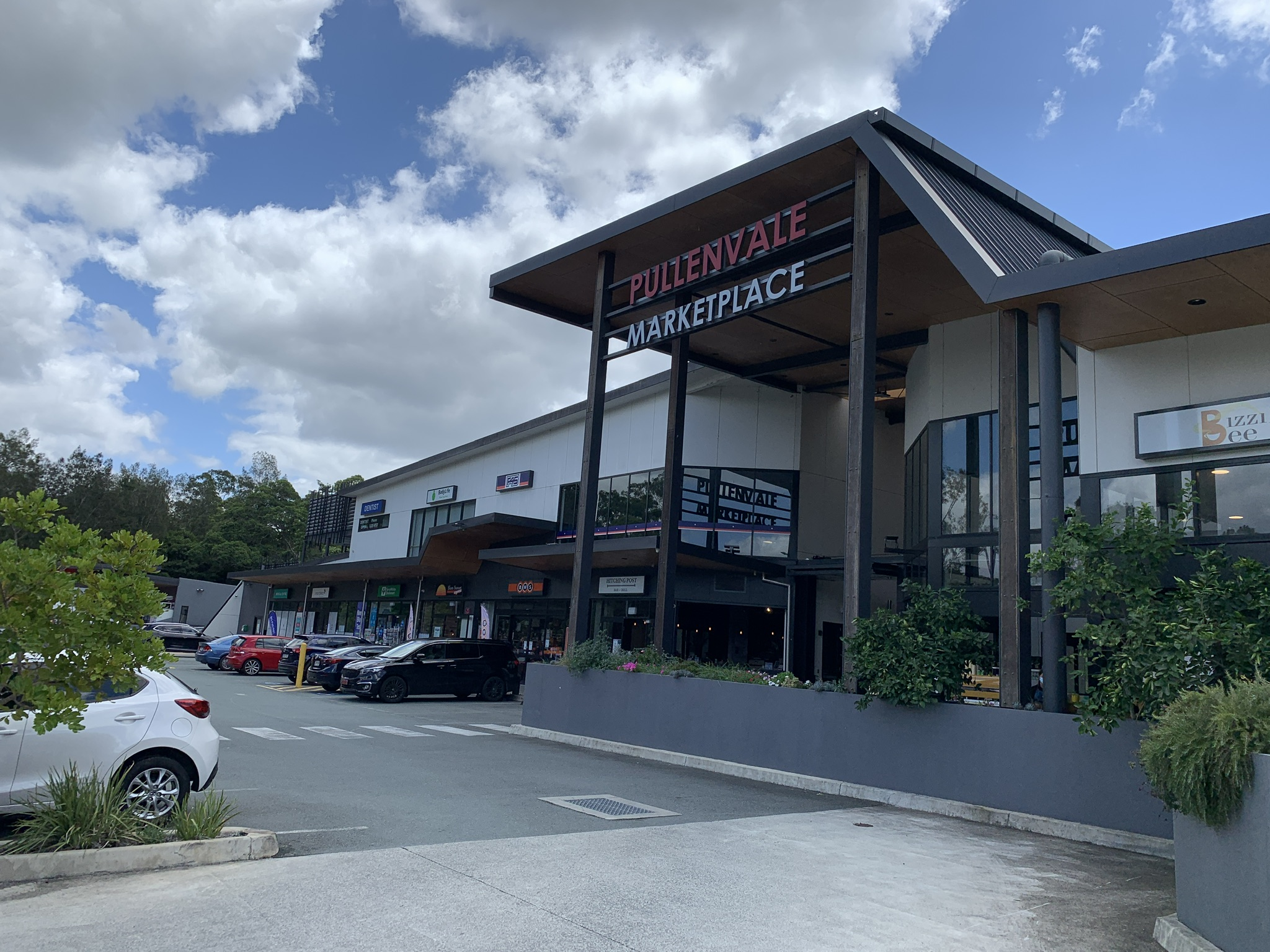
Pullenvale Marketplace, 2022

Pullenvale Marketplace is a shopping centre at 8 McCaskill Road (27.5297°S 152.9098°E), anchored by an IGA supermarket.

Pullenvale Hall is at 302 Grandview Road (27.5236°S 152.8863°E). It is the centre of many small functions and classes run by the Pullenvale Progress Association.

Despite its name, Moggill Pony Club is on 4 hectares (9.9 acres) of land at 41 O'Brien Road in Pullenvale (27.5372°S 152.8869°E).

There are a number of parks in the area:

- Airlie Road Park (27.5327°S 152.8922°E)
- Grandview Road Park (27.5315°S 152.8967°E)
- Lancing Street Park (27.5372°S 152.8917°E)
- Mccaskill Road Park (27.5302°S 152.9085°E)
- Primley Street Park (27.5298°S 152.8706°E)
- Pullenvale Forest Park (27.5248°S 152.8926°E)
- Pullenvale Recreation Reserve (27.5201°S 152.9199°E)
- Woodward Place Park (27.5221°S 152.8806°E)
