= Monica Mayhem =

Australian pornographic actress, dancer & singer (born 1978)

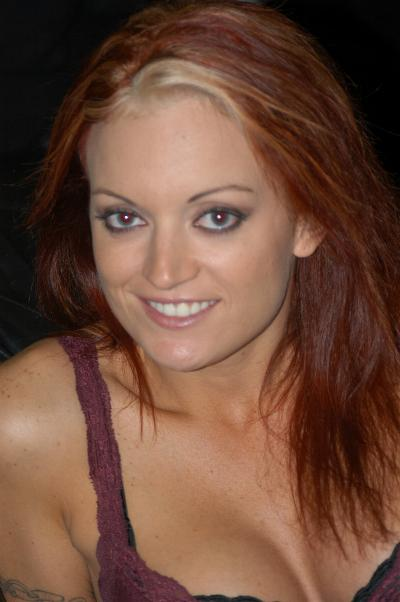
- Mayhem in 2007
- Born: 14 March 1978 (age 48); Brisbane, Queensland, Australia
- Height: 5 ft 5 in (1.65 m)
- Website: monicamayhem.com

Monica Mayhem (born 14 March 1978) is an Australian former pornographic actress, dancer and singer.

== Early life ==
Mayhem was born in Brisbane, Queensland, Australia and she is half Australian and half Welsh. She attended Kenmore State High School but was expelled. Prior to working in porn, she worked in financial markets and futures trading in Sydney. She then moved to London and worked in an International Petroleum Exchange brokerage.

== Career ==
Mayhem began her career in the adult entertainment industry as a dancer at the Spearmint Rhino on Tottenham Court Road. Her first scene was with Lee Stone in Real Sex Magazine 38. In 2002, she won the XRCO Award for Starlet of the Year and the FOXE Award for "Vixen of the Year".

Outside pornographic films, Mayhem was a singer/guitarist in the all-girl metal band "Sweet Avenge".

In 2008, she appeared in a small role in the Sex and the City film, in which she is seen through a window having sex with Samantha's neighbour Dante.

Mayhem wrote an autobiography titled Absolute Mayhem: Confessions of an Aussie Porn Star, which was released by Random House Australia in 2009 in her native Australia and by Skyhorse Publishing in North America the following year.

In August 2010, she announced that she had retired from pornographic acting, after over 400 films, and that she was engaged to a Sydney veterinarian.
