= Qibleh =

Qibleh may refer to:

- Qibla, the Muslim direction for prayer
- Qiblih, a Bahá'í direction for prayer

== See also ==
- Qebleh (disambiguation)
