= Buli District =

District in Ilam province, Iran

Buli District Persian: بخش بولی
- District
- Location within Iran Location within Ilam Province
- Coordinates: 33°41′56″N 45°54′01″E
- Country: Iran
- Province: Ilam
- County: Chavar
- Capital: Ganjevan
- Time zone: UTC+3:30 (IRST)

Buli District (Persian: بخش بولی) is in Chavar County, Ilam province, Iran. Its capital is the village of Ganjevan, whose population at the time of the 2016 National Census was 292 people in 80 households.

== History ==
In 2019, Chavar District (Note: Renamed the Central District of Chavar County) was separated from Ilam County in the establishment of Chavar County and renamed the Central District. The new county was divided into two districts of two rural districts each, with Chavar as its capital and only city at the time.

== Demographics ==
=== Administrative divisions ===
Buli District
Administrative Divisions
Buli RD
Chakor RD
RD = Rural District
