= Mount Crosby =

- Suburb
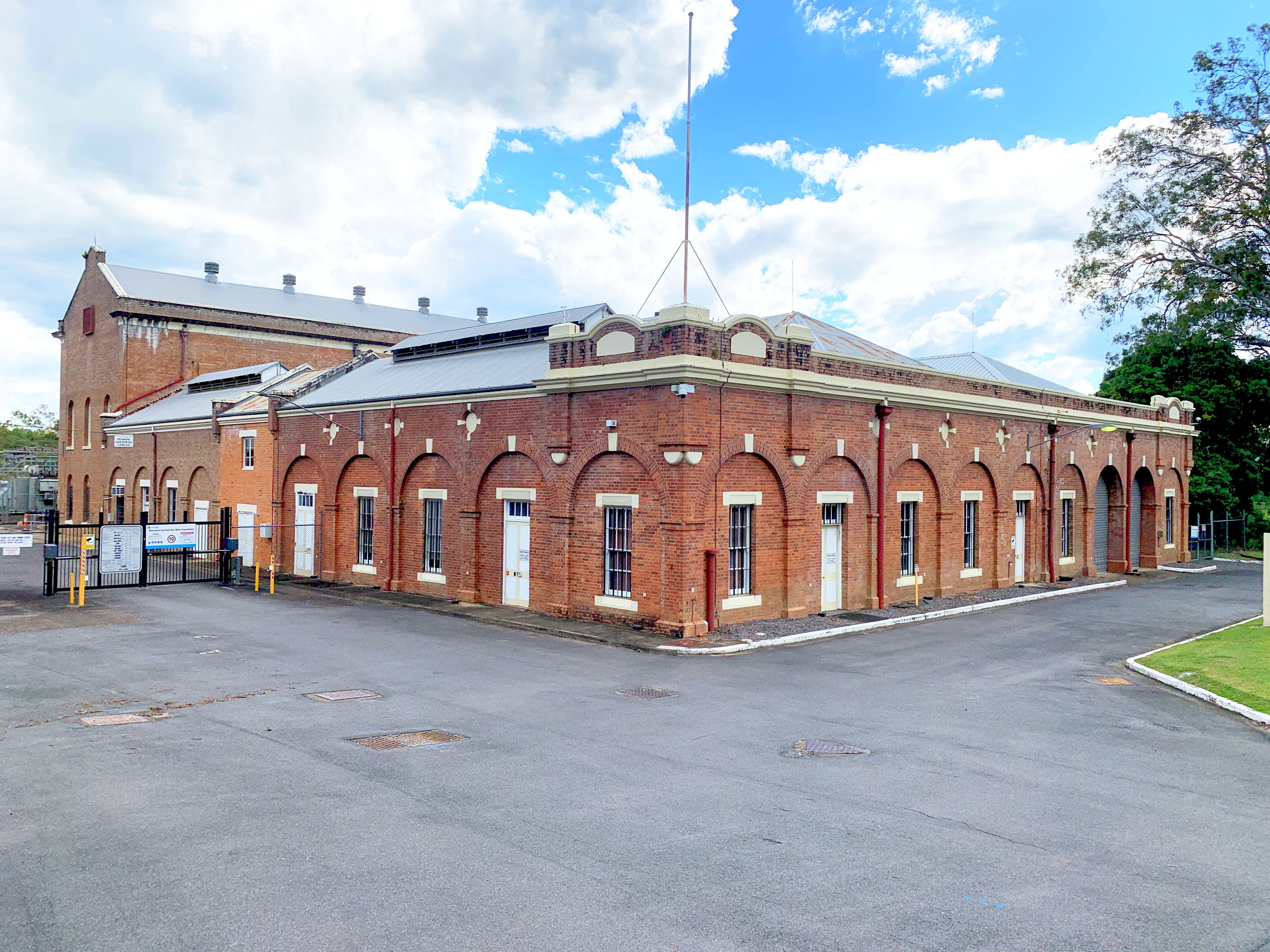
- Mount Crosby pumping station, 2022

- Interactive map of Mount Crosby
- Coordinates: 27.5230°S 152.8119°E
- Country: Australia
- State: Queensland
- City: Brisbane
- LGA: City of Brisbane
- Location: 10.7 km (6.6 mi) NE of Ipswich CBD; 30.1 km (18.7 mi) WSW of Brisbane CBD

Government
  - State electorate: Moggill
  - Federal division: Blair

Area
  - Total: 15.3 km^{2} (5.9 sq mi)

Population
  - Total: 1,860 (2021 census)
  - Density: 121.6/km^{2} (314.9/sq mi)
- Time zone: UTC+10:00 (AEST)
- Postcode: 4306
Suburbs around Mount Crosby
Kholo	Kholo	Anstead
Kholo	Mount Crosby	Anstead
Chuwar	Karana Downs	Karalee

Mount Crosby is a semi-rural outer western locality in the City of Brisbane, Queensland, Australia. In the 2021 census, Mount Crosby had a population of 1,860 people.

== Geography ==
The locality of Mount Crosby is bounded to the south-west and south by the Brisbane River (known by locals as the "Devil's elbow"), to the south-east by Mount Crosby Road and a second section of the Brisbane River, and to the north by Lake Manchester Road and Swensons Road. It is 22 kilometres (14 mi) south-west of the Brisbane CBD.

Mount Crosby has the following mountains:

- Holts Hill (27.5226°S 152.8085°E) 65 metres (213 ft) above sea level
- Mount Crosby (also known as Mount Belle Vue) (27.5281°S 152.7989°E) 183 metres (600 ft) above sea level

Colleges Crossing (27.5564°S 152.8036°E) is a historic ford on the Brisbane River, now replaced by a low-level bridge.

== History ==
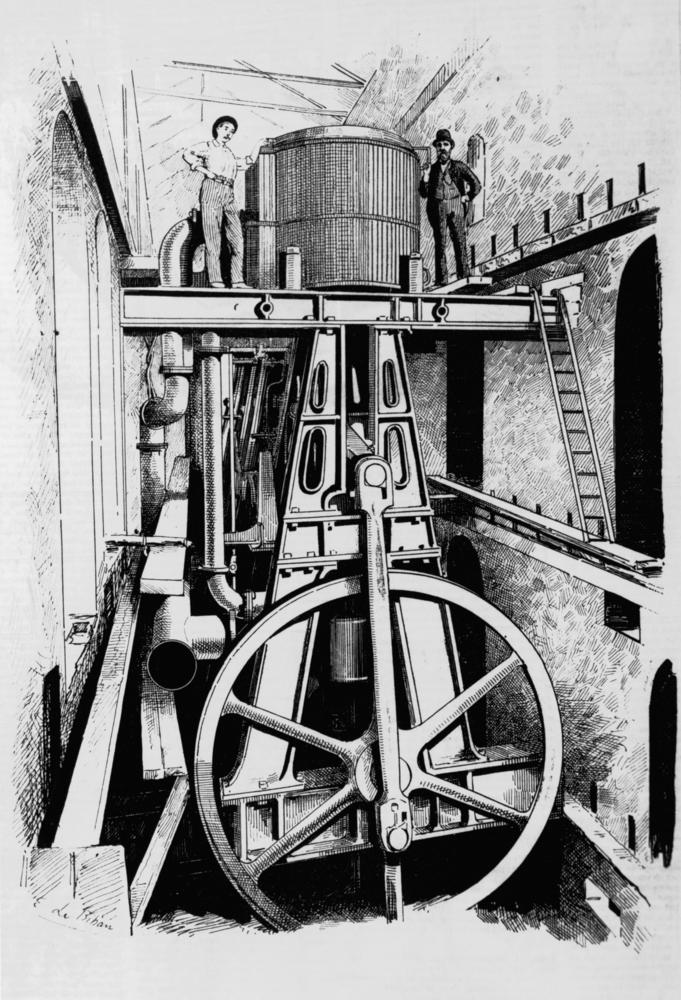
Pumping engine at the Mount Crosby waterworks, 2017

The Jagera Aboriginal people inhabited areas in Mount Crosby and they had ceremonial grounds on the slopes of Mount Elphinstone and at Bellbowrie.

John Oxley explored the Brisbane River in September 1824. He and Lieutenant Butler climbed the mountain (now known as Mount Crosby) naming it Belle Vue Mountain. The origin of the current name is uncertain, but there are two theories. The first theory is that first farmers to take up land in the area came from Crosbie-on-Eden on the England-Scotland border and they named the mountain Mount Crosbie. The second theory is that a gold prospector George Crosby worked here in the early days.

In 1824, Allan Cunningham explored a shallow part of the Brisbane River (27.5564°S 152.8036°E) at the south-eastern corner of the present-day locality of Mount Crosby. This ford was later named Colleges Crossing after farmer George College or Colledge (his name was spelled with both variants) who immigrated to Brisbane on the ship Artemisia in 1849 and acquired land in the area circa 1852.

The Crosby postal receiving office opened on 1 January 1882; it was renamed Mount Crosby receiving office in June 1917. It became a full post office in about 1924.

In May 1881, tenders were called for the erection of a provisional school in Lower Kholo (now Mount Crosby). Mount Crosby Provisional School opened on 30 January 1882 with 22 pupils under teacher Arthur Leigh. It closed on 31 December 1892, but soon reopened on 11 September 1893 as Mount Crosby State School under head teacher Samuel Rea. This original school was located at 655 Mount Crosby Road and is now heritage-listed.

The Mount Crosby Pumping Station and the first Mount Crosby weir opened in 1892 to supply water to Brisbane. A small village was established to accommodate the workers, consisting of 60 cottages and other facilities such as a church/hall, store, and bowls club.

A tramway was built from Tivoli to convey coal from the Ipswich Coalfield to the station.

In the early 1940s, about 40 acres (16 ha) of land was sold to Scouts Australia. This was developed as the Tyamolum Scout Camp.

On 13 May 1948, Queensland Premier Ned Hanlon officially opened the first section of the Mount Crosby East Bank Water Treatment Plant.

The Autism Therapy & Education Centre opened on 1 March 1985 and closed on 5 June 2003. It was a school and therapy centre for children with autism.

Kholo, Mount Crosby and Karana Downs were transferred from the City of Ipswich to become part of the City of Brisbane in 2000.

== Demographics ==
In the 2011 census, the population of Mount Crosby was 1,728, 49.9% female and 50.1% male. The median age of the Mount Crosby population was 37 years of age. 74.2% of people living in Mount Crosby were born in Australia, compared to the national average of 69.8%; the next most common countries of birth were England 7.2%, South Africa 3.2%, New Zealand 2.9%, United States of America 0.9%, Germany 0.8%. 90.5% of people spoke only English at home; the next most common languages were 0.8% German, 0.6% Afrikaans, 0.5% Russian, 0.3% Persian (excluding Dari), 0.3% Mandarin.

In the 2016 census, the population of Mount Crosby was 1,832, 50.6% female and 49.4% male. The median age of the Mount Crosby population was 39 years of age. 72.9% of people living in Mount Crosby were born in Australia, compared to the national average of 66.7%; the next most common countries of birth were England 6.9%, South Africa 3.3%, New Zealand 2.9%, Germany 1.1%, United States of America 0.7%. 90.6% of people spoke only English at home; the next most common languages were Afrikaans 1.1%, German 1%, Mandarin 0.8%, Dutch 0.4%, Persian (excluding Dari) 0.4%.

In the 2021 census, Mount Crosby had a population of 1,860 people.

== Heritage listings ==
Mount Crosby has a number of heritage-listed sites, including:

- Waterworks Cottage No. 121, 1 Brady Court
- Waterworks Cottage No. 122, 2 Brady Court
- Waterworks Cottage No. 123, 4 Brady Court
- Waterworks Cottage No. 124, 6 Brady Court
- Waterworks Cottage No. 125, 10 Brady Court
- Waterworks Cottage No. 126, 16 Brady Court
- Waterworks Cottage No. 127, 18 Brady Court
- Waterworks Cottage No. 128, 20 Brady Court
- Shift Operator's House at Holt's Hill Plant (also known as Waterworks Cottage No. 1), 97 Lake Manchester Road
- Holt's Hill Entrance Avenue Trees, 97 Lake Manchester Road
- Holt's & Cameron Hill Reservoir & Filtration Plant, 97 Lake Manchester Road
- Burrows House & Fig Tree, 570 Mount Crosby Road
- former Mount Crosby State School and Residence, 655 Mount Crosby Road (27.5408°S 152.8058°E)
- Mount Crosby General Store & Post Office, 659 Mount Crosby Road
- Waterworks Cottage No. 129, 663 Mount Crosby Road
- Waterworks Cottage No. 130, 667 Mount Crosby Road
- Waterworks Cottage No. 133, 671 Mount Crosby Road
- Mount Crosby Community Hall, 770 Mount Crosby Road
- Waterworks Cottage No. 114, 1 Scriven Street
- Work residence, 5 Scriven Street
- Work residence, 6 Scriven Street
- Work residence, 8 Scriven Street
- Work residence, 20 Scriven Street
- Waterworks Cottage No. 117, 27 Scriven Street
- Waterworks Cottage No. 139, 10 Stumers Road
- Waterworks Cottage No. 113, 16 Stumers Road
- Waterworks Cottages No. 103 & 104, 24 Stumers Road
- Waterworks Cottages No. 105 & 106, 24 Stumers Road (27.5379°S 152.8008°E):
- Waterworks Cottages No. 107 & 108, 24 Stumers Road (27.5382°S 152.8011°E)
- Waterworks Cottages No. 109 & 110, 24 Stumers Road (27.5384°S 152.8014°E)
- Waterworks Cottage No. 112, 24 Stumers Road (27.5384°S 152.8022°E)
- Mount Crosby Pumping Station, 58 Stumers Road (27.5380°S 152.7991°E)
- Waterworks Cottage No. 102 (also known as Drayman's cottage), 58 Stumers Road
- Mount Crosby Weir & Old Bridge Foundations, adjacent 58B Stumers Road (27.5373°S 152.7979°E)
- Mount Crosby Low Level Treatment Works, 97 Stumers Road (27.5297°S 152.8029°E)
- Mount Crosby High Level Reservoir, 97 Stumers Road
- Fig Tree, 57 Wattle Street

== Education ==
There are no schools in Mount Crosby. Despite the name, Mount Crosby State School is a government co-education primary (P-6) school located on the eastern side of Mount Crosby Road in neighbouring Karana Downs (27.550919°S 152.807199°E). The nearest government secondary school is Ipswich State High School in Brassall in Ipswich to the south-west.

== Facilities ==
The locality has a major role in the supply of water to Brisbane, including:

- Mount Crosby Wier and Pumping Station on Stumer Road
- Mount Crosby Eastbank Water Treatment Plant (27.5292°S 152.8033°E)
- Camerons Hill Reservoirs (27.5233°S 152.8086°E)

There is an SES Unit at 24 Stumers Road (27.5379°S 152.8008°E).

== Amenities ==
Mount Crosby is serviced by a fortnightly visit of the Brisbane City Council's mobile library service outside the Mount Crosby State School on Mountt Crosby Road.

Mount Crosby Bowls Club is at 770 Mount Crosby Road (27.5380°S 152.8037°E).

Mount Crosby Post Office is at 659 Mount Crosby Road, part of the general store (27.5406°S 152.8054°E).

Tyamolum Scout Park and Camping Ground is at 31 Bunya Street (27.5257°S 152.8428°E). It has one building providing bunk-house style accommodation with kitchen, dining and uni-sex bathroom facilities. It also provides several areas for tent camping

There are a number of parks in the locality, including:

- Banksia Drive Reserve (27.5181°S 152.8166°E)
- Bullock Dray Road Park (27.5203°S 152.8248°E)
- Jack Kerr Court Park (27.5140°S 152.8232°E)
- Malcolm Mcdougall Park (27.5409°S 152.7992°E)
- Platypus Park (27.5250°S 152.8179°E)
- Scriven Street Reserve (27.5420°S 152.8030°E)
- Stumers Road Reserve (27.5364°S 152.8041°E)
- Swensons Road Nature Reserve (27.5167°S 152.8280°E)

== See also ==
- List of tramways in Queensland
