= Buli Rural District =

Rural district in Ilam province, Iran

Buli Rural District Persian: دهستان بولی
- Rural District
- Location within Iran Location within Ilam Province
- Coordinates: 33°44′58″N 45°53′23″E
- Country: Iran
- Province: Ilam
- County: Chavar
- District: Buli
- Capital: Chaman-e Seyyed Mohammad

Population (2016)
  - Total: 1,021
- Time zone: UTC+3:30 (IRST)

Buli Rural District (Persian: دهستان بولی) is in Buli District of Chavar County, Ilam province, Iran. Its capital is the village of Chaman-e Seyyed Mohammad. The previous capital of the rural district was the village of Ganjevan.

== Demographics ==
=== Population ===
At the time of the 2006 National Census, the rural district's population (as a part of Chavar District (Note: Renamed the Central District of Chavar County) in Ilam County) was 1,646 in 363 households. There were 1,551 inhabitants in 353 households at the following census of 2011. The 2016 census measured the population of the rural district as 1,021 in 275 households. The most populous of its 28 villages was Ganjevan, with 292 people.

In 2019, the district was separated from the county in the establishment of Chavar County and renamed the Central District. The rural district was transferred to the new Buli District.

== See also ==
- Sumar District
- Ilam
