= Electoral district of Moggill =

State electoral district of Queensland, Australia

Moggill Queensland—Legislative Assembly
- Electoral map of Moggill 2017
- State: Queensland
- MP: Christian Rowan
- Party: Liberal National
- Namesake: Moggill
- Electors: 34,935 (2020)
- Area: 307 km^{2} (118.5 sq mi)
- Demographic: Outer-metropolitan
- Coordinates: 27°28′S 152°49′E
Electorates around Moggill:
Nanango	Pine Rivers	Cooper
Lockyer	Moggill	Maiwar
Ipswich West	Bundamba; Inala	Mount Ommaney

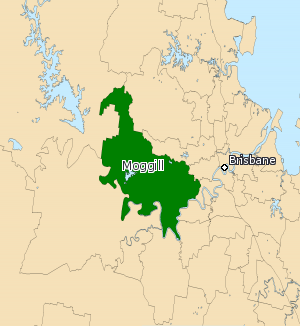
Electoral map of Moggill 2008

Moggill is an electoral district in the Legislative Assembly of Queensland in the state of Queensland, Australia. The electorate is held by Dr Christian Rowan, for the Liberal National Party of Queensland.

Moggill encompasses the suburbs on the south-western fringe of Brisbane, and is named for the suburb of Moggill. It also includes Chapel Hill, Pullenvale, Brookfield, Kenmore, Karana Downs and Mount Crosby. It had long been the most conservative seat in Brisbane. Indeed, during the Labor landslides of 2001 and 2004, it was the only non-Labor seat in Brisbane.

However, in recent years, it has become somewhat more marginal. At its height in 2012, the LNP sat on a majority of 23.9 percent, which was pared back to 8.2 percent in 2015, five percent in 2017 and three percent in 2020. It returned to 5.63 percent in 2024. Presently, it is one of only nine LNP seats in the capital.

Most of the seat is located within the federal seat of Ryan.

== History ==
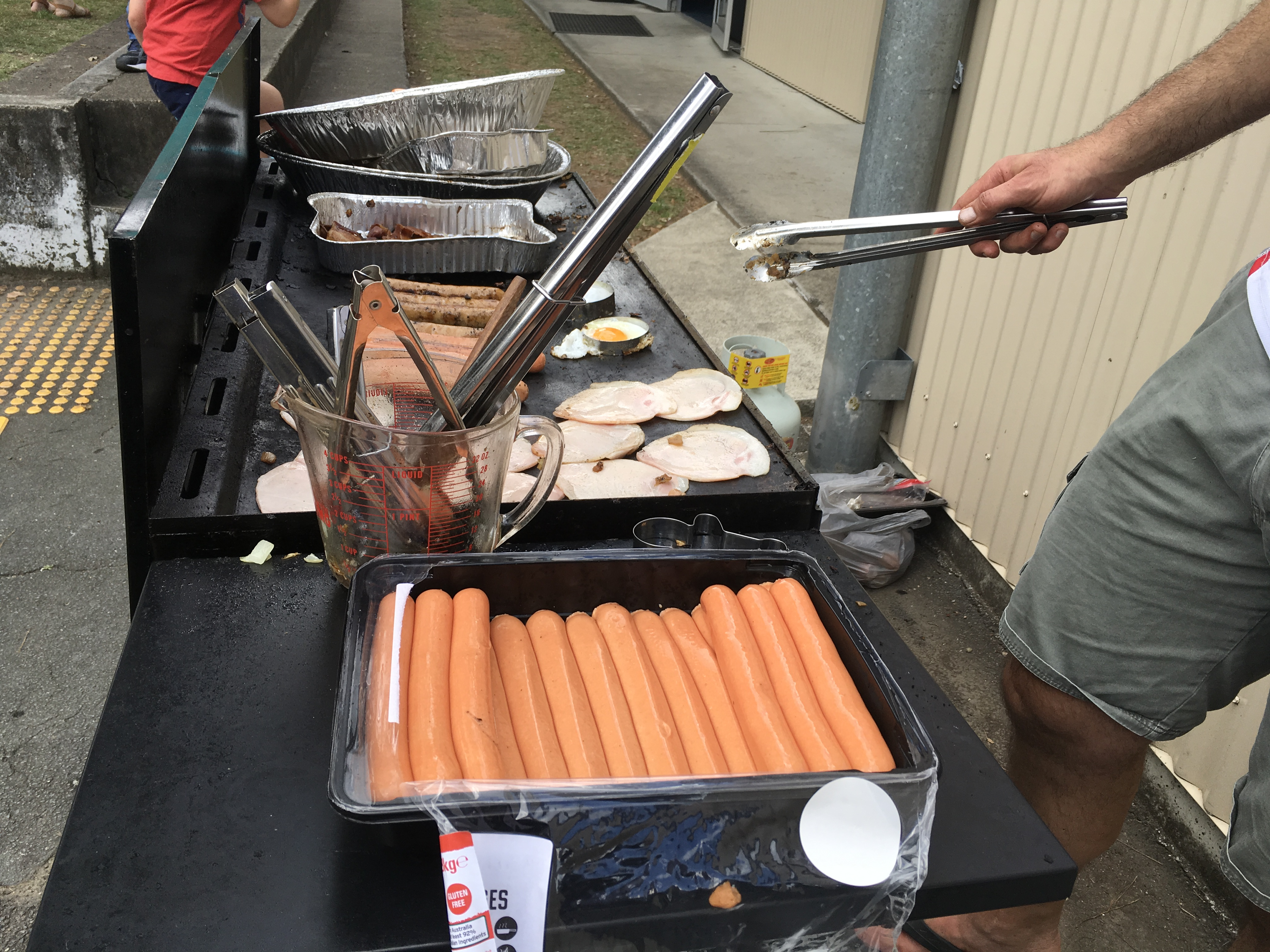
Democracy sausages being barbecued at Kenmore State School in the electoral district of Moggill, 2017 Queensland state election, 25 November 2017

The electoral district of Moggill was created in the 1986 redistribution combining part of the electoral district of Mount Coot-tha with parts of the electoral district of Ipswich West. In 1991, a small portion east of the Centenary Highway was removed.

== Members for Moggill ==
Member	Party	Term
Bill Lickiss	Liberal	1986–1989
David Watson	Liberal	1989–2004
Bruce Flegg	Liberal	2004–2008
Bruce Flegg	Liberal National	2008–2015
Christian Rowan	Liberal National	2015–present

== Election results ==
2024 Queensland state election: Moggill
Party	Candidate	Votes	%	±%
Liberal National	Christian Rowan	16,003	48.51	+1.61
Labor	Eric Richman	8,655	26.24	−2.16
Greens	Andrew Kidd	6,768	20.52	−0.06
One Nation	Cheryl Wood	1,562	4.73	+1.83
Total formal votes		32,988	97.8	
Informal votes		727	2.2	
Turnout		33,715	91.20	
Two-party-preferred result
Liberal National	Christian Rowan	18,350	55.63	+2.03
Labor	Eric Richman	14,638	44.37	−2.03
Liberal National hold		Swing	+2.03	

Primary vote results in Moggill (Parties that have never gotten 5% of the vote are omitted)
Liberal National

Liberal
Country/National

Labor
Greens
Australian Democrats
Katter's Australian
Independent
View source data.
Two-candidate-preferred vote results in Moggill View source data.
