= Arkavazi Rural District =

Rural district in Ilam province, Iran

Arkavazi Rural District Persian: دهستان اركوازئ
- Rural District
- Location within Iran Location within Ilam Province
- Coordinates: 33°42′15″N 46°21′35″E
- Country: Iran
- Province: Ilam
- County: Chavar
- District: Central
- Capital: Murt

Population (2016)
  - Total: 3,702
- Time zone: UTC+3:30 (IRST)

Arkavazi Rural District (Persian: دهستان اركوازئ) is in the Central District (Note: Formerly Chavar District of Ilam County) of Chavar County, Ilam province, Iran. Its capital is the village of Murt.

== Demographics ==
=== Population ===
At the time of the 2006 National Census, the rural district's population (as a part of Chavar District (Note: Renamed the Central District of Chavar County) in Ilam County) was 4,640 in 935 households. There were 4,384 inhabitants in 1,006 households at the following census of 2011. The 2016 census measured the population of the rural district as 3,702 in 915 households. The most populous of its 51 villages was Murt, with 1,088 people.

In 2019, the district was separated from the county in the establishment of Chavar County and renamed the Central District.
