= Kenmore State High School =

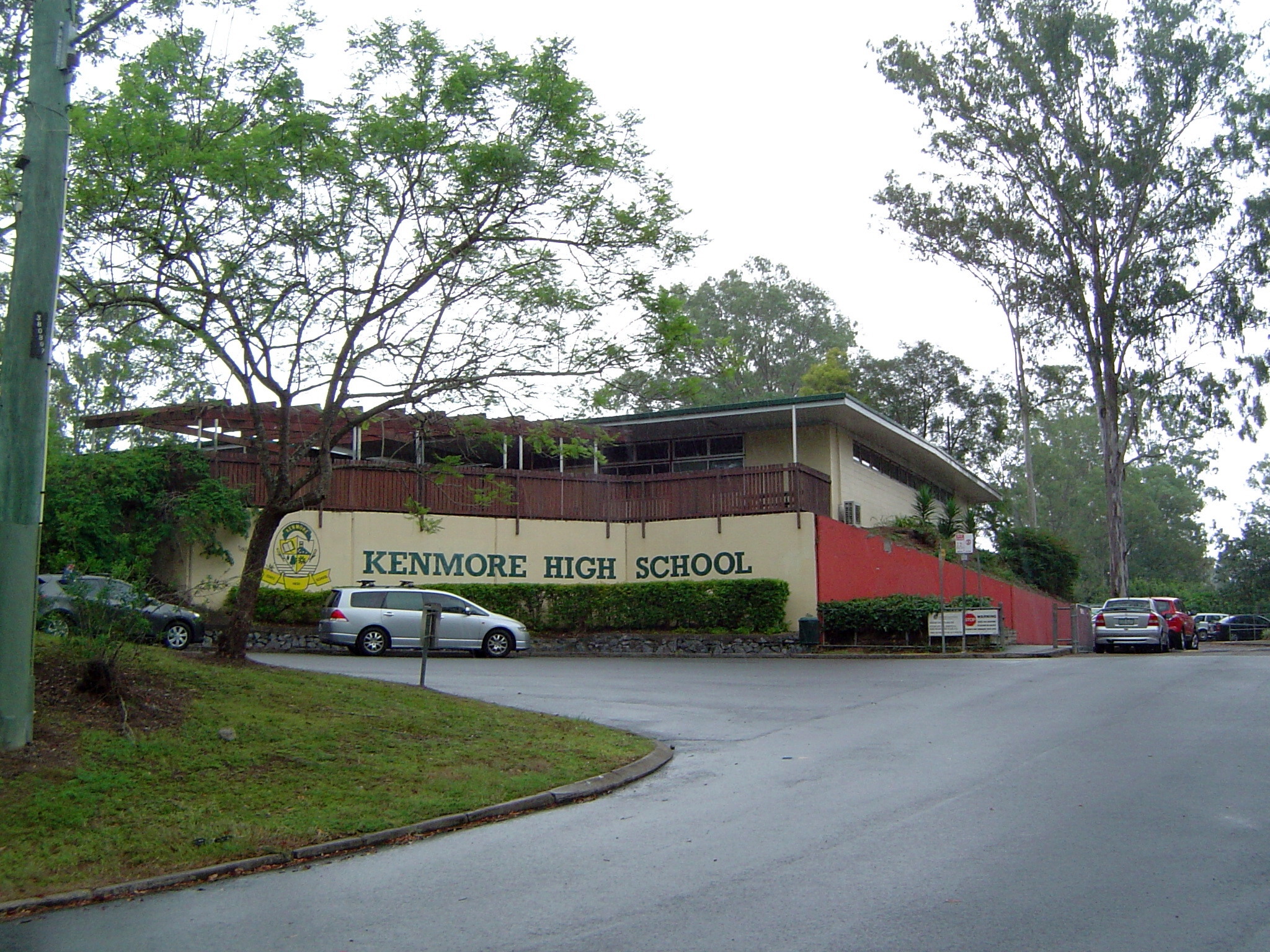
- Entrance in Mabb Street

Location
- Kenmore, Queensland; Australia; 27.5082°S 152.9294°E

Information
- Type: Public school
- Motto: Education For Life
- Established: 1972
- Principal: Paul Robertson
- Staff: 153 teaching and 57 non-teaching staff, five deputy principals, and eleven heads of department
- Grades: 7–12
- Enrolment: 1,960 (2020)
- Colors: Green and gold
- Website: kenmoreshs.eq.edu.au

Kenmore State High School is a government secondary school in the suburb of Kenmore of Brisbane, Queensland, Australia. It has been accredited by the Council of International Schools (Australia).

== History ==
The school opened in 1972 as a Years 8–12 school with its first students graduating from Year 12 in 1976. In 2015, Year 7 schooling was moved from primary schools into secondary schools with Kenmore State High School becoming a Years 7–12 school.

== School logo ==
Kenmore's logo is made up of five items: the Munich Emblem, the castle, the trees, the birds and the book. The Munich Emblem is a reminder of the school's foundation year – the year of the Munich Olympics. The castle links to Kenmore Castle in Scotland; the home of some of the original settlers of Kenmore. The birds and the trees are a symbol of the environmental focus of the school, and the book symbolises learning.

== Sporting houses ==
Kenmore State High School has eight sporting houses, each with a name taken from the Aboriginal language of the district. The sporting houses are:

- Bimbi – meaning "place of many birds"
- Carrawah – meaning "plenty of birds come to rest here"
- Tarcoola – meaning "a river bend"
- Wyuna – meaning "clear water"
- Allunga – meaning "beautiful place"
- Jarrah – meaning "Eucalyptus tree"
- Kinta – meaning "laughter"
- Alkira – meaning "the sky"

== The Information Communication Extension Program ==
The Information Communication Extension (ICE) program at Kenmore is a three-year initiative spanning Years 7–9, with a focus on incorporating technology into students' studies. It is considered the least intensive among Kenmore's extension programs, comprising one semester's worth of extra-curricular content. Students of this program are required to take an additional specialised subject known as 'ICX' (Information Communication Extension) as one of their electives for one semester in Year 9. In this subject, students are tasked with investigating and solving current problems within the local community with the aid of technology.

== The German Immersion Program ==
Kenmore State High School is recognised for its German Immersion Program (GIP), a four-year intensive language initiative. Subjects like math, science, and history are taught in German. The program includes an eight-week exchange in Germany, where students stay with host families and tour the country.

== The Music Extension Program ==
Music Extension (MEX) is a two-year program specifically designed to extend students who have already developed sound music reading and performing skills throughout their primary years of education. The program allows students to develop advanced skills in practical musicianship and theory alongside like-minded peers in a challenging environment.

== The Zenith Program ==
Kenmore State High School offers a program for high performing academic students called The Zenith Program. Students must complete an ACER aptitude test as well as meet other criteria to be considered as an entrant in the program. The Zenith Program enables students to participate in the Future Problem Solving Competition. Past teams of Kenmore State High School have successfully progressed to the next stage of the competition, having competed nationally in Perth and Melbourne.

== Controversies ==
In 2004, video footage of students smoking marijuana has been aired on television, along with claims that some teachers turned a 'blind eye'. Ms Bligh says the school suspended seven students when drugs were discovered.

In 2019, students threatened with detention (or suspension) for wearing incorrect socks became a point of public debate. One student with autism said the mandated branded socks were uncomfortable and caused sensory distress.

In October 2020, Andrew Thomas Blight, the deputy principal of Kenmore State High School, received probation for forging doctors' scripts to obtain powerful painkillers. He pleaded guilty to one count of forgery, uttering and receiving tainted property; the scripts were for MS Contin and fentanyl.

In May 2021, several children from Kenmore High re-enacted the George Floyd incident, sparking controversy as it was reported on many news outlets, such as Nine News.

== Notable alumni ==
- Jacinda Barrett – Hollywood actress
- Lani Belcher – Olympic canoeist
- Paulie Bromley – musician
- Cate and Bronte Campbell – Olympic swimmers
- Simon Cusack – Olympic swimming coach
- Sandra Dawson – middle distance runner
- Julie Eckersley – actress, comedian, writer and producer
- Kerry-Anne Guse – tennis player
- Scott Guyett – former professional soccer player
- Michael Hepburn – cyclist
- Michael Hillardt – Olympic middle distance runner
- Patrick Jhanur – actor
- Joe Klocek – actor
- Justin Leppitsch – former Brisbane Lions AFL player and coach
- Monica Mayhem – pornographic actress
- Erin McNaught – model and actress
- Josh Thomas – comedian and actor
- Reece Tollenaere – former Queensland Roar and Brisbane Strikers soccer player

== See also ==
- List of schools in Queensland
