= Chavar =

City in Ilam province, Iran

Chavar Persian: چوار
- City
- Location within Iran Location within Ilam Province
- Coordinates: 33°41′44″N 46°17′55″E
- Country: Iran
- Province: Ilam
- County: Chavar
- District: Central

Population (2016)
  - Total: 5,831
- Time zone: UTC+3:30 (IRST)

Chavar (Persian: چوار) (Note: Also romanized as Chavār, Chawār, and Chūār; also known as Kani Chavar (كانی چَوار), also romanized as Kānī Chavār and Kānī Chawār) is a city in the Central District (Note: Formerly Chavar District of Ilam County) of Chavar County, Ilam province, Iran, serving as capital of both the county and the district.

== Demographics ==
=== Ethnicity ===
The city is populated by Arkavazi Kurds.

=== Population ===
At the time of the 2006 National Census, the city's population was 5,574 in 1,080 households, when it was in Chavar District (Note: Renamed the Central District of Chavar County) of Ilam County. The following census in 2011 counted 5,775 people in 1,333 households. The 2016 census measured the population of the city as 5,831 people in 1,562 households.

In 2019, the district was separated from the county in the establishment of Chavar County and renamed the Central District, with Chavar as the new county's capital.
