= Chavar County =

County in Ilam province, Iran

Chavar County Persian: شهرستان چوار
- County
- Location of Chavar County in Ilam province (top left, yellow)

- Location of Ilam Province in Iran
- Coordinates: 33°45′N 46°05′E
- Country: Iran
- Province: Ilam
- Capital: Chavar
- Districts: Central, Buli
- Time zone: UTC+3:30 (IRST)

Chavar County (Persian: شهرستان چوار) is in Ilam province, Iran. Its capital is the city of Chavar, whose population at the time of the 2016 National Census was 5,831 people in 1,562 households.

== History ==
In 2019, Chavar District (Note: Renamed the Central District of Chavar County) was separated from Ilam County in the establishment of Chavar County and renamed the Central District. The new county was divided into two districts of two rural districts each, with Chavar as its capital and only city at the time.

== Demographics ==
=== Administrative divisions ===
Chavar County's administrative structure is shown in the following table.

Chavar County
Administrative Divisions
Central District (Note: Formerly Chavar District of Ilam County)
Arkavazi RD
Hajji Bakhtiar RD
Chavar (city)
Buli District
Buli RD
Chakor RD
RD = Rural District

== See also ==
- Eyvan County

Media related to Chavar County at Wikimedia Commons
