= Ipswich State High School =

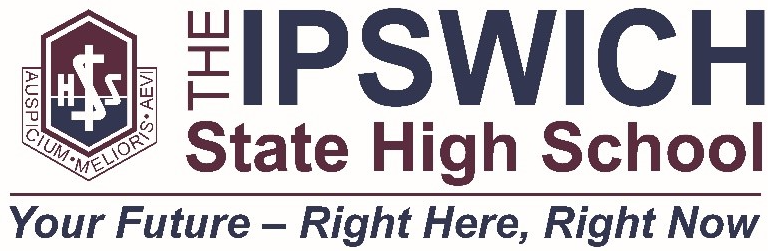
Ipswich State High School Current Logo With Updated Slogan

Location
- 1 Hunter Street; Brassall, Queensland, 4305; Australia; 27.58811°S 152.74714°E

Information
- School type: Public high school
- Motto: Auspicium Melioris Aevi (Hope of a Better Age)
- Established: 1887 (Ipswich CBD); 1963 (1962 as Brassall High school)
- Principal: Kathryn Todd
- Grades: High School (Year 7 to 12)
- Enrollment: Approx 1797
- Average class size: Various
- Houses: Rivers, Sullivan, Moran, O'Hanlon
- Colours: Maroon & navy blue (Formal: white and black/navy blue)
- Slogan: Working Today For A Successful Tomorrow
- Sports: Rugby league, Volleyball, Soccer, Basketball, E.G.
- Website: ipswichshs.eq.edu.au

Ipswich State High School is a state secondary school in the suburb of Brassall, Ipswich, Queensland, Australia, established in 1963 on the site of the original Brassall State High School. Kathryn Todd is the current principal. It is the biggest high school in Ipswich with approximately 1797 students currently attending as of 2024.

== History ==
The Ipswich State High School originally came from a site in the main heart of the Ipswich (suburb), Queensland, inside The Queen Victoria Silver Jubilee Memorial Technical College before moving into the Brassall site in 1963. They were called "Ipswich State High School And Technical College". The School, while transportation, was called Brassall State High School in 1962. The Technical College remained at the original site until it was merched and moved into what is now known today as The Bremer Institute of TAFE. The School in 1962 originally had 4 main buildings, called "A", "B", "C" and "D". Brassall State High School Originally had 8 - 10 staff for the new site, while Ipswich State High School had up to 35 staff in 1963. Brassall State High School introduced a new group of important students called the Student Representative Council, which still functions to this day.

The 1974 Brisbane flood and the 2010–11 Queensland floods impacted records of some years from the school's library and staff rooms.

== Facilities ==
Ipswich State High School's Brassall campus features the following:

- Blocks (buildings) A, B, C, D, E, F, G, H, K, L, M (ongoing renovation) , N, O, Q, R, S, T, X.
- Multiple outdoor facilities all coded "P" - pool, soccer oval, rugby oval/s, sports hall, basketball courts, netball courts, long-jump pit, native garden;
- Trade-training workshop ("T-Block");
- Resource center (official name of school library) (R-Block)

Most buildings on-campus have specialties:

- A-Block is mostly known for sports and recreation.
- B-Block is mostly known for English studies.
- C-Block is mostly known for health and hospitality.
- D-Block is mostly known for English studies.
- E-Block is mostly known for science.
- F-Block is mostly known for hair, nails, and beauty.
- G-Block is mostly known for visual art.
- H-Block is mostly known for Japanese.
- J-Block was a temporary de-mountable building removed around 2023-2024.\
- K-Block is mostly known for special education and student support.
- L-Block is mostly known for mathematics, and the indoor gym located on the lower floor.
- M-Block was mostly demolished (except for a small remaining disconnected computer-lab classroom).
- N-Block (commonly referred to as "N-Pod") is mostly known for science.
- O-Block is the second most recently constructed building and is known for mathematics and IT.
- Q-Block is the most recently constructed building and is known for sciences (biology, chemistry, and physics) upstairs, and industrial design and technology downstairs (including two woodworking workshop classrooms).
- S-Block is mostly known for Asian language learning, though it also contains multiple dance studios.
- T-Block is the school's trade-training center.
- X-Block is the third most recently constructed building and is known for performing arts, drama, and media studies.

== Notable alumni ==
- Robert Lowe Hall, British Government's chief economic advisor
- Allan Langer, NRL football player
- Ronaldo Mulitalo, NRL football player
- Phillip Sami, NRL football player
- Treymain Spry, NRL football player
- Josiah Pahulu, NRL football player
