= Central District (Chavar County) =

District in Ilam province, Iran

Central District (Chavar County) Persian: بخش مرکزی شهرستان چوار
- District
- Location within Iran Location within Ilam Province
- Coordinates: 33°43′37″N 46°14′14″E
- Country: Iran
- Province: Ilam
- County: Chavar
- Capital: Chavar

Population (2016)
  - Total: 10,554 (Note: As Chavar District of Ilam County)
- Time zone: UTC+3:30 (IRST)

The Central District of Chavar County (Persian: بخش مرکزی شهرستان چوار) (Note: Formerly Chavar District (بخش چوار) of Ilam County) is in Ilam province, Iran. Its capital is the city of Chavar.

== History ==
In 2019, Chavar District (Note: Renamed the Central District of Chavar County) was separated from Ilam County in the establishment of Chavar County and renamed the Central District. The new county was divided into two districts of two rural districts each, with Chavar as its capital and only city at the time.

== Demographics ==
=== Population ===
At the time of the 2006 National Census, the district's population (as Chavar District of Ilam County) was 11,860 in 2,378 households. The following census in 2011 counted 11,710 people in 2,692 households. The 2016 census measured the population of the district as 10,554 inhabitants in 2,752 households.

=== Administrative divisions ===
Central District (Chavar County) (Note: As Chavar District of Ilam County at the 2006, 2011, and 2016 censuses)
Administrative Divisions	2006	2011	2016
Arkavazi RD	4,640	4,384	3,702
Buli RD (Note: Transferred to Buli District after the 2016 census)	1,646	1,551	1,021
Hajji Bakhtiar RD			
Chavar (city)	5,574	5,775	5,831
Total	11,860	11,710	10,554
RD = Rural District
