= Haft Cheshmeh =

Haft Cheshmeh or Haftcheshmeh (Persian: هفت چشمه) may refer to:

== Ardabil Province ==
- Haft Cheshmeh, Ardabil, a village in Meshgin Shahr County

== East Azerbaijan Province ==
- Haft Cheshmeh, Azarshahr, a village in Azarshahr County
- Haft Cheshmeh, Meyaneh, a village in Meyaneh County
- Haft Cheshmeh, Shabestar, a village in Shabestar County

== Ilam Province ==
- Haft Cheshmeh, Abdanan
- Haft Cheshmeh, Ilam

== Kermanshah Province ==
- Haft Cheshmeh, Kermanshah, a village in Kermanshah County
- Haft Cheshmeh, Kuzaran, a village in Kermanshah County

== Khuzestan Province ==
- Haft Cheshmeh, Khuzestan, a village in Behbahan County

== Kohgiluyeh and Boyer-Ahmad Province ==
- Haft Cheshmeh, Bahmai, a village in Bahmai County
- Haft Cheshmeh, Kohgiluyeh and Boyer-Ahmad, a village in Boyer-Ahmad County
- Haft Cheshmeh, Gachsaran, a village in Gachsaran County

== Lorestan Province ==
- Haft Cheshmeh, Delfan, a city in Delfan County
- Haft Cheshmeh, Dowreh, a village in Dowreh County
- Haft Cheshmeh, Khorramabad, a village in Khorramabad County
- Haft Cheshmeh, Kuhdasht, a village in Kuhdasht County
- Haft Cheshmeh, Pol-e Dokhtar, a village in Pol-e Dokhtar County
