= Farahabad =

Farahabad or Ferehabad or Farehabad (Persian: فرح اباد) may refer to:

- Farahabad, Hormozgan
- Farahabad, Ilam
- Farahabad, Kashan, Isfahan province
- Farahabad, Zangiabad, Kerman County, Kerman province
- Farahabad, Zarand, Kerman province
- Farahabad (Isfahan)
- Farahabad, Kurdistan
- Farahabad, Lorestan
- Farahabad, Mazandaran
- Farahabad, Amol, Mazandaran province
- Farahabad, Rudpey-ye Shomali, Mazandaran province
- Farahabad, Kashmar, Razavi Khorasan province
- Farahabad, Khvaf, Razavi Khorasan province
- Farahabad, Torqabeh and Shandiz, Razavi Khorasan province
- Farahabad, Semnan
- Farahabad, Tehran
- Farahabad, Khatam, Yazd province
