= Farhadabad =

Farhadabad (Persian: فرهاداباد) may refer to:

- Farhadabad, Fars, Iran
- Farhadabad, Ilam, Iran
- Farhadabad, Khuzestan, Iran
- Farhadabad, Kurdistan, Iran
- Farhadabad, Delfan, Lorestan Province, Iran
- Farhadabad, Selseleh, Lorestan Province, Iran
- Farhadabad Union, Bangladesh
