= Mahmudabad, Ilam =

Village in Ilam province, Iran

Mahmudabad Persian: محموداباد
- Village
- Location within Iran Location within Ilam Province
- Coordinates: 33°30′26″N 46°32′36″E
- Country: Iran
- Province: Ilam
- County: Ilam
- District: Sivan
- Rural District: Mahmudabad

Population (2016)
  - Total: 789
- Time zone: UTC+3:30 (IRST)

Mahmudabad (Persian: محموداباد) (Note: Also romanized as Maḩmūdābād; also known as Maḩmūdābād-e Mīsh Khāş) is a village in, and the capital of, Mahmudabad Rural District of Sivan District, Ilam County, Ilam province, Iran.

== Demographics ==
=== Ethnicity ===
The village is populated by Kurds.

=== Population ===
At the time of the 2006 National Census, the village's population was 854 in 171 households, when it was in Mishkhas Rural District of the Central District. The following census in 2011 counted 887 people in 225 households. The 2016 census measured the population of the village as 789 people in 217 households, by which time the rural district had been separated from the district in the formation of Sivan District.

In 2023, Mahmudabad was transferred to Mahmudabad Rural District created in the district.
