= List of festivals in Iran =

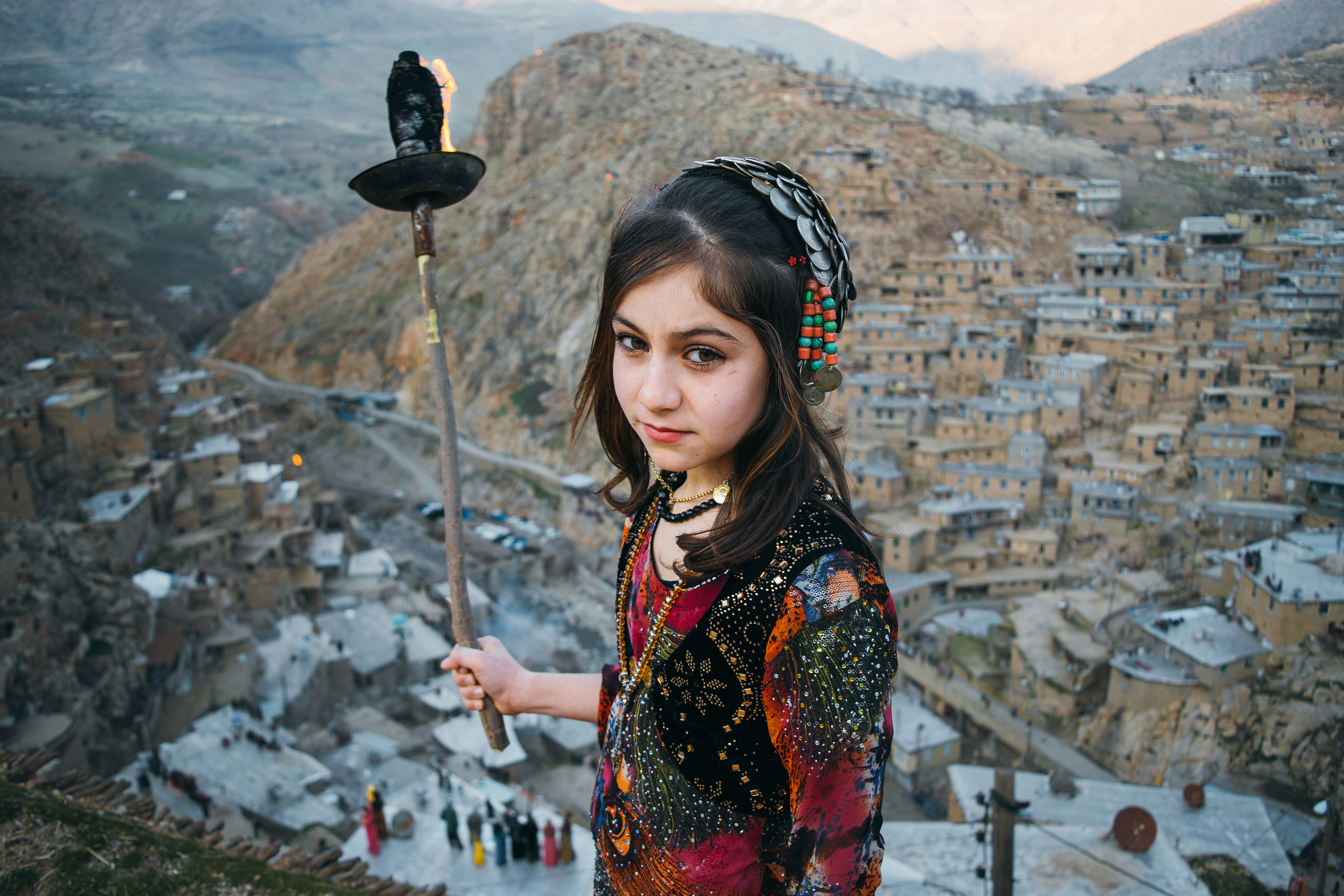
A Kurdish girl in Iran prepares for Nowruz.

The following list is a list of festivals in Iran.

== Iranian cultural festivals ==
- Nowruz: The word of "Norouz" includes two parts; "no" that means "new" and "ruz OR rouz" which means "day", so "Nowruz" means starting a new day and it is the Celebration of the start of spring (Rejuvenation). It starts on the first day of spring (also the first day of the Iranian Calendar year), 21 March, in that 12 days as a sign of the past 12 months, all Iranian families gather around to visit each other.

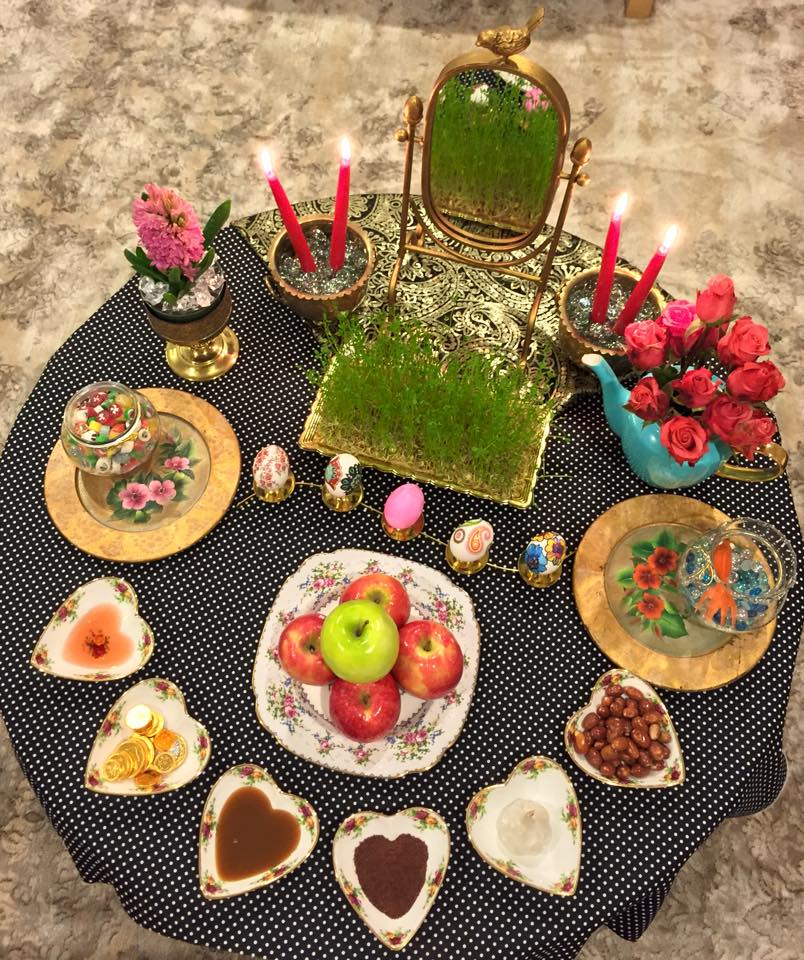
Haft Seen traditional table of Norouz

- Sofre-ye Haft-Sin: sofre (tablecloth), haft (seven), sin (the letter S [س]). Al-Bīrūnī said: Haft-sin came from Jamshid since he destroyed the evil that made Persian lands weak, so on the first day of Iranian calendar people celebrated Norouz and they put 7 different symbolic items on their table as a sign of thanking nature for giving humans all they need. Since then every year Iranians put Haft-sin on their tables, but nowadays they put 7 things that start with letter "S (س)".
- Sizdah Bedar: Persian Festival of "Joy and Solidarity". The 13th and last day of Norouz celebration. Because of the end of twelve days (a sample of twelve month) they celebrate the 13th day as a new beginning of the next twelve month and it has no relations with the number 13 (as an unlucky number).
- Mehregan: Festival of Mehr (or Mithra). A day of thanksgiving. It is a day which everyone shows the mehr or the love they have for each other and it is one of the most important days in the year.
- Jashn-e Sade: A mid-winter feast to honor fire and to "defeat the forces of darkness, frost and cold" in which people gather around and build a fire so that they can assist the revival of the sun to bring back warmth and summer.
- Shab-e Yalda: Also known as The turning point. End of the longest night of the year, and beginning of growing of the days.
- Sepandarmazgan: Day of Love, Friendship and Earth in ancient Persian culture.
- Chaharshanbe Suri: Festival of Fire, last Wednesday night in the Iranian Calendar year..
- Shast-Sheshi festival (or related to "sixty-six" in Persian) is held annually near Isfahan. Beginning on the sixty-sixth day after Nowruz, the festival corresponds in date and function to the ancient feast of Khordadgan, dedicated to the divinity Khordad, the female guardian of water.

== Religious festivals ==
=== Zoroastrianism ===
The basis of nearly all of Iranian national festivals are from its Pre-Islamic Zoroastrian era. However, there are some festivals that are celebrated exclusively by Zoroastrians and some with less extent in other communities too.

- Khordadgân: Celebration of the 6th day of Iranian calendar. Khordad is one of the Izadans name which means completeness. In this day people used to go near the river or a sea to thank God for everything and they gave each other flowers as a sign of happiness. A rare surviving form of Khordadgan is celebrated as the Shast-Sheshi festival annually in the village of Sian in Isfahan Province.
- Bahmanagân: Also maintained by Iranian Muslims until the Mongol invasion. The festival was celebrated on the second day of the month of Bahman, under the name Bahmanjana. Apparently, Bahmanjana is a modified form of the original Bahmanagân.
- Sepandarmazgân Bahmanagân: Esfandegān or Spandegān is the day of love.
- Farvardingân: Festival of the Forouhar.
- Jašne Sade: Festival of Fire. Lit. the 100th day (before Nowruz).
- Jašne Mehregân: Festival of Mihr (or Mehr). A day of thanksgiving dedicated to the highest Angel, Mithra.
- Jašne Tiregân: Festival of Tir. A day dedicated to Tishtrya, Angel of the star Sirius and rain. Also celebrated in some Muslim regions in Iran including Mazandaran.
- Nowruz: New Year's Day. March (first day of Spring).
- Khordad Sal: Birthday of the Prophet Zarathushtra.
- Zartosht No-Diso: Anniversary commemorating the death of the Prophet Zarathushtra.
- Azargân: The day of fire commonly held by Zoroastrians in their Fire Temples.
- Abanegân: A celebration for the goddess Naheed (Anahita).
- Amordadegân: without Death

=== Islamic ===
- Eid-e Fetr: "The Festival of Fast-Breaking" which comes at the end of Ramadan. People give gifts and money to the poor, the sick and others.
  - Ramadan (Ramazan in Persian): Iranians have special recipes as Zoolbia-Bamieh, Shole Zard, Ferni, Halva and Ash Reshteh in Ramezan.
- Nimeh Şaabân: celebration for the twelfth and final Shi'a Imam. The festival consists of some fireworks and decorating the cities with lights, bulbs and trees.
- Shab-e Qadr: the "Night of Qadr" towards the end of Ramadan, which is when the first verses of the Qur'an were revealed to Muhammad. Iranians stay awake during the nights and some light candles and listen to Dua while reciting the Qur'an.
- Eid-e Qurban: "The Festival of Sacrifice". In Iran, some wealthy people and farmers sacrifice their herds and offer the meat to neighbors and the poor as charity.
- Eid-e Ghadir Khumm: is a Shia feast, and is considered to be among the "significant" feasts of Shia Islam. The Eid is held on 18 Dhu Al-Hijjah at the time when the Islamic prophet Muhammad (following instruction from Allah) was said to have appointed Ali ibn Abi Talib as his successor.
- Shiite and Sunni unity week for the birth of the Prophet of Islam: 12-17 Rabiʽ al-Awwal
- Birth of Hasan ibn Ali: 15 Ramadan
- Birth of Husayn ibn Ali: 3 Sha'ban
- Birth of Ali ibn Husayn Zayn al-Abidin: 5 Sha'ban
- Birth of Ali al-Akbar ibn Husayn (Young Day): 11 Sha'ban
- Birth of Ali ibn Abi Talib: 13 Rajab
- Fatimah bint Musa birthday (Girl's Day): 1 taste
- Birth of Ali al-Ridha: 11 Dhu al-Qadah
- Eid al-Fitr of the Prophet of Islam: 27 Rajab
- Celebrating the beginning of the Imamate of Muhammad al-Mahdi: 9th of Rabiʽ al-Awwal
- Marriage celebration of Ali ibn Abi Talib and Fatimah: 1 Dhu al-Hijjah

=== Christian ===
The majority of Iranian Christians are Armenian-Iranians also known as Parska-Hye who follow the Armenian Apostolic Church, an Oriental Orthodox branch of Christianity. This minority has their very own special festivals and traditions.

There is also a significant minority of Assyrian people who follow the Oriental Orthodox Christian Assyrian Church of the East and the Chaldean Catholic Church, these two church groups also have a minority of Persian followers. The followers of this church have a blend of Persian and Assyrian culture.

Iran has a large and fast growing Christian community gaining popularity amongst Persians. During Christmas times, Christmas trees can be seen from windows in Tehran and north-western provinces. Although Christmas has an official recognition in Iran, it is not a national holiday.

=== Jewish ===
Iranian Jews celebrate all the same holidays as Jews worldwide, but often maintain unique customs in the observance of those holidays. Some more uniquely Iranian traditions include:

- Purim is particularly special among Jews in Iran because it recounts the story of a Jewish queen married to a Persian king in Susa, Iran and the central figures of the story Mordechai and Esther are customarily believed to be buried in Hamedan
- Illanout (tree festival) Celebrated in February, it is nearly identical to Shab-e Cheleh and is a lot more elaborate, reminiscence of the pre-Islamic celebrations
- Shab-e Sal, lit. Night of the Year: The night of the end of Passover, when chametz can once again be eaten. It is usually celebrated with many types of breads and dairy items. This festival is unique to Persian Jews due to the holiday’s proximity to Nowruz and is not celebrated in this way by most other Jews. The day after Passover is similarly known as Rooz-e Sal, which would often involve outdoor picnics similar to Sizdah Be-dar
- Similar to Shab-e Sal, Lel Resh Shata (Lishan Didan: Night of the New Year) or simply Lel Shata (Lishan Didan: Night of the Year) is celebrated by Nash Didan Jews from Iranian Azerbaijan. Many customs and practices are identical to Shab-e Sal, but there are some distinct practices. Customs include: placing a mirror on the table to reflect happiness into the new year, placing grain and coins/jewelry into a bowl of water (to recall the events of the Splitting of the Sea and the New Year for the Grain), sending gifts to each other, and eating hames and dairy (as they couldn't be eaten on Pesah, hames due to Biblical prohibition, and dairy since many Nash Didan Jews are stricter on the practice of Halaw Yisrael on Pesah than the rest of the year). The holiday is often connected to the waving of the 'omer, and some miswot like miswat qali (as mentioned in Mishna Menahot 10) may be performed then.

== Film festivals ==
- Cinéma Vérité documentary film festival, Tehran
- Fajr International Film Festival, the major film festival
- Hassanat short film festival, Esfahan
- International Film Festival for Children and Youth, held in different cities each year
- Nahal International Short Film Festival, a student festival dedicated to short films
- Roshd International Film Festival, focused on films with educational themes
- Tehran International Film Festival, a former film festival, held before the Iranian revolution (1972-1977)
- Tehran International Short Film Festival, from 2020 a qualifying festival for the Academy Awards
- Urban International Film Festival, held in Tehran by the Tasvir Shahr Institute

== Bibliography ==
- Shirzad Aghaee, Nouruz - Berliyan-negin-e jashnha-yi irani va digar jashnha va jashn-aiyinha-yi mardomi-yi iran (Nouruz and other Iranian National Festivals), Stockholm, Sweden, 2002.
- Festivals in Encyclopædia Iranica
