= Jarqavieh =

Jarqavieh (Persian: جرقویه) may refer to:

- Jarqavieh County, an administrative division of Isfahan province, Iran
- Jarqavieh Olya (disambiguation)
- Jarqavieh Sofla (disambiguation)
- Jarqavieh Vosta Rural District, an administrative division of Jarqavieh County, Iran
