= Meydan, Ilam =

Village in Ilam province, Iran

Meydan Persian: ميدان
- Village
- Location within Iran Location within Ilam Province
- Coordinates: 33°30′56″N 46°33′51″E
- Country: Iran
- Province: Ilam
- County: Ilam
- District: Sivan
- Rural District: Mish Khas

Population (2016)
  - Total: 1,046
- Time zone: UTC+3:30 (IRST)

Meydan (Persian: ميدان) (Note: Also romanized as Meydān; also known as Meydān-e Mīsh Khāş) is a village in, and the capital of, Mish Khas Rural District of Sivan District, Ilam County, Ilam province, Iran. The previous capital of the rural district was the village of Jafarabad, now a city.

== Demographics ==
=== Ethnicity ===
The village is populated by Kurds.

=== Population ===
At the time of the 2006 National Census, the village's population was 869 in 172 households, when it was in the Central District. The following census in 2011 counted 848 people in 202 households. The 2016 census measured the population of the village as 1,046 people in 312 households, by which time the rural district had been separated from the district in the formation of Sivan District.
