= Darvand, Ilam =

Darvand داروند
- Village
- Location within Iran
- Coordinates: 33°31′27″N 46°34′00″E
- Country: Iran
- Province: Ilam
- County: Ilam
- Bakhsh: Sivan
- Rural District: Mishkhas

Population (2006)
  - Total: 364
- Time zone: UTC+3:30 (IRST)
  - Summer (DST): UTC+4:30 (IRDT)

Darvand (Persian: داروند, also Romanized as Dārvand; also known as Dārvand-e Mīsh Khāş) is a village in Mishkhas Rural District, in the Sivan District of Ilam County, Ilam Province, Iran. At the 2006 census, its population was 364, in 67 families. The village is populated by Kurds.
