= Hoseynabad, Ilam =

Hoseynabad حسين اباد
- Village
- Location within Iran
- Coordinates: 33°30′36″N 46°33′59″E
- Country: Iran
- Province: Ilam
- County: Ilam
- Bakhsh: Sivan
- Rural District: Mishkhas

Population (2006)
  - Total: 618
- Time zone: UTC+3:30 (IRST)
  - Summer (DST): UTC+4:30 (IRDT)

Hoseynabad (Persian: حسين اباد, also Romanized as Ḩoseynābād; also known as Ḩoseynābād-e Mīsh Khāş) is a village in Mishkhas Rural District, in the Sivan District of Ilam County, Ilam Province, Iran. At the 2006 census, its population was 618, in 134 families. The village is populated by Kurds.
