= Heydarabad, Ilam =

Heydarabad حيدراباد
- Village
- Location within Iran
- Coordinates: 33°31′46″N 46°34′24″E
- Country: Iran
- Province: Ilam
- County: Ilam
- Bakhsh: Sivan
- Rural District: Mishkhas

Population (2006)
  - Total: 691
- Time zone: UTC+3:30 (IRST)
  - Summer (DST): UTC+4:30 (IRDT)

Heydarabad (Persian: حيدراباد, also Romanized as Ḩeydarābād; also known as Ḩeydarābād-e Mīsh Khāş) is a village in Mishkhas Rural District, in the Sivan District of Ilam County, Ilam province, Iran. At the 2006 census, its population was 691, in 130 families. The village is populated by Kurds.
