= Shahrak-e Shahid Keshvari =

Village in Ilam province, Iran

Shahrak-e Shahid Keshvari Persian: شهرک شهید کشوری
- Village
- Location within Iran Location within Ilam Province
- Coordinates: 33°35′19″N 46°22′41″E
- Country: Iran
- Province: Ilam
- County: Ilam
- District: Central
- Rural District: Keshvari

Population (2016)
  - Total: 5,092
- Time zone: UTC+3:30 (IRST)

Shahrak-e Shahid Keshvari (Persian: شهرک شهید کشوری) (Note: Also romanized as Shahrak-e Shahid Kashvari and Shahrak-e Shahīd Kashvarī) is a village in, and the capital of, Keshvari Rural District of the Central District of Ilam County, Ilam province, Iran.

== Demographics ==
=== Ethnicity ===
The village is populated by Kurds.

=== Population ===
At the time of the 2006 National Census, the village's population was 3,749 in 819 households, when it was in Deh Pain Rural District. The following census in 2011 counted 4,895 people in 1,244 households. The 2016 census measured the population of the village as 5,092 people in 1,440 households, by which time it had been transferred to Keshvari Rural District created in the district. It was the most populous village in its rural district.
