= Sarbisheh, Ilam =

Sarbisheh سربيشه
- Village
- Location within Iran
- Coordinates: 33°32′07″N 46°31′05″E
- Country: Iran
- Province: Ilam
- County: Ilam
- Bakhsh: Sivan
- Rural District: Mishkhas

Population (2006)
  - Total: 91
- Time zone: UTC+3:30 (IRST)
  - Summer (DST): UTC+4:30 (IRDT)

Sarbisheh (Persian: سربيشه, also Romanized as Sarbīsheh) is a village in Mishkhas Rural District, in the Sivan District of Ilam County, Ilam Province, Iran. At the 2006 census, its population was 91, in 23 families. The village is populated by Kurds.
