= Kolah Kabud, Ilam =

Kolah Kabud كله كبود
- Village
- Location within Iran
- Coordinates: 33°30′54″N 46°31′41″E
- Country: Iran
- Province: Ilam
- County: Ilam
- Bakhsh: Sivan
- Rural District: Mishkhas

Population (2006)
  - Total: 359
- Time zone: UTC+3:30 (IRST)
  - Summer (DST): UTC+4:30 (IRDT)

Kolah Kabud (Persian: كله كبود, also Romanized as Kolah Kabūd; also known as Gol Kabūd-e Mīsh Khāş) is a village in Mishkhas Rural District, in the Sivan District of Ilam County, Ilam Province, Iran. At the 2006 census, its population was 359, in 70 families. The village is populated by Kurds.
