= Saadatabad, Jarqavieh =

Village in Isfahan province, Iran

Saadatabad Persian: سعادت اباد
- Village
- Location within Iran
- Coordinates: 32°16′26″N 52°08′54″E
- Country: Iran
- Province: Isfahan
- County: Jarqavieh
- District: Central
- Rural District: Jarqavieh Vosta

Population (2016)
  - Total: 416
- Time zone: UTC+3:30 (IRST)

Saadatabad (Persian: سعادت اباد) (Note: Also romanized as Sa‘ādatābād) is a village in Jarqavieh Vosta Rural District of the Central District (Note: Formerly Jarqavieh District and then Jarqavieh Sofla District of Isfahan County) in Jarqavieh County, Isfahan province, Iran.

== Demographics ==
=== Population ===
At the time of the 2006 National Census, the village's population was 478 in 128 households, when it was in Jarqavieh Sofla District (Note: Renamed the Central District of Jarqavieh County) of Isfahan County. The following census in 2011 counted 421 people in 127 households. The 2016 census measured the population of the village as 416 people in 139 households.

In 2021, the district was separated from the county in the establishment of Jarqavieh County and renamed the Central District.
