= Ganjabad, Isfahan =

Village in Isfahan province, Iran

Ganjabad Persian: گنج اباد
- Village
- Location within Iran
- Coordinates: 32°22′40″N 52°07′14″E
- Country: Iran
- Province: Isfahan
- County: Jarqavieh
- District: Central
- Rural District: Jarqavieh Sofla

Population (2016)
  - Total: 166
- Time zone: UTC+3:30 (IRST)

Ganjabad (Persian: گنج اباد) (Note: Also romanized as Ganjābād; also known as Ganjehābād) is a village in Jarqavieh Sofla Rural District of the Central District (Note: Formerly Jarqavieh District and then Jarqavieh Sofla District of Isfahan County) in Jarqavieh County, Isfahan province, Iran.

== Demographics ==
=== Population ===
At the time of the 2006 National Census, the village's population was 119 in 39 households, when it was in Jarqavieh Sofla District (Note: Renamed the Central District of Jarqavieh County) of Isfahan County. The following census in 2011 counted 220 people in 55 households. The 2016 census measured the population of the village as 166 people in 54 households.

In 2021, the district was separated from the county in the establishment of Jarqavieh County and renamed the Central District.
