= Haft Cheshmeh, Ilam =

Haft Cheshmeh هفتچشمه
- Village
- Location within Iran
- Coordinates: 33°37′38″N 46°21′33″E
- Country: Iran
- Province: Ilam
- County: Ilam
- Bakhsh: Central
- Rural District: Deh Pain

Population (2006)
  - Total: 3,497
- Time zone: UTC+3:30 (IRST)
  - Summer (DST): UTC+4:30 (IRDT)

Haft Cheshmeh (Persian: هفتچشمه) is a village in Deh Pain Rural District, in the Central District of Ilam County, Ilam Province, Iran. At the 2006 census, its population was 3,497, in 700 families. The village is populated by Kurds.
