= Fathollah Amiri =

Iranian Filmmaker

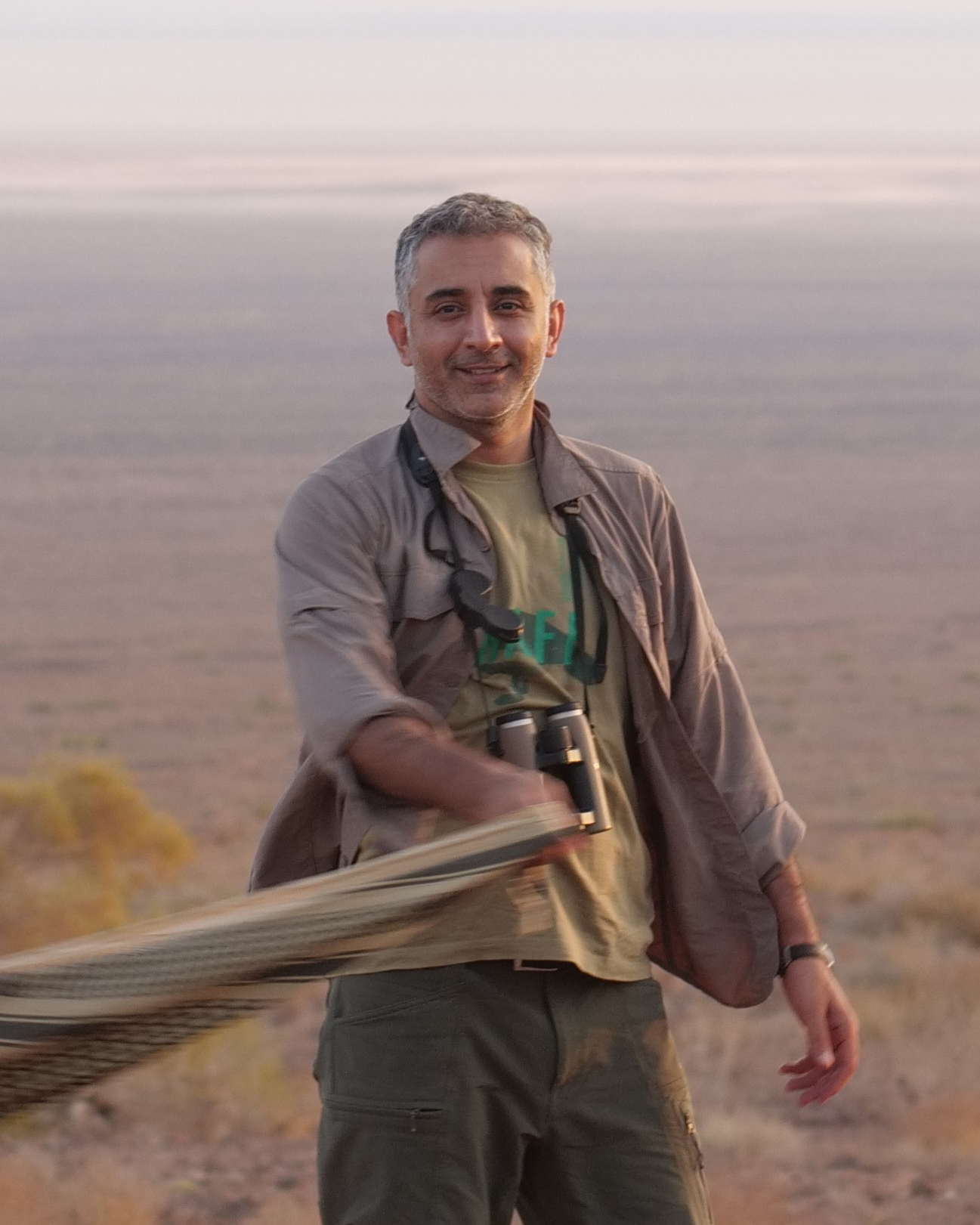
Fathollah Amiri at Kavir National Park

Fathollah Amiri (Persian: فتح الله امیری, born 1981) is an Iranian documentary filmmaker with a career focusing on the environment and wildlife of Iran. His film, Ranger and Leopard, received the Green Screen award in Germany in 2018. His film Vortex won the 33rd edition of the Sondrio Festival in Italy in 2019. He has also served as a judge at the Matsalu Nature Film Festival in Estonia in 2019 and the Sondrio Festival of Environmental Films in Italy in 2020. In Iran, Amiri has won notable awards, including two Fajr International Film Festival awards for In Search of the Persian Leopard (2012) and Life in Eclipse (2010), as well as the Grand Prize of the Cinema Verite Festival for Alamto, A reptile wonderland (2014).

== Early life and education ==
Fathollah Amiri was born in 1981 in Ilam, Iran. He developed a passion for environmental and wildlife issues early in life, which later influenced his career choice. Amiri pursued higher education in film studies and holds a master's degree in Documentary Production from IRIB University.

== Career ==
Amiri's career as a documentary filmmaker began in the early 2000s. He has directed and produced numerous documentaries that shed light on the environmental challenges and unique wildlife of Iran.

== Awards and Recognitions ==
Year	Festival / Organization	Location	Award / Selection	Work
2009	National Student Film Festival	Tehran, Iran	Best Documentary	Life in Eclipse
2011	Fajr International Film Festival	Tehran, Iran	Crystal Simorgh for Best Feature Documentary	In Search for the Persian Leopard
2012	Jahorina International Film Festival	Bosnia and Herzegovina	Silver Genian Prize for Best Environmental Documentary	In Search for the Persian Leopard
2012	Cinema Verite International Documentary Film Festival	Tehran, Iran	Best Environmental Documentary Feature	In Search for the Persian Leopard
2013	Jam-e Jam TV Festival	Tehran, Iran	Sarv Award for Best Documentary Series	Reptiles of Iran
2014	Cinema Verite Festival	Tehran, Iran	Grand Prize for Best Film	Alamto: A Reptile Wonderland
2014	Iranian House of Cinema	Tehran, Iran	Best Researcher, Best Photography, Best Music	Alamto: A Reptile Wonderland
2014	Roshd International Film Festival	Tehran, Iran	Best Documentary & Department of Environment Prize	Alamto: A Reptile Wonderland
2015	ABU Film Awards	Istanbul, Turkey	Best Feature Documentary	Alamto: A Reptile Wonderland
2015	Japan Prize (NHK)	Tokyo, Japan	Official Selection	Alamto: A Reptile Wonderland
2015	Wildlife Conservation Film Festival	New York, USA	Finalist – Best Foreign Feature	In Search for the Persian Leopard
2017	Jackson Wild (formerly Jackson Hole)	Wyoming, USA	Best Film Award – People & Nature	Ranger and Leopard
2018	Jam-e Jam TV Festival	Tehran, Iran	Sarv Award for Best Documentary Director	Ranger and Leopard
2018	Matsalu Nature Film Festival	Estonia	1st Prize, Best Director	Ranger and Leopard
2018	Green Screen International Nature Film Festival	Germany	Best Independent Film	Ranger and Leopard
2018	Wildscreen Panda Awards	United Kingdom	Emerging Talent Nominee	In the Realm of the Spider-tailed Viper
2019	Gran Paradiso Film Festival	Italy	WWF Italy Award	In the Realm of the Spider-tailed Viper
2019	Sondrio Festival	Italy	Città di Sondrio Award	Vortex
2019	CMS Vatavaran Film Festival	India	Special Jury Mention	Vortex
2021	Festival de Ménigoute	Ménigoute, France	Nature Protection Award	Vortex

== Filmography ==
Part of Alamto A Reptile Wonderland from Fathollah Amiri

- In Search of the Iranian Leopard (2011)
- Alamto A Reptile Wonderland (2014)
- Reptiles of Iran (2013)
- The Ranger and the Leopard (2018)
- Life in Eclipse (2009)
- In the Realm of the Spider-Tailed Viper (2018)
- In the Whirlpool of Extinction (2017)
- Houbara (2018)
