= Tut Castle =

Castle in Ilam Province, Iran

Tut castle
- قلعه توت

General information
- Type: Castle
- Location: Ilam, Iran

Tut castle (Persian: قلعه توت) is a historical castle located in Ilam County in Ilam Province.
