= Esfandaran =

Village in Isfahan province, Iran

Esfandaran Persian: اسفنداران
- Village
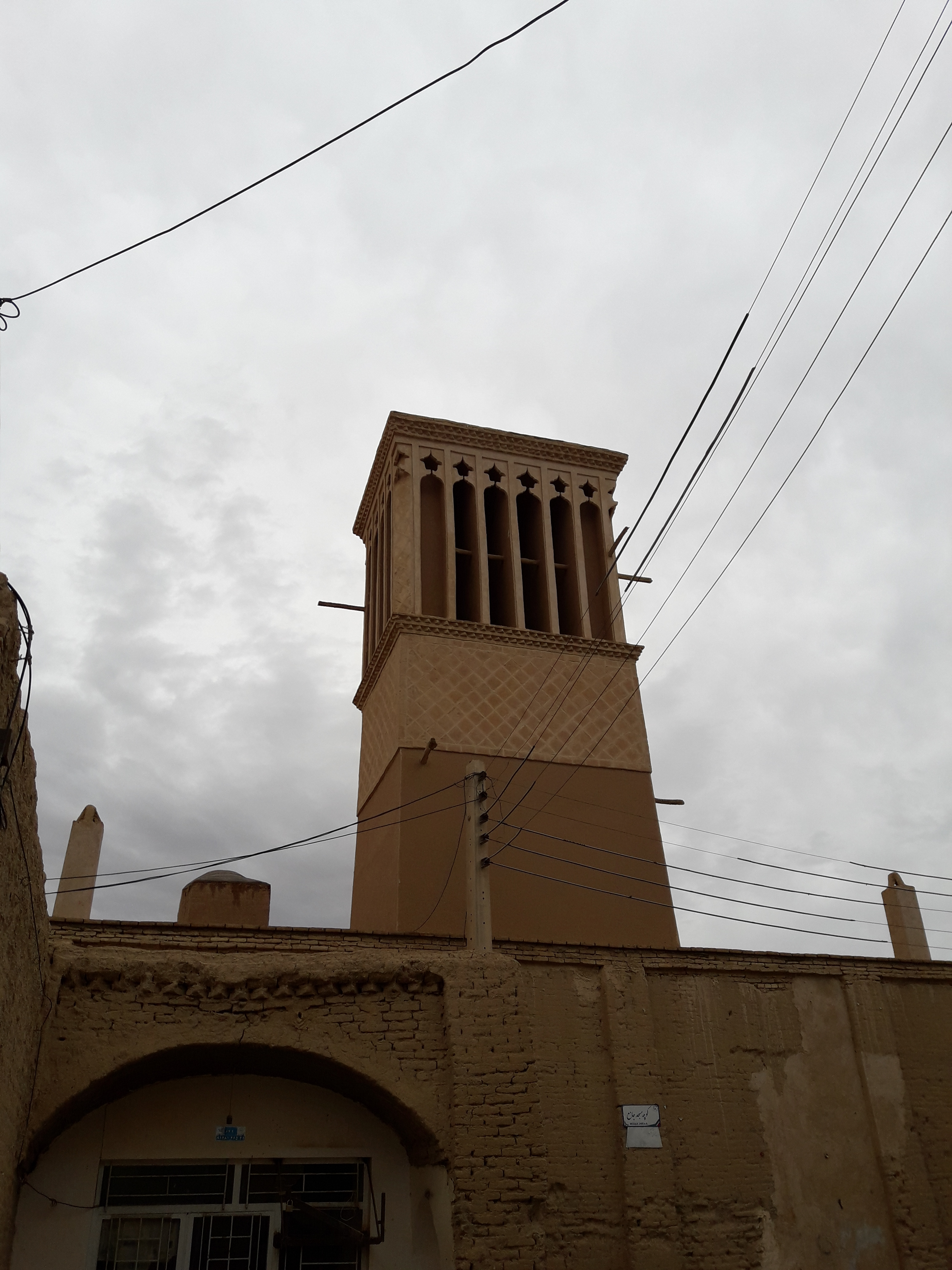
- Tower in the village of Esfandaran

- Location within Iran
- Coordinates: 31°49′23″N 52°36′38″E
- Country: Iran
- Province: Isfahan
- County: Jarqavieh
- District: Jarqavieh Olya
- Rural District: Ramsheh

Population (2016)
  - Total: 872
- Time zone: UTC+3:30 (IRST)

Esfandaran (Persian: اسفنداران) (Note: Also romanized as Esfandārān; also known as Esfandān and Isfandūn) is a village in Ramsheh Rural District of Jarqavieh Olya District (Note: Formerly Sepiddasht District of Isfahan County) in Jarqavieh County, Isfahan province, Iran.

== Demographics ==
=== Population ===
At the time of the 2006 National Census, the village's population was 1,005 in 300 households, when it was in Isfahan County. The following census in 2011 counted 927 people in 306 households. The 2016 census measured the population of the village as 872 people in 289 households.

In 2021, the district was separated from the county in the establishment of Jarqavieh County.
