= Peykan, Iran =

Village in Isfahan province, Iran

Peykan Persian: پيكان
- Village
- Location within Iran
- Coordinates: 32°15′27″N 52°10′30″E
- Country: Iran
- Province: Isfahan
- County: Jarqavieh
- District: Central
- Rural District: Jarqavieh Vosta

Population (2016)
  - Total: 2,760
- Time zone: UTC+3:30 (IRST)

Peykan (Persian: پيكان) (Note: Also romanized as Pāikān, Pāyekān, and Peykān) is a village in Jarqavieh Vosta Rural District of the Central District (Note: Formerly Jarqavieh District and then Jarqavieh Sofla District of Isfahan County) in Jarqavieh County, Isfahan province, Iran.

== Demographics ==
=== Population ===
At the time of the 2006 National Census, the village's population was 2,583 in 718 households, when it was in Jarqavieh Sofla District (Note: Renamed the Central District of Jarqavieh County) of Isfahan County. The following census in 2011 counted 2,865 people in 903 households. The 2016 census measured the population of the village as 2,760 people in 937 households, the most populous in its rural district.

In 2021, the district was separated from the county in the establishment of Jarqavieh County and renamed the Central District.

== See also ==
- Nikabad
