= Mahmudabad Rural District (Ilam County) =

Rural district in Ilam province, Iran

Mahmudabad Rural District Persian: دهستان محمودآباد
- Rural District
- Location within Iran Location within Ilam Province
- Coordinates: 33°30′26″N 46°32′36″E
- Country: Iran
- Province: Ilam
- County: Ilam
- District: Sivan
- Capital: Mahmudabad
- Time zone: UTC+3:30 (IRST)

Mahmudabad Rural District (Persian: دهستان محمودآباد) is in Sivan District of Ilam County, Ilam province, Iran. Its capital is the village of Mahmudabad, whose population at the time of the 2016 National Census was 789 in 217 households.

== History ==
After the 2011 census, Mishkhas Rural District was separated from the Central District in the formation of Sivan District. Mahmudabad Rural District was created in the district in 2023.
