= Feyzabad, Jarqavieh Olya =

Village in Isfahan province, Iran

Feyzabad Persian: فيض اباد
- Village
- Location within Iran
- Coordinates: 31°50′30″N 52°36′29″E
- Country: Iran
- Province: Isfahan
- County: Jarqavieh
- District: Jarqavieh Olya
- Rural District: Ramsheh

Population (2016)
  - Total: 56
- Time zone: UTC+3:30 (IRST)

Feyzabad (Persian: فيض اباد) (Note: Also romanized as Feyẕābād; also known as Faiz Abadé Jarghooyeh and Faizābād) is a village in Ramsheh Rural District of Jarqavieh Olya District (Note: Formerly Sepiddasht District of Isfahan County) in Jarqavieh County, Isfahan province, Iran.

== Demographics ==
=== Population ===
At the time of the 2006 National Census, the village's population was 76 in 30 households, when it was in Isfahan County. The following census in 2011 counted 70 people in 28 households. The 2016 census measured the population of the village as 56 people in 27 households.

In 2021, the district was separated from the county in the establishment of Jarqavieh County.
