= Asadabad, Isfahan =

Village in Isfahan province, Iran

Asadabad Persian: اسداباد
- Village
- Location within Iran
- Coordinates: 31°45′20″N 52°10′15″E
- Country: Iran
- Province: Isfahan
- County: Jarqavieh
- District: Jarqavieh Olya
- Rural District: Ramsheh

Population (2016)
  - Total: 60
- Time zone: UTC+3:30 (IRST)

Asadabad (Persian: اسداباد) (Note: Also romanized as Asadābād; also known as Asadābād-e Zand) is a village in Ramsheh Rural District of Jarqavieh Olya District (Note: Formerly Sepiddasht District of Isfahan County) in Jarqavieh County, Isfahan province, Iran.

== Demographics ==
=== Population ===
At the time of the 2006 National Census, the village's population was 52 in 12 households, when it was in Isfahan County. The following census in 2011 counted 34 people in nine households. The 2016 census measured the population of the village as 60 people in 21 households.

In 2021, the district was separated from the county in the establishment of Jarqavieh County.
