= Dastjerd, Isfahan =

Village in Isfahan province, Iran

Dastjerd Persian: دستجرد
- Village
- Location within Iran
- Coordinates: 32°10′08″N 52°37′47″E
- Country: Iran
- Province: Isfahan
- County: Jarqavieh
- District: Jarqavieh Olya
- Rural District: Jarqavieh Olya

Population (2016)
  - Total: 1,672
- Time zone: UTC+3:30 (IRST)

Dastjerd (Persian: دستجرد) (Note: Also known as Dashtgerd, Dashtgird, Dastgerd, Dastgird, and Dastjerdé Jarghooyeh) is a village in Jarqavieh Olya Rural District of Jarqavieh Olya District (Note: Formerly Sepiddasht District of Isfahan County) in Jarqavieh County, Isfahan province, Iran.

== Demographics ==
=== Population ===
At the time of the 2006 National Census, the village's population was 1,610 in 477 households, when it was in Isfahan County. The following census in 2011 counted 1,658 people in 570 households. The 2016 census measured the population of the village as 1,672 people in 590 households.

In 2021, the district was separated from the county in the establishment of Jarqavieh County.
