= Ramsheh =

Village in Isfahan province, Iran

Ramsheh Persian: رامشه
- Village
- Location within Iran
- Coordinates: 31°49′23″N 52°29′45″E
- Country: Iran
- Province: Isfahan
- County: Jarqavieh
- District: Jarqavieh Olya
- Rural District: Ramsheh

Population (2016)
  - Total: 3,131
- Time zone: UTC+3:30 (IRST)

Ramsheh (Persian: رامشه) (Note: Also romanized as Rāmshah and Rāmsheh; also known as Rūm Shāh) is a village in, and the capital of, Ramsheh Rural District in Jarqavieh Olya District (Note: Formerly Sepiddasht District of Isfahan County) of Jarqavieh County, Isfahan province, Iran.

== Demographics ==
=== Population ===
At the time of the 2006 National Census, the village's population was 2,579 in 770 households, when it was in Isfahan County. The following census in 2011 counted 2,676 people in 854 households. The 2016 census measured the population of the village as 3,131 people in 1,030 households, the most populous in its rural district.

In 2021, the district was separated from the county in the establishment of Jarqavieh County.
