= Ahmadabad, Isfahan =

Village in Isfahan province, Iran

Ahmadabad Persian: احمداباد
- Village
- Location within Iran
- Coordinates: 31°49′59″N 52°35′39″E
- Country: Iran
- Province: Isfahan
- County: Jarqavieh
- District: Jarqavieh Olya
- Rural District: Ramsheh

Population (2016)
  - Total: 254
- Time zone: UTC+3:30 (IRST)

Ahmadabad (Persian: احمداباد) (Note: Also romanized as Aḩmadābād; also known as Ahmad Abadé Jarghooye, Aḩmadābād-e Jorqūyaeh, and Ḩoseynābād) is a village in Ramsheh Rural District of Jarqavieh Olya District (Note: Formerly Sepiddasht District of Isfahan County) in Jarqavieh County, Isfahan province, Iran. A new mosque has been built on the eastern side of the village.

== Demographics ==
=== Population ===
At the time of the 2006 National Census, the village's population was 304 in 105 households, when it was in Isfahan County. The following census in 2011 counted 251 people in 106 households. The 2016 census measured the population of the village as 254 people in 119 households.

In 2021, the district was separated from the county in the establishment of Jarqavieh County.
