= Khara, Iran =

Village in Isfahan province, Iran

Khara Persian: خارا
- Village
- Location within Iran
- Coordinates: 32°07′26″N 52°38′05″E
- Country: Iran
- Province: Isfahan
- County: Jarqavieh
- District: Jarqavieh Olya
- Rural District: Jarqavieh Olya

Population (2016)
  - Total: 724
- Time zone: UTC+3:30 (IRST)

Khara (Persian: خارا) (Note: Also romanized as Khārā; also known as Kharaw and Khareh) is a village in Jarqavieh Olya Rural District of Jarqavieh Olya District (Note: Formerly Sepiddasht District of Isfahan County) in Jarqavieh County, Isfahan province, Iran.

== Demographics ==
=== Population ===
At the time of the 2006 National Census, the village's population was 699 in 183 households, when it was in Isfahan County. The following census in 2011 counted 730 people in 219 households. The 2016 census measured the population of the village as 724 people in 226 households.

In 2021, the district was separated from the county in the establishment of Jarqavieh County.
