= Allahabad, Jarqavieh Olya =

Village in Isfahan province, Iran

Allahabad Persian: الله اباد
- Village
- Location within Iran
- Coordinates: 32°05′03″N 52°35′44″E
- Country: Iran
- Province: Isfahan
- County: Jarqavieh
- District: Jarqavieh Olya
- Rural District: Jarqavieh Olya

Population (2016)
  - Total: 278
- Time zone: UTC+3:30 (IRST)

Allahabad (Persian: الله‌آباد) (Note: Also romanized as Allāhābād; also known as Yakhchal (يخچال)) is a village in Jarqavieh Olya Rural District of Jarqavieh Olya District (Note: Formerly Sepiddasht District of Isfahan County) in Jarqavieh County, Isfahan province, Iran.

== Demographics ==
=== Population ===
At the time of the 2006 National Census, the village's population was 255 in 69 households, when it was in Isfahan County. The following census in 2011 counted 274 people in 83 households. The 2016 census measured the population of the village as 278 people in 86 households.

In 2021, the district was separated from the county in the establishment of Jarqavieh County.
