= Heydarabad, Jarqavieh Vosta =

Village in Isfahan province, Iran

Heydarabad Persian: حيدراباد
- Village
- Location within Iran
- Coordinates: 32°16′21″N 52°18′11″E
- Country: Iran
- Province: Isfahan
- County: Jarqavieh
- District: Central
- Rural District: Jarqavieh Vosta

Population (2016)
  - Total: 732
- Time zone: UTC+3:30 (IRST)

Heydarabad (Persian: حيدراباد) (Note: Also romanized as Ḩeydarābād; also known as Haidarābād) is a village in Jarqavieh Vosta Rural District of the Central District (Note: Formerly Jarqavieh District and then Jarqavieh Sofla District of Isfahan County) in Jarqavieh County, Isfahan province, Iran.

== Demographics ==
=== Population ===
At the time of the 2006 National Census, the village's population was 632 in 162 households, when it was in Jarqavieh Sofla District (Note: Renamed the Central District of Jarqavieh County) of Isfahan County. The following census in 2011 counted 570 people in 187 households. The 2016 census measured the population of the village as 732 people in 250 households.

In 2021, the district was separated from the county in the establishment of Jarqavieh County and renamed the Central District.
