= Chalsara =

Village in Ilam province, Iran

Chalsara Persian: چال‌سرا
- Village
- Location within Iran Location within Ilam Province
- Coordinates: 33°37′02″N 46°23′18″E
- Country: Iran
- Province: Ilam
- County: Ilam
- District: Central
- Rural District: Deh Pain

Population (2016)
  - Total: 4,480
- Time zone: UTC+3:30 (IRST)

Chalsara (Persian: چال‌سرا) (Note: Also romanized as Chāl Sarā and Chālsarā) is a village in, and the capital of, Deh Pain Rural District of the Central District of Ilam County, Ilam province, Iran.

== Demographics ==
=== Ethnicity ===
The village is populated by Kurds.

=== Population ===
At the time of the 2006 National Census, the village's population was 2,910 in 606 households. The following census in 2011 counted 3,628 people in 904 households. The 2016 census measured the population of the village as 4,480 people in 1,241 households. It was the most populous village in its rural district.
