= Azar Khvaran =

Village in Isfahan province, Iran

Azarkhavaran Persian: آذرخواران
- Village
- Location within Iran
- Coordinates: 32°19′17″N 52°08′57″E
- Country: Iran
- Province: Isfahan
- County: Jarqavieh
- District: Central
- Rural District: Jarqavieh Vosta

Population (2016)
  - Total: 1,058
- Time zone: UTC+3:30 (IRST)

Azarkhavaran (Persian: آذرخواران) (Note: Also romanized as Āz̄ar Khvārān; also known as Azākhvārān, Azākhvorān, Azākhwarān, and Ḩabībābād (حبيب آباد)) is a village in Jarqavieh Vosta Rural District of the Central District (Note: Formerly Jarqavieh District and then Jarqavieh Sofla District of Isfahan County) in Jarqavieh County, Isfahan province, Iran.

== Demographics ==
=== Population ===
At the time of the 2006 National Census, the village's population was 1,193 in 356 households, when it was in Jarqavieh Sofla District (Note: Renamed the Central District of Jarqavieh County) of Isfahan County. The following census in 2011 counted 1,164 people in 374 households. The 2016 census measured the population of the village as 1,058 people in 370 households.

In 2021, the district was separated from the county in the establishment of Jarqavieh County and renamed the Central District.
