= Mazraeh-ye Arab =

Village in Isfahan province, Iran

Mazraeh-ye Arab Persian: مزرعه عرب
- Village
- Location within Iran
- Coordinates: 32°16′29″N 52°20′35″E
- Country: Iran
- Province: Isfahan
- County: Jarqavieh
- District: Central
- Rural District: Jarqavieh Vosta

Population (2016)
  - Total: 513
- Time zone: UTC+3:30 (IRST)

Mazraeh-ye Arab (Persian: مزرعه عرب) (Note: Also romanized as Mazra‘eh-ye ‘Arab) is a village in Jarqavieh Vosta Rural District of the Central District (Note: Formerly Jarqavieh District and then Jarqavieh Sofla District of Isfahan County) in Jarqavieh County, Isfahan province, Iran.

== Demographics ==
=== Population ===
At the time of the 2006 National Census, the village's population was 389 in 99 households, when it was in Jarqavieh Sofla District (Note: Renamed the Central District of Jarqavieh County) of Isfahan County. The following census in 2011 counted 419 people in 120 households. The 2016 census measured the population of the village as 513 people in 155 households.

In 2021, the district was separated from the county in the establishment of Jarqavieh County and renamed the Central District.
