= Fatemiyeh, Ilam =

Fatemiyeh فاطميه
- Village
- Location within Iran
- Coordinates: 33°37′33″N 46°22′18″E
- Country: Iran
- Province: Ilam
- County: Ilam
- Bakhsh: Central
- Rural District: Deh Pain

Population (2006)
  - Total: 1,411
- Time zone: UTC+3:30 (IRST)
  - Summer (DST): UTC+4:30 (IRDT)

Fatemiyeh (Persian: فاطميه, also Romanized as Fatemīyeh and Fāţemīyeh; also known as Farahābād) is a village in Deh Pain Rural District, in the Central District of Ilam County, Ilam Province, Iran. At the 2006 census, its population was 1,411, in 267 families. The village is populated by Kurds.
