= Kamalabad, Jarqavieh =

Village in Isfahan province, Iran

Kamalabad Persian: كمال اباد
- Village
- Location within Iran
- Coordinates: 32°09′20″N 52°37′57″E
- Country: Iran
- Province: Isfahan
- County: Jarqavieh
- District: Jarqavieh Olya
- Rural District: Jarqavieh Olya

Population (2016)
  - Total: 1,715
- Time zone: UTC+3:30 (IRST)

Kamalabad (Persian: كمال اباد) (Note: Also romanized as Kamālābād; also known as Kamal Abadé Jarghooyeh and Kamālābād-e Jarqūyeh) is a village in Jarqavieh Olya Rural District of Jarqavieh Olya District (Note: Formerly Sepiddasht District of Isfahan County) in Jarqavieh County, Isfahan province, Iran.

== Demographics ==
=== Population ===
At the time of the 2006 National Census, the village's population was 1,558 in 429 households, when it was in Isfahan County. The following census in 2011 counted 1,456 people in 436 households. The 2016 census measured the population of the village as 1,715 people in 549 households, the most populous in its rural district.

In 2021, the district was separated from the county in the establishment of Jarqavieh County.
