= Mobarakeh, Isfahan =

Village in Isfahan province, Iran

Mobarakeh Persian: مباركه
- Village
- Location within Iran
- Coordinates: 31°50′27″N 52°30′45″E
- Country: Iran
- Province: Isfahan
- County: Jarqavieh
- District: Jarqavieh Olya
- Rural District: Ramsheh

Population (2016)
  - Total: 290
- Time zone: UTC+3:30 (IRST)

Mobarakeh (Persian: مباركه) (Note: Also romanized as Mobārakeh; also known as Mobarakeh Pishkooh) is a village in Ramsheh Rural District of Jarqavieh Olya District (Note: Formerly Sepiddasht District of Isfahan County) in Jarqavieh County, Isfahan province, Iran.

== Demographics ==
=== Population ===
At the time of the 2006 National Census, the village's population was 301 in 85 households, when it was in Isfahan County. The following census in 2011 counted 297 people in 90 households. The 2016 census measured the population of the village as 290 people in 94 households.

In 2021, the district was separated from the county in the establishment of Jarqavieh County.
