= Baleyn =

Baleyn (Persian: بلين) may refer to:

- Baleyn, Ilam
- Baleyn, Eyvan, Ilam Province
- Baleyn, Lorestan
