= Baliyan =

Baliyan (Persian: بليين) may refer to:

- Baliyan, Eyvan, a village in Evyan County, Ilam Province, Iran
- Baliyan, Ilam, a village in Ilam County, Ilam Province, Iran
- Baliyan (surname)
