= Sian, Jarqavieh =

Village in Isfahan province, Iran

Sian Persian: سيان
- Village
- Location within Iran
- Coordinates: 32°23′03″N 52°09′11″E
- Country: Iran
- Province: Isfahan
- County: Jarqavieh
- District: Central
- Rural District: Jarqavieh Sofla

Population (2016)
  - Total: 319
- Time zone: UTC+3:30 (IRST)

Sian (Persian: سيان) (Note: Also romanized as Sīān; also known as Seyūn-e Namakī) is a village in Jarqavieh Sofla Rural District of the Central District (Note: Formerly Jarqavieh District and then Jarqavieh Sofla District of Isfahan County) in Jarqavieh County, Isfahan province, Iran.

The Shast-Sheshi festival, a rare surviving form of the ancient Zoroastrian feast of Khordadgan, is celebrated annually in Sian.

== Demographics ==
=== Population ===
At the time of the 2006 National Census, the village's population was 224 in 65 households, when it was in Jarqavieh Sofla District (Note: Renamed the Central District of Jarqavieh County) of Isfahan County. The following census in 2011 counted 223 people in 74 households. The 2016 census measured the population of the village as 319 people in 109 households, the most populous in its rural district.

In 2021, the district was separated from the county in the establishment of Jarqavieh County and renamed the Central District.
