= Jarqavieh Sofla =

Jarqavieh Sofla (Persian: جرقویه سفلی) may refer to:

- Jarqavieh Sofla District
- Jarqavieh Sofla Rural District
