= Haresabad =

Haresabad (Persian: حارث اباد) may refer to:

- Haresabad, Isfahan
- Haresabad, Razavi Khorasan
