= Jarqavieh Olya =

Jarqavieh Olya (Persian: جرقویه علیا) may refer to:

- Jarqavieh Olya District
- Jarqavieh Olya Rural District
