= Qala Qiran Castle =

Castle in Ilam Province, Iran

Qala Qiran castle
- قلعه قلا قیران

General information
- Type: Castle
- Location: Ilam County, Iran

Qala Qiran castle (Persian: قلعه قلا قیران) is a historical castle located in Ilam County in Ilam Province, The longevity of this fortress dates back to the Parthian Empire.
