= Baleyn, Ilam =

Village in Ilam, Iran

Baleyn بليين
- Village
- Location within Iran
- Coordinates: 33°33′20″N 46°26′22″E
- Country: Iran
- Province: Ilam
- County: Ilam
- Bakhsh: Central
- Rural District: Keshvari

Population (2006)
  - Total: 168
- Time zone: UTC+3:30 (IRST)
  - Summer (DST): UTC+4:30 (IRDT)

Baleyn (Persian: بليين; also known as Balban and Belbīn) is a village in Keshvari Rural District, in the Central District of Ilam County, Ilam Province, Iran. At the 2006 census, its population was 168, in 32 families. The village is populated by Kurds.
