= Paqala Hezarani Castle =

Castle in Ilam Province, Iran

Paqala Hezarani castle
- قلعه پاقلاع هزارانی
- Interactive map of the Paqala Hezarani castle area

General information
- Type: Castle
- Location: Ilam County, Iran
- Coordinates: 32.9477°N 47.4617°E

Paqala Hezarani castle (Persian: قلعه پاقلاع هزارانی) is a historical castle located in Ilam County in Ilam Province, The longevity of this fortress dates back to the Sasanian Empire.
