= Qarneh =

Village in Isfahan province, Iran

Qarneh Persian: قارنه
- Village
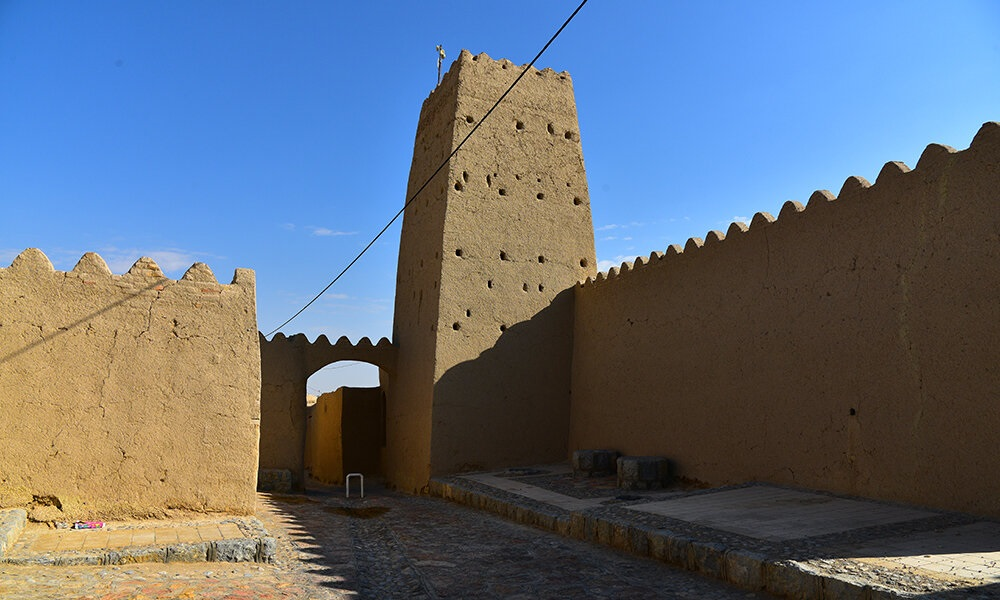
- The village of Qarneh

- Location within Iran
- Coordinates: 32°25′05″N 52°02′43″E
- Country: Iran
- Province: Isfahan
- County: Jarqavieh
- District: Central
- Rural District: Jarqavieh Sofla

Population (2016)
  - Total: 100
- Time zone: UTC+3:30 (IRST)

Qarneh (Persian: قارنه) (Note: Also romanized as Qārneh) is a village in Jarqavieh Sofla Rural District of the Central District (Note: Formerly Jarqavieh District and then Jarqavieh Sofla District of Isfahan County) in Jarqavieh County, Isfahan province, Iran.

== Demographics ==
=== Population ===
At the time of the 2006 National Census, the village's population was 74 in 25 households, when it was in Jarqavieh Sofla District (Note: Renamed the Central District of Jarqavieh County) of Isfahan County. The following census in 2011 counted 61 people in 23 households. The 2016 census measured the population of the village as 100 people in 41 households.

In 2021, the district was separated from the county in the establishment of Jarqavieh County and renamed the Central District.
