= Jafarabad, Ilam =

City in Ilam province, Iran

Jafarabad Persian: جعفراباد
- City
- Location within Iran Location within Ilam Province
- Coordinates: 33°30′18″N 46°32′17″E
- Country: Iran
- Province: Ilam
- County: Ilam
- District: Sivan

Population (2016)
  - Total: 2,737
- Time zone: UTC+3:30 (IRST)

Jafarabad (Persian: جعفراباد) (Note: Also romanized as Ja‘farābād; also known as Ja‘farābād-e Mīsh Khāş) is a city in, and the capital of, Sivan District of Ilam County, Ilam province, Iran. As a village, it was the capital of Mish Khas Rural District until its capital was transferred to the village of Meydan. There is a Reformed church in the village.

== Demographics ==
=== Ethnicity ===
The city is populated by Kurds.

=== Population ===
At the time of the 2006 National Census, Jafarabad's population was 2,092 in 435 households, when it was a village in Mish Khas Rural District of the Central District. The following census in 2011 counted 2,346 people in 596 households. The 2016 census measured the population of the village as 2,737 people in 621 households, by which time the rural district had been separated from the district in the formation of Sivan District. It was the most populous village in its rural district.

In 2019, Jafarabad was elevated to the status of a city.
