= Haresabad, Isfahan =

Village in Isfahan province, Iran

Haresabad Persian: حارث اباد
- Village
- Location within Iran
- Coordinates: 31°49′13″N 52°37′51″E
- Country: Iran
- Province: Isfahan
- County: Jarqavieh
- District: Jarqavieh Olya
- Rural District: Ramsheh

Population (2016)
  - Total: 277
- Time zone: UTC+3:30 (IRST)

Haresabad (Persian: حارث اباد) (Note: Also romanized as Ḩāres̄ābād; also known as Ḩādes̄ābād and Hārisābād) is a village in Ramsheh Rural District of Jarqavieh Olya District (Note: Formerly Sepiddasht District of Isfahan County) in Jarqavieh County, Isfahan province, Iran.

== Demographics ==
=== Population ===
At the time of the 2006 National Census, the village's population was 395 in 112 households, when it was in Isfahan County. The following census in 2011 counted 315 people in 106 households. The 2016 census measured the population of the village as 277 people in 99 households.

In 2021, the district was separated from the county in the establishment of Jarqavieh County.
