= Qarneh (disambiguation) =

Qarneh is a village in Isfahan Province, Iran.

Qarneh (Persian: قرنه) may also refer to:

- Qarneh, Razavi Khorasan
- Qarneh, West Azerbaijan
