= Malvajerd =

Village in Isfahan province, Iran

Malvajerd Persian: مالواجرد
- Village

- Location within Iran
- Coordinates: 32°04′32″N 52°34′43″E
- Country: Iran
- Province: Isfahan
- County: Jarqavieh
- District: Jarqavieh Olya
- Rural District: Jarqavieh Olya

Population (2016)
  - Total: 907
- Time zone: UTC+3:30 (IRST)

Malvajerd (Persian: مالواجرد) (Note: Also romanized as Māl Vājerd, Māl-e Vājerd, and Mālvājerd; also known as Malvard) is a village in Jarqavieh Olya Rural District of Jarqavieh Olya District (Note: Formerly Sepiddasht District of Isfahan County) in Jarqavieh County, Isfahan province, Iran.

== Demographics ==
=== Population ===
At the time of the 2006 National Census, the village's population was 904 in 280 households, when it was in Isfahan County. The following census in 2011 counted 853 people in 284 households. The 2016 census measured the population of the village as 907 people in 326 households.

In 2021, the district was separated from the county in the establishment of Jarqavieh County.
