= Nikabad =

City in Isfahan province, Iran

Nikabad Persian: نیک‌آباد
- City
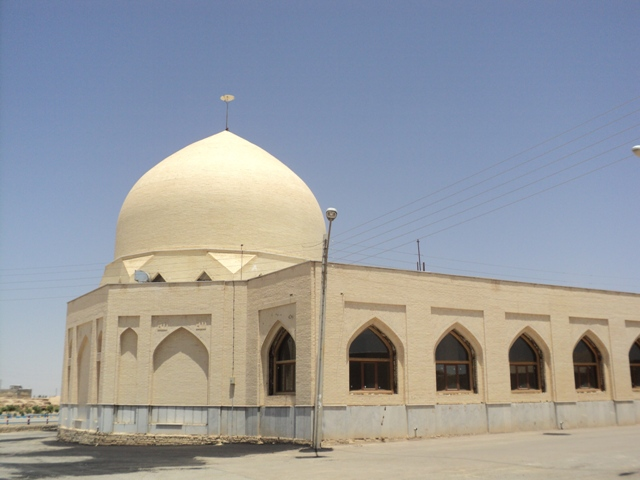
- Nikabad Jameh Mosque

- Location within Iran
- Coordinates: 32°18′12″N 52°12′07″E
- Country: Iran
- Province: Isfahan
- County: Jarqavieh
- District: Central

Population (2016)
  - Total: 4,364
- Time zone: UTC+3:30 (IRST)

Nikabad (Persian: نیک‌آباد) (Note: Also romanized as Nīkābād; formerly known as Yangabad, also romanized as Yangābād and Yengābād; also known as Jangābād and Yankābād. The name of the ancient city that was established during the Sasanian Empire period was Dasht-e Jahan) is a city in the Central District (Note: Formerly Jarqavieh District and then Jarqavieh Sofla District of Isfahan County) of Jarqavieh County, Isfahan province, Iran, serving as capital of both the county and the district. It is also the administrative center for Jarqavieh Vosta Rural District.

== Demographics ==
=== Language ===
The town is Persian-speaking.

=== Population ===
At the time of the 2006 National Census, the city's population was 4,164 in 1,156 households, when it was in Jarqavieh Sofla District (Note: Renamed the Central District of Jarqavieh County) of Isfahan County. The following census in 2011 counted 4,303 people in 1,327 households. The 2016 census measured the population of the city as 4,364 people in 1,442 households.

In 2021, the district was separated from the county in the establishment of Jarqavieh County and renamed the Central District.

== Notable people ==
Prominent Iranian cleric brothers Hassan Sanei and Yousef Saanei are from Nikabad.

== Gallery ==
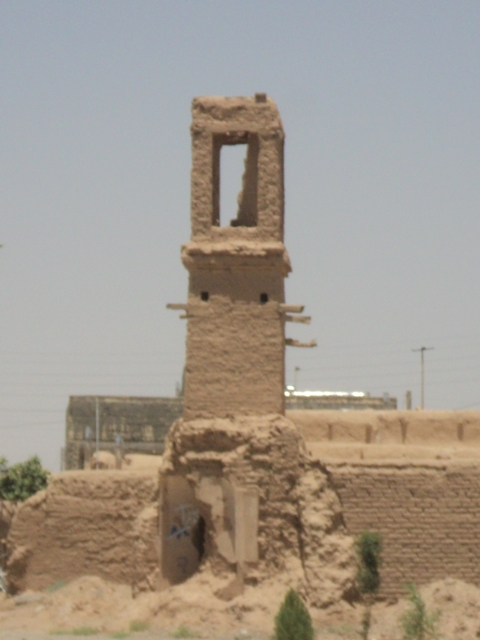
The historic windcatcher

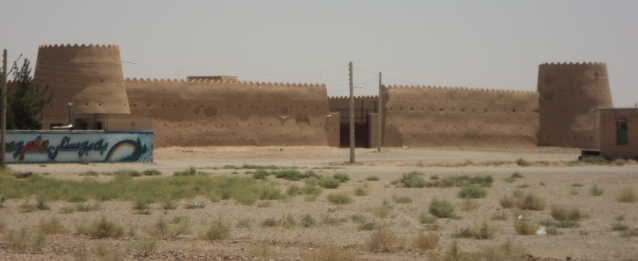
An historic citadel

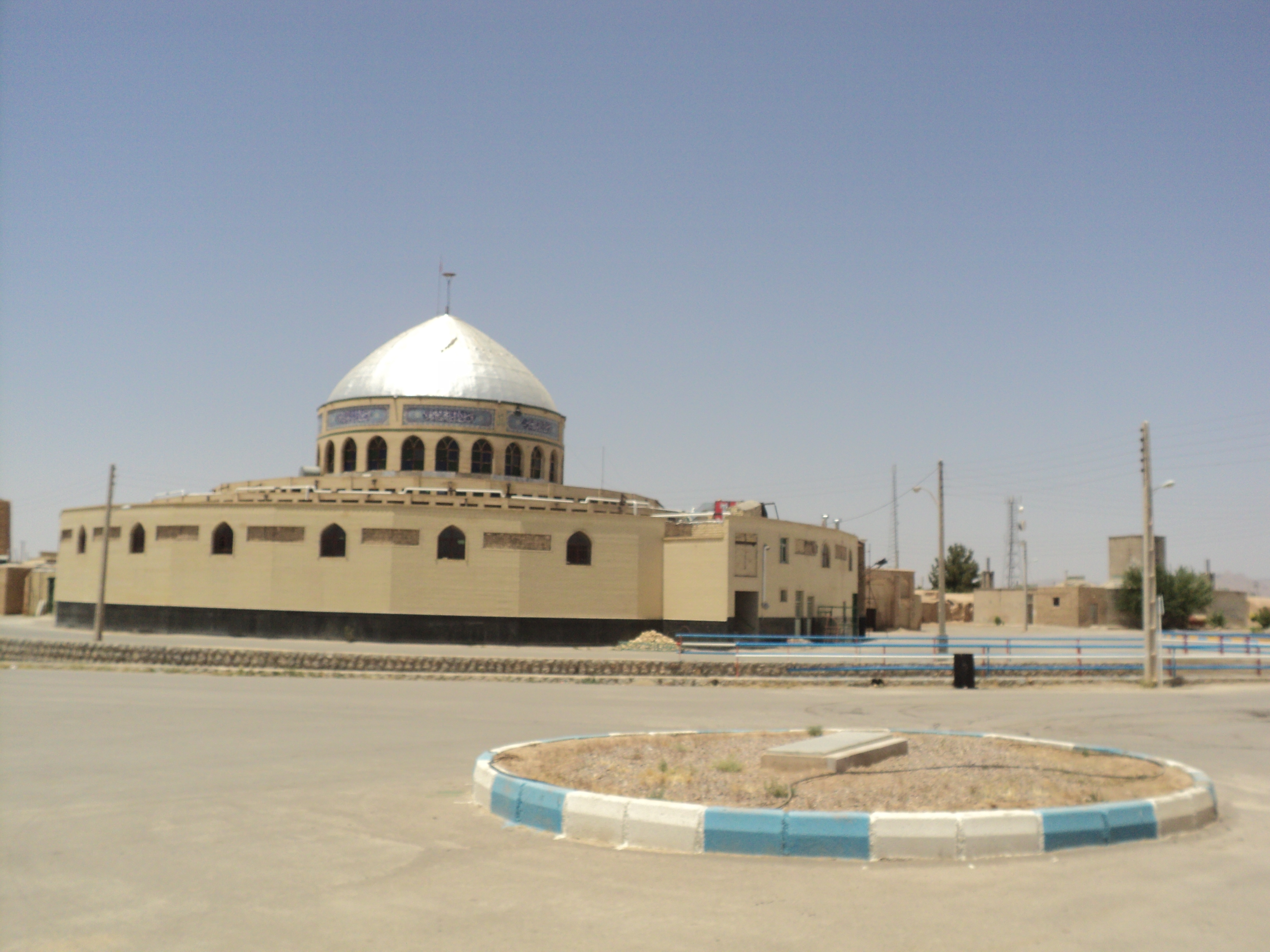
The shrine of Milamhmandali Alarm Bidgeli

== See also ==
- Peykan, Iran
- Malvajerd
