= Hasanabad, Isfahan =

City in Isfahan province, Iran

Hasanabad Persian: حسن اباد
- City
- Location within Iran
- Coordinates: 32°08′21″N 52°37′44″E
- Country: Iran
- Province: Isfahan
- County: Jarqavieh
- District: Jarqavieh Olya

Population (2016)
  - Total: 4,478
- Time zone: UTC+3:30 (IRST)

Hasanabad (Persian: حسن اباد) (Note: Also romanized as Ḩasanābād) is a city in, and the capital of, Jarqavieh Olya District (Note: Formerly Sepiddasht District of Isfahan County) of Jarqavieh County, Isfahan province, Iran. It also serves as the administrative center for Jarqavieh Olya Rural District.

== Demographics ==
=== Population ===
At the time of the 2006 National Census, the city's population was 4,342 in 1,197 households, when it was in Isfahan County. The following census in 2011 counted 4,267 people in 1,377 households. The 2016 census measured the population of the city as 4,478 people in 1,497 households.

In 2021, the district was separated from the county in the establishment of Jarqavieh County.
