= Ramsheh Rural District =

Rural district in Isfahan province, Iran

Ramsheh Rural District Persian: دهستان رامشه
- Rural District
- Location within Iran
- Coordinates: 31°44′N 52°40′E
- Country: Iran
- Province: Isfahan
- County: Jarqavieh
- District: Jarqavieh Olya
- Established: 1987
- Capital: Ramsheh

Population (2016)
  - Total: 4,942
- Time zone: UTC+3:30 (IRST)

Ramsheh Rural District (Persian: دهستان رامشه) is in Jarqavieh Olya District (Note: Formerly Sepiddasht District of Isfahan County) of Jarqavieh County, Isfahan province, Iran. Its capital is the village of Ramsheh.

== Demographics ==
=== Population ===
At the time of the 2006 National Census, the rural district's population (as a part of Isfahan County) was 4,731 in 1,418 households. There were 4,590 inhabitants in 1,505 households at the following census of 2011. The 2016 census measured the population of the rural district as 4,942 in 1,681 households. The most populous of its 24 villages was Ramsheh, with 3,131 people.

In 2021, the district was separated from the county in the establishment of Jarqavieh County.

=== Other villages in the rural district ===
- Ahmadabad
- Asadabad
- Esfandaran
- Feyzabad
- Haresabad
- Mobarakeh
