= Amordadegan festival =

Ancient Iranian tradition celebrated 127 days after Nowruz

The Amordadegan festival, also transliterated as Amordadegan or Amardadegan, is an ancient Iranian tradition celebrated 127 days after Nowruz. Amordadegan in Persian means "without death". The 5th month of Persian calendar is Mordad that came from Pahlavi Amurdad and Aveastan Ameretat word. The Amordadegan festival was celebrated by the Zoroastrians over 4000 years. It falls on the 7th day of the fifth Persian month, Mordad.

== See also ==
- List of festivals in Iran
- Boyce, Mary (1983), "Amurdād", Encyclopaedia Iranica, vol. 1, New York: Routledge & Kegan Paul, pp. 997–998
- Dhalla, Maneckji N. (1938), History of Zoroastrianism, New York: OUP, pp. 171–172
