= Nasrabad, Isfahan =

City in Isfahan province, Iran

Nasrabad Persian: نصرآباد
- City
- Location within Iran
- Coordinates: 32°16′47″N 52°03′36″E
- Country: Iran
- Province: Isfahan
- County: Jarqavieh
- District: Central

Population (2016)
  - Total: 6,425
- Time zone: UTC+3:30 (IRST)

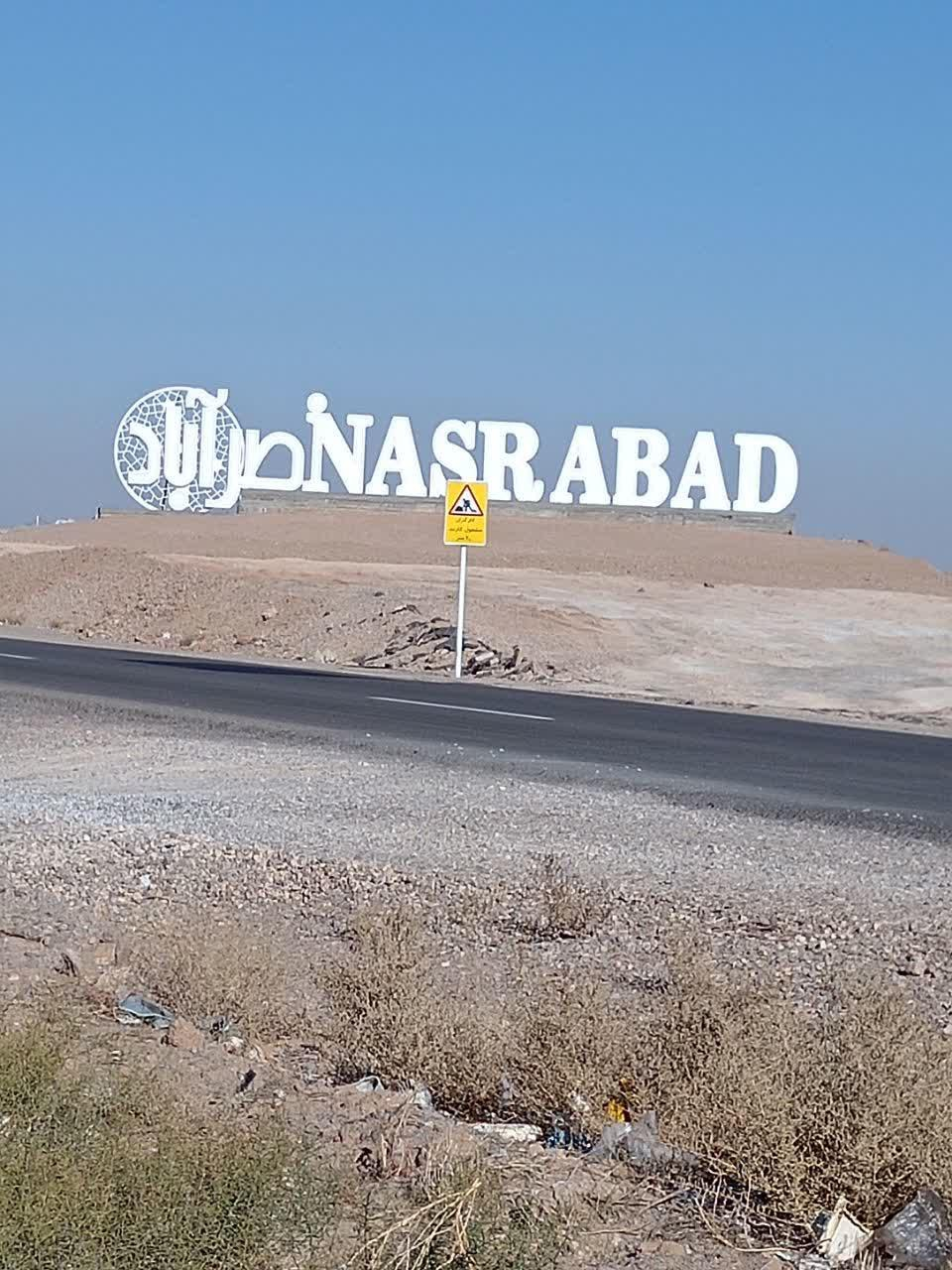
Entrance to the city of Nasrabad

Nasrabad (Persian: نصرآباد) (Note: Also romanized as Naşrābād; also known by its ancient name as Gīvān)) is a city in the Central District (Note: Formerly Jarqavieh District and then Jarqavieh Sofla District of Isfahan County) of Jarqavieh County, Isfahan province, Iran.

== Demographics ==
=== Population ===
At the time of the 2006 National Census, the city's population was 5,751 in 1,361 households, when it was in Jarqavieh Sofla District (Note: Renamed the Central District of Jarqavieh County) of Isfahan County. The following census in 2011 counted 6,176 people in 1,577 households. The 2016 census measured the population of the city as 6,425 people in 1,768 households.

In 2021, the district was separated from the county in the establishment of Jarqavieh County and renamed the Central District.
