= Mohammadabad, Jarqavieh =

City in Isfahan province, Iran

Mohammadabad Persian: محمدآباد
- City
- Location within Iran
- Coordinates: 32°19′29″N 52°06′44″E
- Country: Iran
- Province: Isfahan
- County: Jarqavieh
- District: Central
- Established as a city: 1996

Population (2016)
  - Total: 5,032
- Time zone: UTC+3:30 (IRST)

Mohammadabad (Persian: محمدآباد) (Note: Also romanized as Moḩammadābād; also known as Mohemmābād and Muhammadābād) is a city in the Central District (Note: Formerly Jarqavieh District and then Jarqavieh Sofla District of Isfahan County) of Jarqavieh County, Isfahan province, Iran, serving as the administrative center for Jarqavieh Sofla Rural District. The village of Mohammadabad was converted to a city in 1996.

== Demographics ==
=== Population ===
At the time of the 2006 National Census, the city's population was 4,391 in 1,093 households, when it was in Jarqavieh Sofla District (Note: Renamed the Central District of Jarqavieh County) of Isfahan County. The following census in 2011 counted 4,549 people in 1,295 households. The 2016 census measured the population of the city as 5,032 people in 1,482 households.

In 2021, the district was separated from the county in the establishment of Jarqavieh County and renamed the Central District.
