= Farahabad, Amol =

Farahabad فرح آباد
- Village
- Interactive map of Farahabad
- Coordinates: 36.534°N 52.387°E
- Country: Iran
- Province: Mazandaran
- County: Amol
- Bakhsh: Central
- Rural District: Harazpey-ye Jonubi

Population (2016)
  - Total: 65
- Time zone: UTC+3:30 (IRST)

Farahabad (Persian: فرح آباد, also Romanized as Faraḩābād) is a village in Harazpey-ye Jonubi Rural District, in the Central District of Amol County, Mazandaran Province, Iran.

At the time of the 2006 National Census, the village's population was 83 in 17 households. The following census in 2011 counted 59 people in 15 households. The 2016 census measured the population of the village as 65 people in 20 households.
