= Haft Cheshmeh-ye Dalun =

Village in Kohgiluyeh and Boyer-Ahmad, Iran

Haft Cheshmeh هفت چشمه دالون
- Village
- Location within Iran
- Coordinates: 31°03′45″N 50°11′37″E
- Country: Iran
- Province: Kohgiluyeh and Boyer-Ahmad
- County: Bahmai
- Bakhsh: Bahmai-ye Garmsiri
- Rural District: Sar Asiab-e Yusefi

Population (2006)
  - Total: 72
- Time zone: UTC+3:30 (IRST)
  - Summer (DST): UTC+4:30 (IRDT)

Haft Cheshmeh-ye Dalun (Persian: هفت چشمه دالون, also Romanized as Haft Cheshmeh-ye Dālūn; also known as Haft Cheshmeh) is a village in Sar Asiab-e Yusefi Rural District, Bahmai-ye Garmsiri District, Bahmai County, Kohgiluyeh and Boyer-Ahmad Province, Iran. At the 2006 census, its population was 72, in 19 families.
