= Hojjatabad, Zangiabad =

Hojjatabad حجت‌آباد
- Village
- Location within Iran
- Coordinates: 30°25′35″N 56°52′50″E
- Country: Iran
- Province: Kerman
- County: Kerman
- Bakhsh: Central
- Rural District: Zangiabad

Population (2006)
  - Total: 2,245
- Time zone: UTC+3:30 (IRST)
  - Summer (DST): UTC+4:30 (IRDT)

Hojjatabad (Persian: حجت‌آباد, also Romanized as Ḩojjatābād; also known as Faraḩābād (Persian: فرح‌آباد) and Shāhābād (Persian: شاه‌آباد)) is a village in Zangiabad Rural District, in the Central District of Kerman County, Kerman Province, Iran. At the 2006 census, its population was 2,245, in 510 families.
