= Farhadabad, Ilam =

Farhadabad فرهاداباد
- Village
- Location within Iran
- Coordinates: 32°57′29″N 47°26′08″E
- Country: Iran
- Province: Ilam
- County: Darreh Shahr
- Bakhsh: Central
- Rural District: Zarrin Dasht

Population (2006)
  - Total: 370
- Time zone: UTC+3:30 (IRST)
  - Summer (DST): UTC+4:30 (IRDT)

Farhadabad (Persian: فرهاداباد, also Romanized as Farhādābād; also known as Farhānābād) is a village in Zarrin Dasht Rural District, in the Central District of Darreh Shahr County, Ilam Province, Iran. At the 2006 census, its population was 370, in 82 families. The village is populated by Kurds.
