= Jarqavieh Sofla Rural District =

Rural district in Isfahan province, Iran

Jarqavieh Sofla Rural District Persian: دهستان جرقويه سفلي
- Rural District
- Location within Iran
- Coordinates: 32°09′N 52°11′E
- Country: Iran
- Province: Isfahan
- County: Jarqavieh
- District: Central
- Established: 1987
- Capital: Mohammadabad

Population (2016)
  - Total: 593
- Time zone: UTC+3:30 (IRST)

Jarqavieh Sofla Rural District (Persian: دهستان جرقويه سفلي) is in the Central District (Note: Formerly Jarqavieh District and then Jarqavieh Sofla District of Isfahan County) of Jarqavieh County, Isfahan province, Iran. It is administered from the city of Mohammadabad.

== Demographics ==
=== Population ===
At the time of the 2006 National Census, the rural district's population (as a part of Jarqavieh Sofla District (Note: Renamed the Central District of Jarqavieh County) in Isfahan County) was 460 in 151 households. There were 523 inhabitants in 159 households at the following census of 2011. The 2016 census measured the population of the rural district as 593 in 206 households. The most populous of its 64 villages was Sian, with 319 people.

In 2021, the district was separated from the county in the establishment of Jarqavieh County and renamed the Central District.

=== Other villages in the rural district ===
- Ganjabad
- Qarneh
