= Jarqavieh Vosta Rural District =

Rural district in Isfahan province, Iran

Jarqavieh Vosta Rural District Persian: دهستان جرقويه وسطي
- Rural District
- Location within Iran
- Coordinates: 32°16′N 52°17′E
- Country: Iran
- Province: Isfahan
- County: Jarqavieh
- District: Central
- Established: 1987
- Capital: Nikabad

Population (2016)
  - Total: 6,477
- Time zone: UTC+3:30 (IRST)

Jarqavieh Vosta Rural District (Persian: دهستان جرقويه وسطي) is in the Central District (Note: Formerly Jarqavieh District and then Jarqavieh Sofla District of Isfahan County) of Jarqavieh County, Isfahan province, Iran. It is administered from the city of Nikabad.

== Demographics ==
=== Population ===
At the time of the 2006 National Census, the rural district's population (as a part of Jarqavieh Sofla District (Note: Renamed the Central District of Jarqavieh County) in Isfahan County) was 6,204 in 1,712 households. There were 6,452 inhabitants in 2,015 households at the following census of 2011. The 2016 census measured the population of the rural district as 6,477 in 2,181 households. The most populous of its 25 villages was Peykan, with 2,760 people.

In 2021, the district was separated from the county in the establishment of Jarqavieh County and renamed the Central District.

=== Other villages in the rural district ===
- Azar Khvaran
- Heydarabad
- Hoseynabad
- Mazraeh-ye Arab
- Saadatabad
