= Matsalu Nature Film Festival =

Estonian film festival

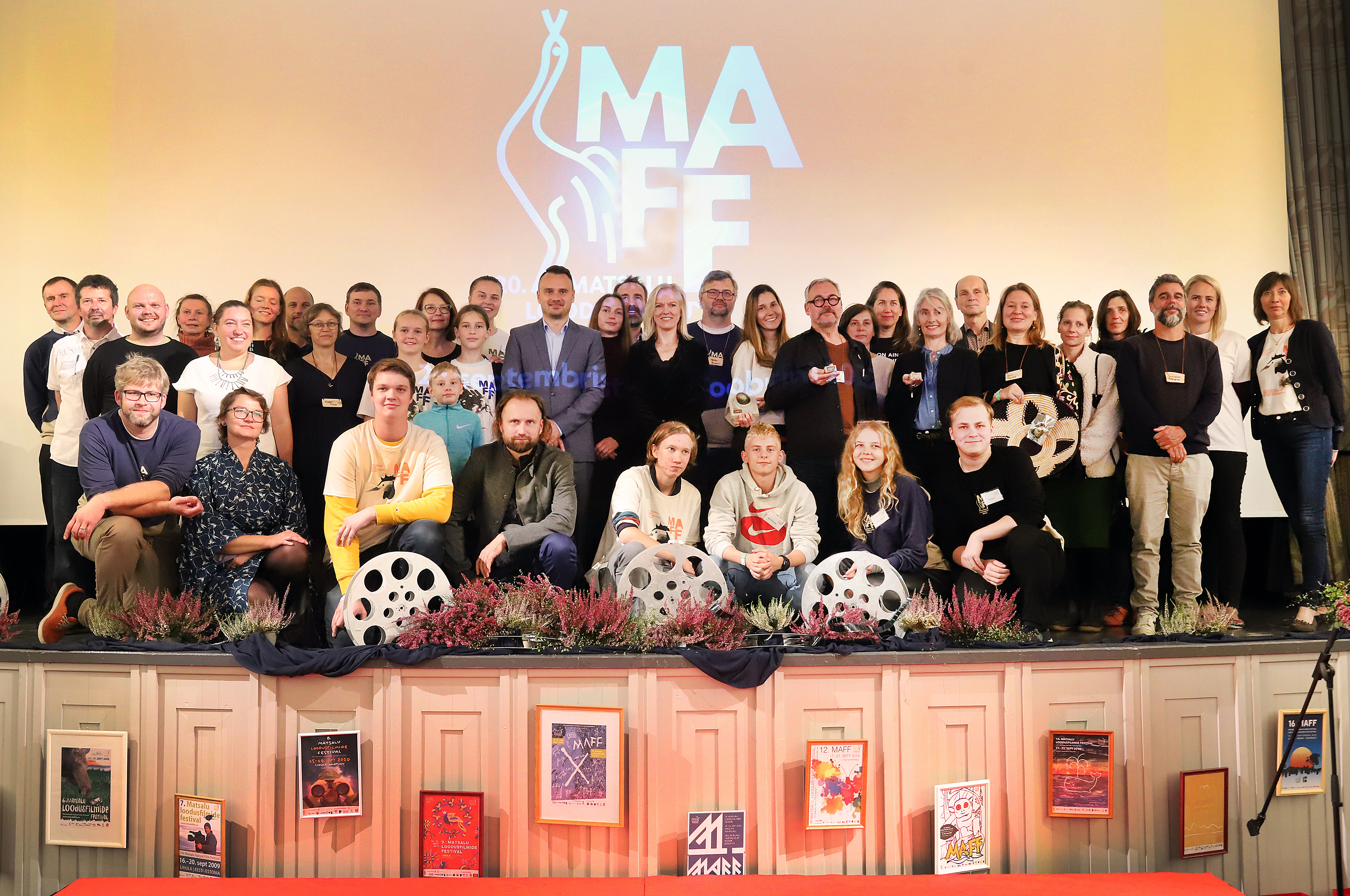
20th Matsalu Nature Film Festival

Matsalu Nature Film Festival (Estonian: Matsalu loodusfilmide festival, abbreviated MAFF) is an Estonian film festival which is focused on nature films.

MAFF predecessors were Nature Film Days, which took place 1983-1989 in Tallinn, and was led by Rein Maran.

First MAFF took place in 2003. The first MAFF lasted 3 days and 23 films from 7 countries were shown.

In 2019, over 1,000 films from 80 countries were shown.
