= Haft Cheshmeh-ye Lishtar =

Haft Cheshmeh-ye Lishtar هفت چشمه ليشتر
- Village
- Location within Iran
- Coordinates: 30°24′40″N 50°33′17″E
- Country: Iran
- Province: Kohgiluyeh and Boyer-Ahmad
- County: Gachsaran
- Bakhsh: Central
- Rural District: Lishtar

Population (2006)
  - Total: 161
- Time zone: UTC+3:30 (IRST)
  - Summer (DST): UTC+4:30 (IRDT)

Haft Cheshmeh-ye Lishtar (Persian: هفت چشمه ليشتر, also Romanized as Haft Cheshmeh-ye Līshtar; also known as Haft Chashmeh, Haft Cheshmeh, and Haft Cheshmeh-ye ‘Olyā) is a village in Lishtar Rural District, in the Central District of Gachsaran County, Kohgiluyeh and Boyer-Ahmad Province, Iran. At the 2006 census, its population was 161, in 30 families.
