= Jarqavieh Olya Rural District =

Rural district in Isfahan province, Iran

Jarqavieh Olya Rural District Persian: دهستان جرقويه عليا
- Rural District
- Location within Iran
- Coordinates: 32°08′N 52°40′E
- Country: Iran
- Province: Isfahan
- County: Jarqavieh
- District: Jarqavieh Olya
- Established: 1987
- Capital: Hasanabad

Population (2016)
  - Total: 5,296
- Time zone: UTC+3:30 (IRST)

Jarqavieh Olya Rural District (Persian: دهستان جرقويه عليا) is in Jarqavieh Olya District (Note: Formerly Sepiddasht District of Isfahan County) of Jarqavieh County, Isfahan province, Iran. It is administered from the city of Hasanabad.

== Demographics ==
=== Population ===
At the time of the 2006 National Census, the rural district's population (as a part of Isfahan County) was 5,026 in 1,438 households. There were 4,982 inhabitants in 1,597 households at the following census of 2011. The 2016 census measured the population of the rural district as 5,296 in 1,777 households. The most populous of its 20 villages was Kamalabad, with 1,715 people.

In 2021, the district was separated from the county in the establishment of Jarqavieh County.

=== Other villages in the rural district ===
- Allahabad
- Dastjerd
- Khara
- Malvajerd
