= Haft Cheshmeh, Khuzestan =

Haft Cheshmeh هفت چشمه
- Village
- Location within Iran
- Coordinates: 30°50′08″N 50°00′31″E
- Country: Iran
- Province: Khuzestan
- County: Behbahan
- Bakhsh: Tashan
- Rural District: Tashan-e Gharbi

Population (2006)
  - Total: 33
- Time zone: UTC+3:30 (IRST)
  - Summer (DST): UTC+4:30 (IRDT)

Haft Cheshmeh (Persian: هفت چشمه) is a village in Tashan-e Gharbi Rural District, Tashan District, Behbahan County, Khuzestan Province, Iran. At the 2006 census, its population was 33, in 7 families.
