= Ilam, Iran =

City in Ilam province, Iran

Ilam Persian: ايلام Îlam Kurdish: ئیلام
- City
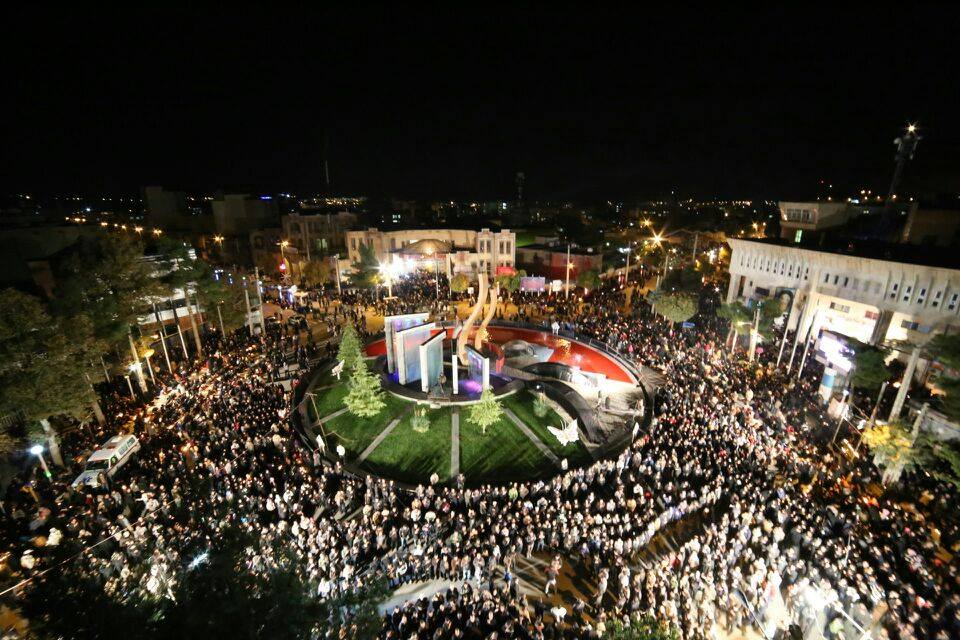
- A square in Ilam

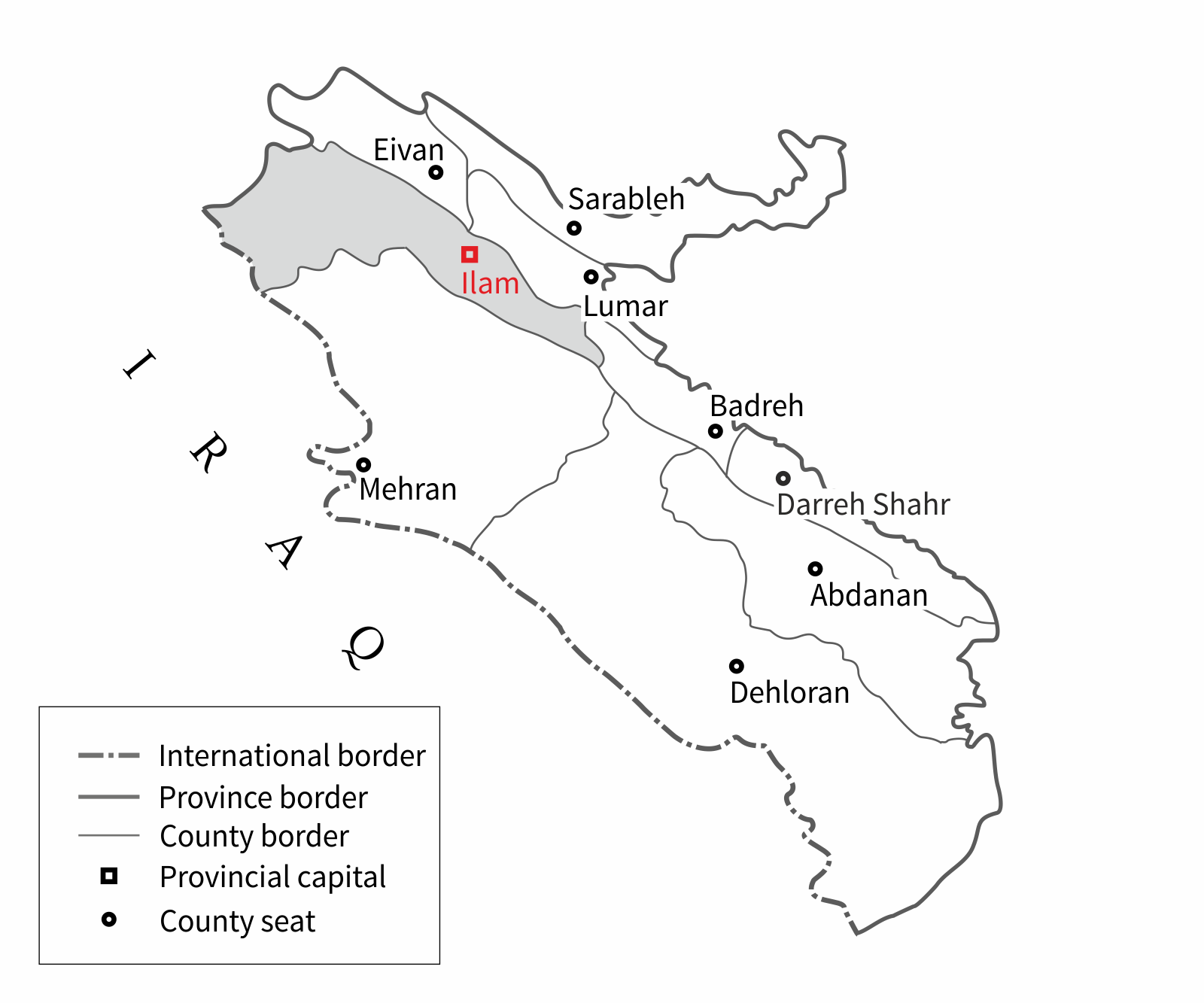
- Location of Ilam in Ilam province

- Location within Iran Location within Ilam Province
- Coordinates: 33°38′06″N 46°24′26″E
- Country: Iran
- Province: Ilam
- County: Ilam
- District: Central

Government
  - Mayor: Afshin Mozaffari
- Elevation: 1,427 m (4,682 ft)

Population (2016)
  - Total: 194,030
- Time zone: UTC+3:30 (IRST)
- Area code: 0843
- Climate: Csa
- Website: www.e-ilam.ir

Ilam (Persian: ايلام; ایلام, Kurdish: ئیلام/Îlam) (Note: Also romanized as Elām and Īlām; and (Kurdish: ئیلام), romanized as Îlam) is a city in the Central District of Ilam County, Ilam province, Iran, serving as capital of the province, the county, and the district. The Kabir Kuh mountain range lies east of the city. To the west, it borders Iraq.

== Demographics ==
=== Language ===
Language composition:

Ilam linguistic composition
Language	percent
Southern Kurdish	83%
New Persian	10%
Northern Luri	2%
Laki	2%
Mesopotamian Arabic	2%
Other	1%

=== Population ===
Population history
Year	Pop.	±%
1956	8,346	—
1966	15,493	+85.6%
1976	32,476	+109.6%
1986	89,035	+174.2%
1991	116,428	+30.8%
1996	126,346	+8.5%
2006	155,289	+22.9%
2011	172,213	+10.9%
2016	194,030	+12.7%

At the time of the 2006 National Census, the city's population was 155,289 in 34,549 households. The following census in 2011 counted 172,213 people in 42,613 households. The 2016 census measured the population of the rural district as 194,030 people in 53,581 households.

== Climate ==
Ilam is situated in the cold mountainous region of Iran at a height of 1,319 metres (4,330 ft) above mean sea level. It is located in the west of Iran at a latitude of 33° 38´ north and longitude of 46° 26´ east. Although this city is surrounded by mountains, its climate is also affected by deserts from the west and the south. This region presents a highly variable annual weather profile. Heavy showers or snow in the winter and dusty, brutally hot, dry weather in the summer are normal for this region. Monthly rainfalls have been as high as 352.1 millimetres (13.86 in) in March 1974, whilst daily rainfalls have reached 86 millimetres or 3.39 inches on 26 February 1991. Temperatures have ranged from a high of 47.0 °C or 116.6 °F on 20 August 1975 to a low of −15.0 °C or 5.0 °F on 5 February 1974.

Ilam's climate is classed under the Köppen climate classification as a Mediterranean climate (Csa) with continental influences.

Climate data for Ilam (normals 1991–2020, extremes 1967–2020)
Month	Jan	Feb	Mar	Apr	May	Jun	Jul	Aug	Sep	Oct	Nov	Dec	Year
Record high °C (°F)	23.1 (73.6)	21.0 (69.8)	28.2 (82.8)	32.2 (90.0)	41.6 (106.9)	40.9 (105.6)	43.0 (109.4)	47.0 (116.6)	40.0 (104.0)	35.2 (95.4)	32.0 (89.6)	27.5 (81.5)	47.0 (116.6)
Mean daily maximum °C (°F)	9.6 (49.3)	11.2 (52.2)	15.3 (59.5)	20.7 (69.3)	27.2 (81.0)	33.4 (92.1)	36.5 (97.7)	36.5 (97.7)	32.3 (90.1)	25.6 (78.1)	17.0 (62.6)	12.3 (54.1)	23.1 (73.6)
Daily mean °C (°F)	4.3 (39.7)	5.7 (42.3)	9.7 (49.5)	14.9 (58.8)	21.0 (69.8)	26.8 (80.2)	29.9 (85.8)	29.6 (85.3)	25.2 (77.4)	19.0 (66.2)	11.0 (51.8)	6.6 (43.9)	17.0 (62.6)
Mean daily minimum °C (°F)	−0.7 (30.7)	0.3 (32.5)	3.6 (38.5)	8.1 (46.6)	12.9 (55.2)	17.6 (63.7)	20.6 (69.1)	20.5 (68.9)	16.5 (61.7)	11.8 (53.2)	5.2 (41.4)	1.4 (34.5)	9.8 (49.7)
Record low °C (°F)	−14.0 (6.8)	−15.0 (5.0)	−11.0 (12.2)	−4.5 (23.9)	2.0 (35.6)	7.0 (44.6)	8.0 (46.4)	8.0 (46.4)	7.5 (45.5)	1.8 (35.2)	−7.4 (18.7)	−12.0 (10.4)	−15.0 (5.0)
Average precipitation mm (inches)	106.3 (4.19)	87.1 (3.43)	89.4 (3.52)	63.6 (2.50)	19.0 (0.75)	0.1 (0.00)	1.0 (0.04)	1.0 (0.04)	1.4 (0.06)	28.3 (1.11)	77.4 (3.05)	76.0 (2.99)	550.6 (21.68)
Average precipitation days (≥ 1.0 mm)	8.9	8	7.5	6.9	2.9	0.1	0.2	0.2	0.3	3.2	5.6	7.1	50.9
Average snowy days	6.0	3.7	1.8	0.3	0	0	0	0	0	0	0.3	2.2	14.3
Average relative humidity (%)	66	62	54	48	34	21	19	19	22	34	54	61	41
Average dew point °C (°F)	−2.3 (27.9)	−2.0 (28.4)	−0.5 (31.1)	2.5 (36.5)	2.7 (36.9)	1.4 (34.5)	2.9 (37.2)	2.6 (36.7)	0.5 (32.9)	1.0 (33.8)	0.8 (33.4)	−1.4 (29.5)	0.7 (33.2)
Mean monthly sunshine hours	177	180	219	236	288	351	354	347	313	256	204	180	3,105
Source 1: NOAA NCEI
Source 2: Iranian Meteorological Organisation(snow/sleet days 1986–2005)

Climate data for Ilam (1967 to 2005)
Month	Jan	Feb	Mar	Apr	May	Jun	Jul	Aug	Sep	Oct	Nov	Dec	Year
Record high °C (°F)	23.1 (73.6)	21.0 (69.8)	25.0 (77.0)	30.2 (86.4)	37.5 (99.5)	40.0 (104.0)	43.0 (109.4)	47.0 (116.6)	40.0 (104.0)	35.2 (95.4)	32.0 (89.6)	27.5 (81.5)	47.0 (116.6)
Mean daily maximum °C (°F)	9.0 (48.2)	10.2 (50.4)	14.0 (57.2)	19.8 (67.6)	26.3 (79.3)	32.4 (90.3)	35.8 (96.4)	35.3 (95.5)	31.6 (88.9)	24.9 (76.8)	17.1 (62.8)	11.7 (53.1)	22.4 (72.3)
Daily mean °C (°F)	4.4 (39.9)	5.4 (41.7)	8.8 (47.8)	14.2 (57.6)	20.1 (68.2)	25.2 (77.4)	28.5 (83.3)	28.1 (82.6)	24.4 (75.9)	18.6 (65.5)	11.6 (52.9)	6.8 (44.2)	16.3 (61.4)
Mean daily minimum °C (°F)	−0.3 (31.5)	0.6 (33.1)	3.7 (38.7)	8.6 (47.5)	13.8 (56.8)	18.1 (64.6)	21.2 (70.2)	20.8 (69.4)	17.3 (63.1)	12.3 (54.1)	6.3 (43.3)	1.9 (35.4)	10.4 (50.7)
Record low °C (°F)	−14 (7)	−15 (5)	−11 (12)	−3 (27)	3.0 (37.4)	7.0 (44.6)	8.0 (46.4)	8.0 (46.4)	7.5 (45.5)	1.9 (35.4)	−6.2 (20.8)	−12 (10)	−15 (5)
Average precipitation mm (inches)	117.5 (4.63)	103.9 (4.09)	123.1 (4.85)	70.1 (2.76)	26.1 (1.03)	0.5 (0.02)	0.6 (0.02)	0.3 (0.01)	1.1 (0.04)	26.2 (1.03)	80.3 (3.16)	94.8 (3.73)	644.5 (25.37)
Average precipitation days (≥ 1.0 mm)	9	8	10	7	4	0	0	0	0	3	6	8	55
Average relative humidity (%)	66	62	57	49	38	27	25	25	26	38	51	61	44
Source: Iranian Meteorological Organisation (archived)

== Architecture ==
Like many other regions of Iran, architecture in Ilam includis consists of a mix of both traditional and contemporary periods. Although easy access to fossil fuels and electricity may have aided the transition in Iranian architecture in other regions of Iran from its traditional to modern styles, the increasing population of Ilam may have also played a role in this transition.

The Governor Castle, Falahaty Mansion and The Mirgholam Castle are examples of some surviving traditional buildings in Ilam. The courtyard dwelling is the main type of the buildings of this period. This type of building was accepted as the main building type over all Iran for both climatic and cultural reasons. Brick is the main constructional material in these buildings. The passive thermal techniques indicated for the Iranian traditional buildings are commonly used in these buildings.

The Governor Castle of Ilam was built in type of courtyard. Adding shade and moisture by using green landscape, high trees and a pond, were the main passive techniques used in this building to reduce the temperature in summer. The Mirgholam Castle of Ilam presents a classic Iranian courtyard. The garden and the pound were the main elements of this type of buildings. The Falahaty Mansion used a pitched roof as it was regular beside the flat roofs in the traditional buildings in Ilam earlier.

== Colleges and universities ==
Ilam contains the following universities:

- Ilam University of Medical Sciences
- University of Ilam
- Islamic Azad University of Ilam
- Safir Danesh
- Farhangian University, Shahid Modares Campus of Ilam (Men) and Imam Jafar -e- Sadiqh Campus of Ilam (Women)

== Notable people ==
- Mohsen Amiri, footballer
- Fathollah Amiri, filmmaker

== See also ==
- Eyvan

Media related to Ilam at Wikimedia Commons
