= Bahmanagān =

Zoroastrian Iranian festival

Bahmanagān (Persian: بهمنگان) or BAHMANJANA (Arabicized form of Middle Persian Bahmanagān; forms such as Bahmaṇča (Persian: بهمنجه) or Bahmaṇčena are also found) was a Zoroastrian Iranian festival which was maintained until the Mongol invasion by Iranian Muslims. It takes place on the 2nd day of Bahman.

== Festival ==
In the old Zoroastrian calendar, when the day of the month coincides with the name of the month, then a feast (Persian: Jashn) was held. In this case, the month of Bahman which was the 11th month coincides with the day of Bahman (Bahman-rūz). Bahman is one of the archangels of Zoroastrianism. Henceforth, for each such a day in the calendar, the Middle Persian names of these were formed by addition of the suffix agān (association suffix and also a plural suffix) to the day-name. Festivities to celebrate the day took place among both the common people as well as the people associated with the courts. The festival is recorded by many authors including Biruni, Gardizi, Asadi Tusi, Anwari etc. According to Biruni and Gardizi, in Khorasan, an assortment of meat and all sorts of grain, vegetables, and fruits were cooked together in a pot called dīg-e Bahmanjana (the pot of Bahmanagān). The population cooked this dish, treated each other to this dish and also sold it on the Bazar. According to Gardizi, the flowers of the plant named the red-Bahman (Persian: Bahman-e Sorkh) were mixed with fresh milk. He further continues that the people believed it to be beneficial for the memory as well to keep away the evil eye. It was usual to wear new clothes for this festival.

Today, the modern day Zoroastrian-Iranian festival of Bahmanrūz continues to be an especially holy day for Zoroastrians of Iran.

=== Bahman Plant ===
This plant is the same as the equivalent modern Persian term zardak-e ṣaḥrāʾī (a wild carrot), which blooms in the month of Bahman (January–February). It has a red or white root. Since it was a medical plant, it is mentioned in Arabic medical texts from which it passed into Latin and in the form béhen into French. Two varieties, béhen rouge and béhen blanc, are found and still used in medicine.
