= Farahabad, Zarand =

Farahabad فرح اباد
- Village
- Location within Iran
- Coordinates: 30°48′17″N 56°06′10″E
- Country: Iran
- Province: Kerman
- County: Zarand
- Bakhsh: Central
- Rural District: Jorjafak

Population (2006)
  - Total: 23
- Time zone: UTC+3:30 (IRST)
  - Summer (DST): UTC+4:30 (IRDT)

Farahabad (Persian: فرح اباد, also Romanized as Faraḩābād; also known as Farābād) is a village in Jorjafak Rural District, in the Central District of Zarand County, Kerman Province, Iran. At the 2006 census, its population was 23, in 8 families.
