= Farhadabad, Fars =

Farhadabad فرهاداباد
- Village
- Location within Iran
- Coordinates: 29°43′22″N 51°33′00″E
- Country: Iran
- Province: Fars
- County: Kazerun
- Bakhsh: Central
- Rural District: Deris

Population (2006)
  - Total: 106
- Time zone: UTC+3:30 (IRST)
  - Summer (DST): UTC+4:30 (IRDT)

Farhadabad (Persian: فرهاداباد, also Romanized as Farhādābād) is a village in Deris Rural District, in the Central District of Kazerun County, Fars province, Iran. At the 2006 census, its population was 106, in 27 families.
