= Shast-Sheshi festival =

A 20-rial ticket issued for entry into the pool area during the festival in the 1970s

The Shast-Sheshi festival (or Shast-o-Shashi; of or related to "sixty-six" in Persian) is held annually in the village of Sian in the Jarquyeh County (Jarqavieh) of Isfahan Province in Iran. Beginning on the sixty-sixth day after Nowruz (the Iranian New Year), the festival corresponds in date and function to the pre-Islamic Zoroastrian feast of Khordadgan, dedicated to the divinity Khordad, the female guardian of water. Historically, its central rite involved immersion in the Shah Cheshme spring (now dry), along with visits to nearby sacred sites associated with women, fertility, and water. Although held around a Shia shrine complex, the event remains largely secular and draws thousands of visitors, featuring a temporary market, vendors, and street performances.

A rare surviving form of Khordadgan, it is not known when the original festival name was replaced by Shast-Sheshi. As with other Zoroastrian festivals preserved among Muslim communities—such as Tirema Sizda (Tiragan) in Mazandaran, Esbandi (Spandarmadagan) in Kashan, and the Qalishuyan festival (a survival of Mehregan) in Ardahal—participants are generally unaware of its Zoroastrian origins. Despite infrastructural loss and pressures by the government to recast the event as an Islamic pilgrimage, the festival continues to be widely attended and remains a significant cultural tradition within Jarquyeh.
