= Haft Cheshmeh, Kohgiluyeh and Boyer-Ahmad =

Village in Kohgiluyeh and Boyer-Ahmad, Iran

Haft Cheshmeh هفت چشمه
- Village
- Location within Iran
- Coordinates: 31°04′07″N 51°01′49″E
- Country: Iran
- Province: Kohgiluyeh and Boyer-Ahmad
- County: Boyer-Ahmad
- Bakhsh: Margown
- Rural District: Margown

Population (2006)
  - Total: 238
- Time zone: UTC+3:30 (IRST)
  - Summer (DST): UTC+4:30 (IRDT)

Haft Cheshmeh (Persian: هفت چشمه) is a village in Margown Rural District, Margown District, Boyer-Ahmad County, Kohgiluyeh and Boyer-Ahmad Province, Iran. At the 2006 census, its population was 238, in 45 families.
