= Haft Cheshmeh, Kuzaran =

Haft Cheshmeh هفتچشمه
- Village
- Location within Iran
- Coordinates: 34°29′32″N 46°30′27″E
- Country: Iran
- Province: Kermanshah
- County: Kermanshah
- Bakhsh: Kuzaran
- Rural District: Sanjabi

Population (2006)
  - Total: 341
- Time zone: UTC+3:30 (IRST)
  - Summer (DST): UTC+4:30 (IRDT)

Haft Cheshmeh (Persian: هفتچشمه, also Romanized as Haftcheshmeh) is a village in Sanjabi Rural District, Kuzaran District, Kermanshah County, Kermanshah Province, Iran. At the 2006 census, its population was 341, in 63 families.
