= Fur Khorj =

Fur Khorj فورخورج
- Village
- Location within Iran
- Coordinates: 27°45′47″N 56°25′21″E
- Country: Iran
- Province: Hormozgan
- County: Bandar Abbas
- Bakhsh: Fin
- Rural District: Siyahu

Population (2006)
  - Total: 315
- Time zone: UTC+3:30 (IRST)
  - Summer (DST): UTC+4:30 (IRDT)

Fur Khorj (Persian: فورخورج, also Romanized as Fūr Khorj; also known as Faraḩābād, Forkhoraj, and Fūrkhorī) is a village in Siyahu Rural District, Fin District, Bandar Abbas County, Hormozgan Province, Iran. At the 2006 census, its population was 315, in 88 families.
