= Keshvari Rural District =

Rural district in Ilam province, Iran

Keshvari Rural District Persian: دهستان کشوری
- Rural District
- Location within Iran Location within Ilam Province
- Coordinates: 33°35′04″N 46°25′08″E
- Country: Iran
- Province: Ilam
- County: Ilam
- District: Central
- Capital: Shahrak-e Shahid Keshvari

Population (2016)
  - Total: 7,787
- Time zone: UTC+3:30 (IRST)

Keshvari Rural District (Persian: دهستان کشوری) is in the Central District of Ilam County, Ilam province, Iran. Its capital is the village of Shahrak-e Shahid Keshvari.

== History ==
Keshvari Rural District was created in the Central District after the 2011 National Census.

== Demographics ==
=== Population ===
At the time of the 2016 census, the rural district's population was 4,549 in 1,454 households. The most populous of its eight villages was Shahrak-e Shahid Keshvari, with 5,092 people.
