= Baliyan, Eyvan =

Village in Ilam, Iran

Baliyan بليين
- Village
- Location within Iran
- Coordinates: 33°51′40″N 46°11′38″E
- Country: Iran
- Province: Ilam
- County: Eyvan
- Bakhsh: Central
- Rural District: Nabovat

Population (2006)
  - Total: 115
- Time zone: UTC+3:30 (IRST)
  - Summer (DST): UTC+4:30 (IRDT)

Baliyan (Persian: بليين, also Romanized as Balīyan; also known as Baleyn) is a village in Nabovat Rural District, in the Central District of Eyvan County, Ilam Province, Iran. At the 2006 census, its population was 115, in 23 families. The village is populated by Kurds.
