= Cinéma Vérité (film festival) =

Iranian documentary film festival

Cinema Vérité, also known as the Iran International Documentary Film Festival, is a film festival held in Tehran, Iran.

== History ==
The 17th Cinema Vérité festival, was held 18-23 December, 2023 at the Charsou Cineplex in Tehran.

== Description ==
The 18th edition of the festival is being held in December 2024, with more than 2,300 foreign documentaries from 123 countries submitted for screening and competition.

== Governance ==
The festival is organised by the Documentary, Experimental & Animation Film Center (DEFC), with the next edition scheduled for December 2024.

== Awards ==
An international jury awards the following prizes (as of 2024: 1. Best Full-Length Documentary (longer than 60 minutes) 2. Best Mid-Length Documentary (40 to 60 minutes) 3. Best Short Documentary (up to 40 minutes) 4. Special Jury Prize

There are also a number of other categories of awards for Iranian films.
