= Farhadabad, Selseleh =

Farhadabad فرهاداباد
- Village
- Location within Iran
- Coordinates: 33°51′39″N 48°18′36″E
- Country: Iran
- Province: Lorestan
- County: Selseleh
- Bakhsh: Central
- Rural District: Qaleh-ye Mozaffari

Population (2006)
  - Total: 121
- Time zone: UTC+3:30 (IRST)
  - Summer (DST): UTC+4:30 (IRDT)

Farhadabad (Persian: فرهاداباد, also Romanized as Farhādābād; also known as Faraḩābād and Farhādābād Saqi) is a village in Qaleh-ye Mozaffari Rural District, in the Central District of Selseleh County, Lorestan Province, Iran. At the 2006 census, its population was 121, in 19 families.
