= Farhadabad, Kurdistan =

Farhadabad فرهاد آباد
- Village
- Location within Iran
- Coordinates: 35°24′53″N 47°36′49″E
- Country: Iran
- Province: Kurdistan
- County: Qorveh
- Bakhsh: Serishabad
- Rural District: Lak

Population (2006)
  - Total: 75
- Time zone: UTC+3:30 (IRST)
  - Summer (DST): UTC+4:30 (IRDT)

Farhadabad (Persian: فرهاد آباد, also Romanized as Farhādābād; also known as Faraḩābād and Farehābād) is a village in Lak Rural District, Serishabad District, Qorveh County, Kurdistan Province, Iran. At the 2006 census, its population was 75, in 18 families. The village is populated by Kurds.
