= Deh Pain Rural District =

Rural district in Ilam province, Iran

Deh Pain Rural District Persian: دهستان ده پائين
- Rural District
- Location within Iran Location within Ilam Province
- Coordinates: 33°37′14″N 46°16′56″E
- Country: Iran
- Province: Ilam
- County: Ilam
- District: Central
- Capital: Chalsara

Population (2016)
  - Total: 13,726
- Time zone: UTC+3:30 (IRST)

Deh Pain Rural District (Persian: دهستان ده پائين) is in the Central District of Ilam County, Ilam province, Iran. Its capital is the village of Chalsara.

== Demographics ==
=== Population ===
At the time of the 2006 National Census, the rural district's population was 16,909 in 3,457 households. There were 19,898 inhabitants in 4,829 households at the following census of 2011. The 2016 census measured the population of the rural district as 13,726 in 3,714 households. The most populous of its 11 villages was Chalsara, with 4,480 people.
