= Mish Khas Rural District =

Rural district in Ilam province, Iran

Mish Khas Rural District Persian: دهستان ميش خاص
- Rural District
- Location within Iran Location within Ilam Province
- Coordinates: 33°30′56″N 46°33′51″E
- Country: Iran
- Province: Ilam
- County: Ilam
- District: Sivan
- Capital: Meydan

Population (2016)
  - Total: 7,227
- Time zone: UTC+3:30 (IRST)

Mish Khas Rural District (Persian: دهستان ميش خاص) is in Sivan District of Ilam County, Ilam province, Iran. Its capital is the village of Meydan. The previous capital of the rural district was the village of Jafarabad (now a city).

== Demographics ==
=== Population ===
At the time of the 2006 National Census, the rural district's population (as a part of the Central District) was 9,164 in 1,823 households. There were 9,412 inhabitants in 2,268 households at the following census of 2011. The 2016 census measured the population of the rural district as 7,227 in 1,988 households, by which time the rural district had been separated from the district in the establishment of Sivan District. The most populous of its 21 villages was Jafarabad (now a city), with 2,737 people.
