= Sivan District =

District in Ilam province, Iran

Sivan District Persian: بخش سیوان
- District
- Location within Iran Location within Ilam Province
- Coordinates: 33°32′38″N 46°32′46″E
- Country: Iran
- Province: Ilam
- County: Ilam
- Capital: Jafarabad

Population (2016)
  - Total: 8,994
- Time zone: UTC+3:30 (IRST)

Sivan District (Persian: بخش سیوان) is in Ilam County, Ilam province, Iran. Its capital is the city of Jafarabad.

== History ==
After the 2011 National Census, Mish Khas Rural District was separated from the Central District in the formation of Sivan District.

In 2019, the village of Jafarabad was elevated to the status of a city. In 2023, Mahmudabad Rural District was created in the district, and Alishervan Rural District was separated from it to join Badreh County.

== Demographics ==
=== Population ===
At the time of the 2016 census, the district's population was 8,994 inhabitants in 2,465 households.

=== Administrative divisions ===
Sivan District Population
Administrative Divisions	2016
Alishervan RD (Note: Transferred to Badreh County after the 2016 census)	1,767
Mahmudabad RD (Note: Established after the 2016 census)	
Mish Khas RD	7,227
Jafarabad (city) (Note: Became a city after the 2016 census)	
Total	8,994
RD = Rural District
