= Central District (Jarqavieh County) =

District in Isfahan province, Iran

Central District (Jarqavieh County) Persian: بخش مرکزی شهرستان جرقویه
- District
- Location within Iran
- Coordinates: 32°09′N 52°11′E
- Country: Iran
- Province: Isfahan
- County: Jarqavieh
- Capital: Nikabad

Population (2016)
  - Total: 22,891 (Note: As Jarqavieh Sofla District of Isfahan County)
- Time zone: UTC+3:30 (IRST)

The Central District of Jarqavieh County (Persian: بخش مرکزی شهرستان جرقویه) (Note: Formerly Jarqavieh District (بخش جرقویه) and then Jarqavieh Sofla District of Isfahan County) is in Isfahan province, Iran. Its capital is the city of Nikabad.

== History ==
In 2021, Jarqavieh Olya and Jarqavieh Sofla (Note: Renamed the Central District of Jarqavieh County) Districts were separated from Isfahan County in the establishment of Jarqavieh County, which was divided into two districts of two rural districts each, with Nikabad as its capital.

The Shast-Sheshi festival is held annually in the region. The festival corresponds in date and function to the pre-Islamic Zoroastrian feast of Khordadgan, dedicated to the divinity Khordad, the female guardian of water.

== Demographics ==
=== Population ===
At the time of the 2006 National Census, the district's population (as a Jarqavieh Sofla District of Isfahan County) was 20,970 in 5,473 households. The following census in 2011 counted 22,003 people in 6,373 households. The 2016 census measured the population of the district as 22,891 in 7,079 households.

=== Administrative divisions ===
Central District (Jarqavieh County) Population (Note: As Jarqavieh Sofla District of Isfahan County at the 2006, 2011, and 2016 censuses)
Administrative Divisions	2006	2011	2016
Jarqavieh Sofla RD	460	523	593
Jarqavieh Vosta RD	6,204	6,452	6,477
Mohammadabad (city)	4,391	4,549	5,032
Nasrabad (city)	5,751	6,176	6,425
Nikabad (city)	4,164	4,303	4,364
Total	20,970	22,003	22,891
RD: Rural District
