= Central District (Ilam County) =

District in Ilam province, Iran

Central District (Ilam County) Persian: بخش مرکزی شهرستان ایلام
- District
- Location within Iran Location within Ilam Province
- Coordinates: 33°37′12″N 46°17′41″E
- Country: Iran
- Province: Ilam
- County: Ilam
- Capital: Ilam

Population (2016)
  - Total: 215,543
- Time zone: UTC+3:30 (IRST)

The Central District of Ilam County (Persian: بخش مرکزی شهرستان ایلام) is in Ilam province, Iran. Its capital is the city of Ilam.

== History ==
After the 2011 National Census, Keshvari Rural District was created in the district, and Mishkhas Rural District was separated from it in the formation of Sivan District.

== Demographics ==
=== Population ===
At the time of the 2006 census, the district's population was 181,362 in 39,829 households. The following census in 2011 counted 201,523 people in 49,710 households. The 2016 census measured the population of the district as 215,543 inhabitants in 59,440 households.

=== Administrative divisions ===
Central District (Ilam County) Population
Administrative Divisions	2006	2011	2016
Deh Pain RD	16,909	19,898	13,726
Keshvari RD			7,787
Mishkhas RD (Note: Transferred to Sivan District)	9,164	9,412	
Ilam (city)	155,289	172,213	194,030
Total	181,362	201,523	215,543
RD = Rural District
