= Jarqavieh Olya District =

District in Isfahan province, Iran

Jarqavieh Olya District Persian: بخش جرقویه علیا
- District
- Location within Iran
- Coordinates: 31°53′N 52°40′E
- Country: Iran
- Province: Isfahan
- County: Jarqavieh
- Established: 1993
- Capital: Hasanabad

Population (2016)
  - Total: 14,716
- Time zone: UTC+3:30 (IRST)

Jarqavieh Olya District (Persian: بخش جرقویه علیا) (Note: Formerly Sefiddasht District (بخش سفیددشت)) is in Jarqavieh County, Isfahan province, Iran. Its capital is the city of Hasanabad.

== History ==
In 2021, Jarqavieh Olya and Jarqavieh Sofla (Note: Formerly Jarqavieh District; renamed the Central District of Jarqavieh County) Districts were separated from Isfahan County in the establishment of Jarqavieh County, which was divided into two districts of two rural districts each, with the city of Nikabad as its capital.

== Demographics ==
=== Population ===
At the time of the 2006 National Census, the district's population (as a part of Isfahan County) was 14,099 in 4,053 households. The following census in 2011 counted 13,839 people in 4,479 households. The 2016 census measured the population of the district as 14,716 in 4,955 households.

=== Administrative divisions ===
Jarqavieh Olya District Population (Note: As a part of Isfahan County at the 2006, 2011, and 2016 censuses)
Administrative Divisions	2006	2011	2016
Jarqavieh Olya RD	5,026	4,982	5,296
Ramsheh RD	4,731	4,590	4,942
Hasanabad (city)	4,342	4,267	4,478
Total	14,099	13,839	14,716
RD = Rural District
