= Ilam County =

County in Ilam Province, Iran

Ilam County Persian: شهرستان ایلام
- County
- Location of Ilam County in Ilam province (top left, green)

- Location of Ilam Province in Iran
- Coordinates: 33°34′N 46°27′E
- Country: Iran
- Province: Ilam
- Capital: Ilam
- Districts: Central, Sivan

Population (2016)
  - Total: 235,144
- Time zone: UTC+3:30 (IRST)

Ilam County (Persian: شهرستان ایلام) is in Ilam Province, Iran. Its capital is the city of Ilam.

== History ==
After the 2011 National Census, Keshvari Rural District was created in the Central District, and Mish Khas Rural District was separated from it in the formation of Sivan District, including the new Alishervan Rural District.

In 2019, the village of Jafarabad was elevated to the status of a city. Chavar District (Note: Renamed the Central District of Chavar County) was separated from the county in the establishment of Chavar County.

In 2023, Mahmudabad Rural District was created in Sivan District, and Alishervan Rural District was separated from it to join Badreh County.

== Demographics ==
=== Population ===
At the time of the 2006 census, the county's population was 193,222 in 42,207 households. The following census in 2011 counted 213,579 people in 52,391 households. The 2016 census measured the population of the county as 235,144 in 64,671 households.

=== Administrative divisions ===
Ilam County's population history and administrative structure over three consecutive censuses are shown in the following table.

Ilam County Population
Administrative Divisions	2006	2011	2016
Central District	181,362	201,523	215,543
Deh Pain RD	16,909	19,898	13,726
Keshvari RD			7,787
Mishkhas RD	9,164	9,412	
Ilam (city)	155,289	172,213	194,030
Chavar District (Note: Transferred to Chavar County after the 2016 census and renamed the Central District of Chavar County)	11,860	11,710	10,554
Arkavazi RD	4,640	4,384	3,702
Buli RD	1,646	1,551	1,021
Chavar (city)	5,574	5,775	5,831
Sivan District			8,994
Alishervan RD (Note: Transferred to Badreh County after the 2016 census)			1,767
Mahmudabad RD (Note: Established after the 2016 census)			
Mish Khas RD			7,227
Jafarabad (city) (Note: Became a city after the 2016 census)			
Total	193,222	213,579	235,144
RD = Rural District

== See also ==
Media related to Ilam County at Wikimedia Commons
