= Jarqavieh County =

County in Isfahan province, Iran

Jarqavieh County Persian: شهرستان جرقویه
- County
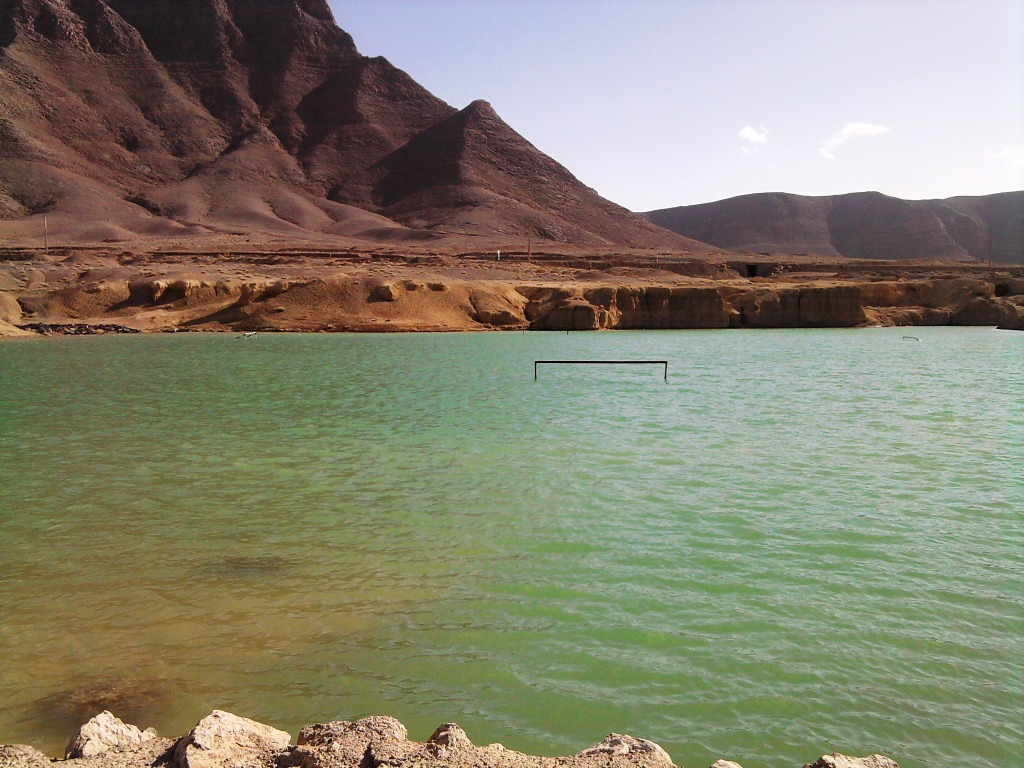
- Lake Qarneh

- Location of Jarqavieh County in Isfahan province (bottom right, pink)

- Location of Isfahan province in Iran
- Coordinates: 31°57′N 52°32′E
- Country: Iran
- Province: Isfahan
- Established: 2021
- Capital: Nikabad
- Districts: Central, Jarqavieh Olya
- Time zone: UTC+3:30 (IRST)

Jarqavieh County (Persian: شهرستان جرقویه) is in Isfahan province, Iran. Its capital is the city of Nikabad, whose population at the time of the 2016 National Census was 4,364 people in 1,442 households.

== History ==
In 2021, Jarqavieh Olya and Jarqavieh Sofla (Note: Renamed the Central District of Jarqavieh County) Districts were separated from Isfahan County in the establishment of Jarqavieh County, which was divided into two districts of two rural districts each, with Nikabad as its capital.

The Shast-Sheshi festival (or related to "sixty-six" in Persian) is held annually in the region. Beginning on the sixty-sixth day after Nowruz (the Iranian New Year), the festival corresponds in date and function to the pre-Islamic Zoroastrian feast of Khordadgan, dedicated to the divinity Khordad, the female guardian of water.

== Demographics ==
=== Administrative divisions ===
Jarqavieh County's administrative structure is shown in the following table.

Jarqavieh County
Administrative Divisions
Central District (Note: Formerly Jarqavieh District and then Jarqavieh Sofla District of Isfahan County)
Jarqavieh Sofla RD
Jarqavieh Vosta RD
Mohammadabad (city)
Nasrabad (city)
Nikabad (city)
Jarqavieh Olya District (Note: Formerly Sefidasht District)
Jarqavieh Olya RD
Ramsheh RD
Hasanabad (city)
RD = Rural District

== See also ==
Media related to Jarqavieh County at Wikimedia Commons
