= Mount Crosby Pumping Station =

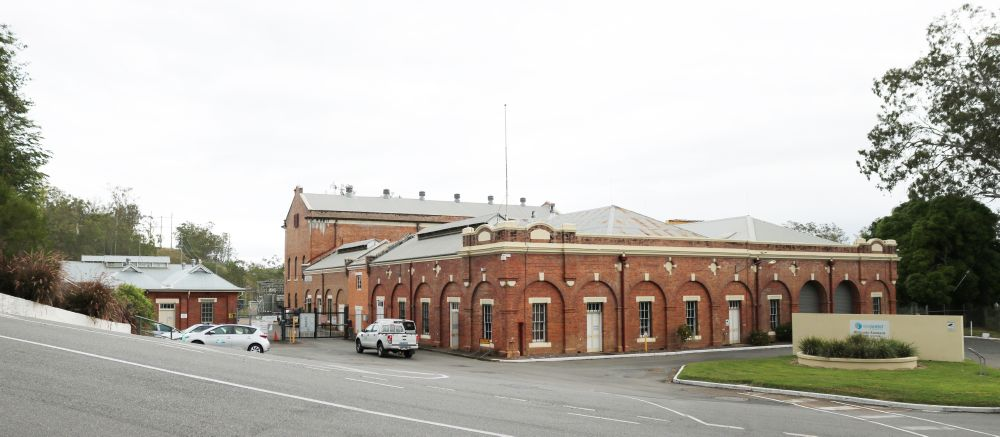
- Mount Crosby Pumping Station, from north, 2019

- Location within Queensland
- 27.5380°S 152.7991°E
- Location: Stumers Road, Mount Crosby, City of Brisbane, Queensland, Australia

History
- Design period: 1870s–1890s Late 19th century
- Built: 1891–1892, 1892–1915, former water intake, culvert, silt chamber and tunnel site (1892, 1892–1949, 1899, 1902–1918), remnant weir (1902, 1913, 1913, 1914–1926, 1915, 1926–1928, 1926, 1926, 1941)

Site notes
- Architect: Charles H McLay

Queensland Heritage Register
- Official name: Mount Crosby Pumping Station Complex
- Type: state heritage
- Designated: 25 October 2019
- Reference no.: 650236
- Type: Natural feature: River/creek/watercourse; Residential: Cottage; Residential: Detached house; Residential: Duplex; Transport-rail: Tramway; Transport-road: Bridge-road; Utilities-water supply: Weir; Utilities-water supply: Pumping station
- Theme: Exploiting, utilising and transforming the land: Exploiting natural resources; Exploiting, utilising and transforming the land: Managing water; Exploiting, utilising and transforming the land: Protecting and conserving the environment; Developing secondary and tertiary industries: Lodging people; Working: Organising workers and workplaces; Moving goods, people and information: Using rail; Moving goods, people and information: Using motor vehicles; Building settlements, towns, cities and dwellings: Establishing settlements and towns; Building settlements, towns, cities and dwellings: Developing urban services and amenities; Building settlements, towns, cities and dwellings: Dwellings; Creating social and cultural institutions: Sport and recreation

Mount Crosby pumping station is a heritage-listed pumping station and weir (the Mount Crosby Weir) at Stumers Road, Mount Crosby, City of Brisbane, Queensland, Australia. It is located on the Brisbane River and extends into Chuwar on the other side of the river. The facility supplies water to Brisbane and nearby cities and towns within the SEQ Water Grid. It was originally designed by Charles H McLay and built from 1891 to 1892. The historic parts of the facility were added to the Queensland Heritage Register on 25 October 2019. It is also listed on the Brisbane Heritage Register, together with numerous associated facilities which were not included in the state heritage listing.

The Mount Crosby pumping station was originally steam-powered. A tramway was originally created for construction purposes, but was later used to transport coal to fire the boilers to create the steam that drove the pumping engines; The facility originally pumped untreated water from the north or eastern bank of the river, but water treatment was added later.

The Mount Crosby pumping station complex has been an important part of Queensland's industrial history since first established in 1892. Several important technological phases in Queensland's history are reflected in the buildings, infrastructure, and industrial remnants. In continuous operation, the station has provided generations of workers with employment and accommodation in the adjacent worker's houses, reflecting the importance of providing accommodation to company workers in remote locations in the late 19th century. The prominent waterworks operation, incorporating daily life as place of employment, residence, and recreation, and the relatively remote location, fostered a close-knit and social community of workers and their families.

== Geography ==
The Mount Crosby pumping station complex is located 24 km southwest of Brisbane's CBD. There is a single lane bridge over the Mount Crosby Weir enabling easy access across the Brisbane River; it is a public road.

== History ==
Established in 1892 by the Brisbane Board of Waterworks as a means of providing Brisbane residents with a reliable source of clean water, the pumping station is situated alongside the Brisbane River from which the water is taken. The complex consists of the 1892 pumping station and a series of contemporaneously built workers' houses, which provided accommodation for employees. Associated infrastructure and industrial remnants throughout the site represent the pumping station's technological phases. Mount Crosby pumping station continues to provide Brisbane and its surrounds with clean, safe and reliable water.

The Mount Crosby district forms part of the traditional land of the Yuggera Ugarapul people. John Oxley first sailed up the Brisbane River in the early 1820s and named the area now known as Mount Crosby, Belle Vue. It was not until the mid-late 1850s that land at Mount Crosby began to be settled, with small farms emerging, and by the 1870s the majority of the land at Mount Crosby had been selected. Ipswich, the closest regional town, became the centre for supplies and market for the Mount Crosby farmers.

Brisbane's water supply during the convict era came from a reservoir in present-day Tank Street in the Brisbane central business district. There was no pipe network; the water was delivered by water carts to households who stored their water in barrels. The water was described as having "a pea-soup colour and consistency" which required the householders to add wood ashes or alum to their water barrels to precipitate the yellow sediments. On establishment of the Brisbane Municipal Council in 1859, one of their first tasks was to plan a better water supply for the growing town.

The Brisbane Waterworks Act 1863 was introduced to alleviate this problem. The legislation enabled the Brisbane Municipal Council to construct reservoirs, supply water to the town and to charge for services, but allowed the Queensland Government to influence decisions with the establishment of a Board of Waterworks. The Enoggera Dam was completed in 1866 and provided reticulated water to the town, and in 1871 the first of Spring Hill's Service Reservoirs the supply of water to Brisbane residents. Further improvements to the water supply were made with the construction of the Gold Creek Reservoir in the early 1880s.

As the population of Brisbane grew and the water supply became increasingly stretched following a series of droughts, the Brisbane Board of Waterworks recognised the necessity for expansion of water infrastructure. In 1880, government hydraulic engineer, JB Henderson, recommended the construction of a pumping station at Mount Crosby, and in 1889 the Board's chief engineer, Alexander Stewart, prepared plans for a new waterworks following the passing of legislation in 1889 (the Brisbane Water Supply Act 1889), when permission was granted to draw fresh water from the Brisbane River at Mount Crosby.

=== 1890–1902 ===
The new works were to be constructed on the site of a former farm, on an elevated portion of land above the river, and at the base of a high hill. A brick pumping station, installed with the latest coal-powered steam engines, would pump the water up the hill to a reservoir, where it could be stored before being gravity-fed through a large pipeline to Brisbane. It was reported in 1891 that "only about twelve months have elapsed since the first workman struck his pick into the side of the hill to form the site for the buildings, and now the completion of the works is close at hand".

The contractor awarded the construction of the pumping station was Chamberlain & Wylie, with work commencing on the 1 August 1890. The Board appointed Joseph Stewart as Chief Engineer of the works; he would serve in this position until his death in 1919. A dedication plaque was erected at the entrance to the engine house at the time of his death commemorating Stewart's service at Mount Crosby. At the commencement of the work, Queensland was experiencing high levels of unemployment and it was estimated that more than 80 men were to be employed in the waterworks' construction. As initial work progressed well, in April 1891 the ceremony of laying the foundation stone was attended by numerous dignitaries, including the Colonial Secretary, Hon. Horace Tozer MLA, and "the stone being ready, and a raised platform having been erected for those present, the stone was laid on the left hand corner at the rear of the building".

Work progressed swiftly, and by December 1892 it was reported that the main brick buildings were complete, including the tall engine house, one-storey boiler house, and a 31.6 m (104 ft) high chimney. All the bricks were locally made. There was also a timber coal shed, an office/operations room, and a timber weighbridge adjacent to the boiler house. The steam-driven pumping machinery installed in the engine house was supplied by British company, Easton and Anderson Ltd., and the boiler house boilers were supplied by JW Sutton & Co., manufactured in their works at Kangaroo Point, Brisbane.

The engine house was a tall building, aligned east/west and approximately 23 m (75 ft) long and housed the pumping machinery. Inside the building, five circular concrete-lined wet wells (A, B, C, D and E - west to east), were dug to a depth of 36 m (118 ft) into the ground from the ground floor of the engine house, each with a diameter of 2.4 m (7 ft 10 in). Within three of these wells (A, B, and C) the pumping equipment was held, with Wells D and E remaining vacant for future expansion. The pumps were "vertical, compound, tandem, direct-acting, condensing machines", and were believed to take up less floor space than other types, as the machinery was designed to work in a vertical fashion, deep into the ground and high above it in the engine house. To service the equipment within the engine house, a hand-operated traveling crane was installed, running above the wells at a high level on parallel iron rails.

The boiler house was attached to the centre of the north side of the engine house and was aligned north–south. It was a 44 m × 13.7 m (144 ft × 45 ft) structure. The eastern wall was brick and the western wall featured open arches, which provided access from the detached coal store built at the western side of the boiler house. The design of the boiler house provided space for 13 boilers, although only 8 were installed. When working, the coal-fired boilers produced the steam that powered the pumping machines within the engine house. Water, drawn from the river at an intake constructed below the station, was forced through a pipeline up the steep incline to the reservoir, initially known as the high-level reservoir, where the water was gravity fed down a series of pipelines to Brisbane.

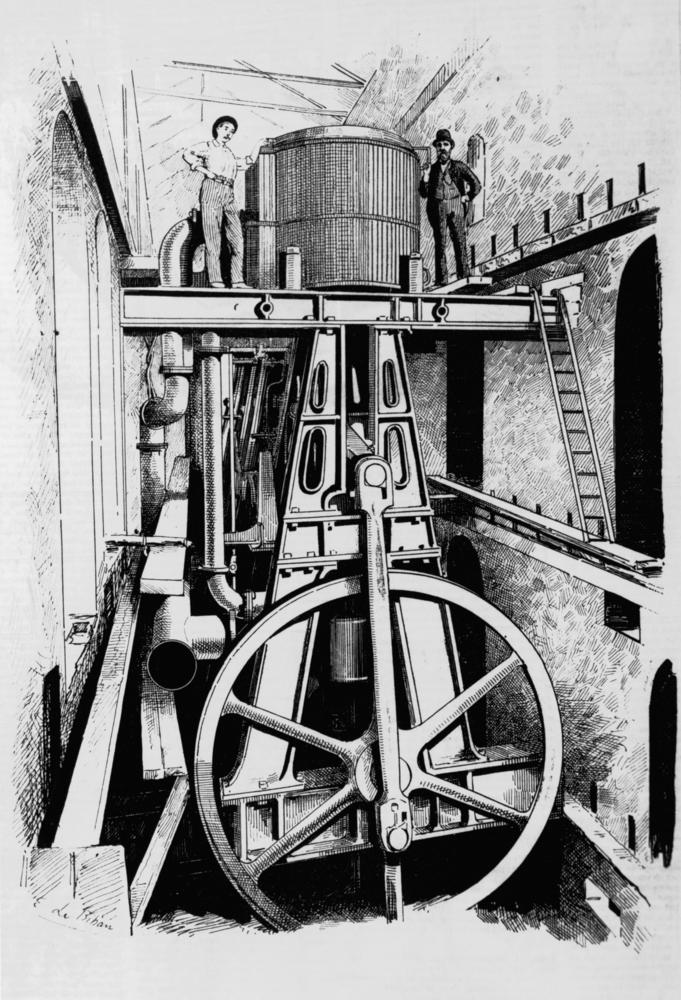
Pumping engine at the Mount Crosby waterworks, 1892

The pumping machinery, being of the latest technology, was difficult to correctly install. To assist with this, as per the contract, in 1892 Easton and Anderson sent a company representative, Charles May, to supervise the machinery's installation. May was also responsible for running the machines for six months following the start of operations. The installation of the pumping equipment did not go as smoothly as hoped. Excessive vibrations threatened to damage both the equipment and the pump house. Initially the vibrations were thought to be caused by the machinery itself, but turned out to be caused by the way the machinery had been attached to the engine house walls. Problems with the casting in one of the wells also caused damage to one of the pumps. After initial issues were quickly rectified, in June 1893 it was reported that "those dependent on the water supply at Brisbane will be glad to know that the machinery at Mount Crosby is at length working smoothly, and that a constant and reliable stream of good water is now flowing into the city from that source".

A stable means of coal delivery was crucial for the running of the station. All coal supplies came from the Tivoli coal mines, several kilometres away in North Ipswich. Initially, the coal was delivered by horse-drawn wagons, each capable of holding 3 t (3.3 short tons; 3.0 long tons) of coal. The wagons crossed the river at Colleges Crossing, approximately 2.5 km (1.6 mi) south of the pumping station. In 1893 this bridge became a casualty of the flood. The coal then had to be transported across the river in punts, a costly and inefficient venture. In December 1893 the Board of Waterworks accepted a tender from Chamberlain and Wylie for the construction of a new bridge to be built over the river at the actual station. The bridge was completed in 1894. Two years later, it was washed away by a flood, but rebuilt in 1897, only to be washed away again the following year. In 1899 a third bridge had been completed, which was thought to be flood-proof. Drays continued to deliver the coal to the station across this bridge and it was estimated that between 3000 and 5000 tonnes were taken to the station per year.

The site chosen for the pumping station was relatively remote, with only rudimentary tracks to the station from Ipswich and Brisbane. Employee housing was a major requirement for the Board of Waterworks. When work began on construction, accommodation for up to 80 men was required and tents were erected on the slopes surrounding the construction works. "Dotting the hillside at every eligible spot, lies the calico township of Mount Crosby, in the midst of which the great brick chimney stack...rears its lofty head". Temporary structures were also built for offices and a store.

Permanent housing for the pump station's employees was a component of the Board's original intent and in January 1891, respected Brisbane architect, Charles McLay, was commissioned by the Board to design eight houses. McLay, who had been responsible for the design of the Brisbane Customs House in 1889, called for tenders in January 1891, and awarded the contract to Robert Rutherford. It was not unusual in the late 19th century and into the 20th for a company to provide housing for their workers if situated in an isolated location, as Mount Crosby was.

For the workers at the Mount Crosby pumping station a substantial brick chief engineer's residence, two timber houses for the second and third engineers, four timber duplexes to house eight firemen and their families, and a small timber cottage for the drayman were constructed on a site beside the pumping station which became known as Works Hill. By December 1891, the three engineers' residences had been completed, with the chief engineer's house located on the rise at the northern side of Stumers Road (chief engineers' house was demolished in the 1970s). The other two engineer's houses were built higher up on the ridge of the hill and on the southern side of Stumers Road. One year later the remainder of the housing had been completed. Situated down the hill from the two engineers' houses, were the four fireman's duplexes, also on the south side of Stumers Road. Unusually for the time, the duplexes were not placed uniformly, facing a road, or within a grid layout, instead they followed the contours of the hill, each with a different outlook toward the pumping station or out to the high-level reservoir. The drayman's cottage, located closest to the pumping station and on the southern side of Stumers Road, was also complete by this time. In November 1892, The Telegraph reported:

Over a dozen very comfortable looking houses have been erected on the slope of the hill at the bottom of which is the pumping station. The second and third engineers occupy the first two houses on the left going towards the engine house, and the eight firemen are accommodated a little lower down the slope, the chief engineer's house, an exceedingly nice brick cottage, being near the works, but opposite to the other houses. In this way all those engaged on the works live on the spot.

The decision of the Board to construct duplexes rather than detached cottages was unusual, and may have been for economic reasons. Due to the passing of the Undue Subdivision of Land Prevention Act 1885, which legislated the size of housing allotments to prevent an increase in slum conditions, in crowded, inner-city Brisbane suburbs such as Spring Hill and Petrie Terrace, duplexes and terrace houses were rarely constructed in Queensland after 1885. As all the land on which the duplexes were built was owned by the board, allotment sizes did not need to be considered.

For such an important plant it was imperative to have the majority of staff on hand. When first complete, the pumps were worked for up to 16 hours a day in two shifts, requiring constant attendance at the station, in particular the firemen, whose job it was to stoke the boilers with coal.

The chief engineer's role was essential to the running of not only the station, but also the high-level reservoir and the main lines to Brisbane. Clear lines of communication to Waterworks' offices in the Brisbane CBD were essential. Queensland's longest telephone line at the time was installed, which ran from the engineer's house to Brisbane. As was the case with much of the station's machinery, the use of the latest technology demonstrated the importance of the station to the region.

Other municipal water pumping stations with steam-powered equipment were established in Queensland at this time, including at Rockhampton (1873), Ipswich (1878), Toowoomba (1879), Warwick (1887), Maryborough (1880) and the Burdekin River pumping station at Charters Towers (1887). All were smaller in scale than Mount Crosby, which remains the only large-scale pumping station complex remaining from this period with intact 19th century workers' housing. The majority of these sites retain only remnants of the early stations. The Maryborough pumping station at Tinana Creek still pumps water, but there is no longer any early fabric remaining on the site.

In 1893, a state school, located several hundred meters away from the pumping station, along Stumers Road, replaced a smaller 1882 provisional school, providing education to employees' children.

=== 1902–1921 ===
In the early 1900s, Queensland experienced a severe drought that caused the Mount Crosby section of the Brisbane River to become a series of waterholes and almost ceased the flow of water down the river. Chief Engineer, J Stewart, initially took steps to alleviate this by sending men upstream to dig channels to release water. Further emergency measures were taken when a sandbag and clay weir was built just below the 1892 intake. A permanent solution was approved by the board in 1902 and a 3 m (9.8 ft) high, concrete weir was constructed 700 m (2,300 ft) downstream from the original intake.

The quality of the water delivered to Brisbane was often criticised, as it was frequently turbid and odorous. These concerns were voiced by the Central Board of Health who believed the water was not fit for human consumption. Following several reports undertaken by Sydney and American hydraulic engineers and bacteriologists, it was recommended that a plant be constructed to purify the water before its distribution. In 1910, the Metropolitan Water and Sewerage Board replaced the Board of Waterworks and approved the construction of a water treatment plant on Mount Crosby. Works included the construction of two separate plants - the low-level treatment works, situated below the original 1890s high-level reservoir, and the Holt's Hill filtration plant, at a higher elevation. The high-level reservoir was then used to hold water to be used as wash-water for cleaning the filtration plant's sedimentation basins. This work had been completed by 1918.

Major improvements were also made to the pumping station at this time. Much of the equipment was deemed to be inefficient and tenders were called for its upgrading, "the proposed new pumping plant was of three units, each capable of delivering 6,000,000 gallons [27,000,000 litres] of water from the Brisbane River in 24 hours". The accepted tender (albeit the sole tender) was Victorian company, Thompson and Co., with a total cost of £107, 641 for equipment and installation. Three vertical steam engines were to replace the older three. Three wells (the original Wells C, D, and E) were converted into dry wells and widened to accommodate the new engines, reshaping them from circular to oval. One of the original wells (originally Well B) was converted into a lift well and retained. With the expansion of the wells, the engine house required extension northwards and eastwards resulting in a larger floorplate. A new 15 t (17-short-ton; 15-long-ton) hand-operated travelling crane was installed to service the expanded building and electric lighting was also installed in the engine house at this time.

Four of the original boilers were replaced with more efficient Babcock & Wilcox boilers; this required a higher roof on the boiler house. On the east side of the boiler house was built a brick economiser house, adjacent to the chimney to accommodate economiser flues, components of the new equipment. The new pumps were operational by 1916.

The inefficient coal transportation system was also rectified at this time when approval was given by the Board for the construction of a tramway from the Tivoli railway station to the Mount Crosby pumping station. The new line was to be maintained and worked by the Metropolitan Water and Sewerage Board. Work on the 7 km tramway had been completed by December 1913 at a cost of £31,000. The tramway was built to first-class railway standards. As it had been privately built, it could not officially be termed a railway line. On the west bank of the river, a 30 t (33-short-ton; 30-long-ton) capacity weighbridge and small cabin was constructed at the rise of the steep embankment. While initial intention was for the locomotives to deliver the coal directly to the pumping station, the steep embankments on both sides of the river prevented this. As an alternative, electric winches were installed on each side of the river to haul the wagons across the bridge to the station. The tramway was continuously used until 1945 when trucks replaced it.

The construction of the water treatment plant on Holt's Hill was difficult, due to Mount Crosby's steep terrain. An aerial ropeway was installed from the west bank, across the river and over the rugged hills, ultimately landing at the apex of the hill at the water treatment plant. The aerial ropeway was powered by a steam engine installed on the west bank and situated slightly further downstream from the weighbridge; the loading station was located here as well. Operational by 1915, the ropeway hauled substantial iron bins to and from the treatment plant's base, with an interim stop at the low-level reservoir. The bins were filled with gravel needed for concrete making, sand for the filtration systems and many other necessary materials, "with the delivery of the materials for a ropeway tramway passing over the hills switchback fashion, and connecting Holt's hill with the gravel pits, a system which would accelerate construction work at the purification works". The ropes were suspended by timber trestles (up to 11.5m high) or steel trestles (up to 27m high), depending on the height required. The aerial ropeway was used until 1931, when the east bank trestle was damaged by a flood.

In 1919, a hall was opened. Situated up the hill from the chief engineers' house, it became the social centre for the Mount Crosby community. Events such as balls, community meetings, church services and fundraising evenings were well-attended by the small Mount Crosby community. In 2019 the hall is used as a child-care centre.

Further work at the pumping station was carried out from 1920, with the construction of a freestanding one-storey brick building to the east of the pumping station building. The building contained an office, a generator, and workshop. It was designed to complement the brick pumping station. Administration offices, a bathroom, and large open store area were accommodated in the front section. Behind this was a generator room and adjacent condenser room, and behind this was a large machines workshop. The southern end of the building was not enclosed, providing easy access into the workshop.

=== 1922–1940 ===
In 1922, the Mount Crosby pumping station began supplying water to Ipswich. Prior to this, Ipswich had supplied its own water from a smaller pumping facility at Kholo, also on the Brisbane River, but due to Ipswich's increasing population, supply became strained.

The remainder of the original pumping equipment was removed from the engine house at this time, with another three oval dry pumping wells constructed at the western end of the engine house, requiring further expansion of the engine house another 12.5 m (41 ft) west. The original Well A was demolished but Well B, the lift, was retained. In 1925, a three-storey annexe was constructed, projecting from the rear of the engine house to house a turbo-alternator, used to generate electricity to the pumps at Lake Manchester, several kilometres away. The upper floors became electrical workshops, accessed by an external staircase.

The boiler house was extended to the north and a higher roof was added over this section; a second economiser house was built on its east side, beside the chimney, and a large coal store, accessed by tram rails that ran into the building, was added along the west side of the boiler house. These new buildings had attractive arched brick façades, unifying the different sections, and were completed by 1921.

Important work to construct a new intake was carried out in the 1920s. It was to be situated near the pumping station and 150 m (490 ft) north of the original intake. The design included the construction of a concrete tower on the eastern bank of the river that would hold the associated equipment and strainer wells. From the intake tower, a 1.8 m (5 ft 11 in) wide underground tunnel would convey the water to the station, where it was distributed to the various pumping engines. The new intake was completed by 1926 and the use of the original one ceased.

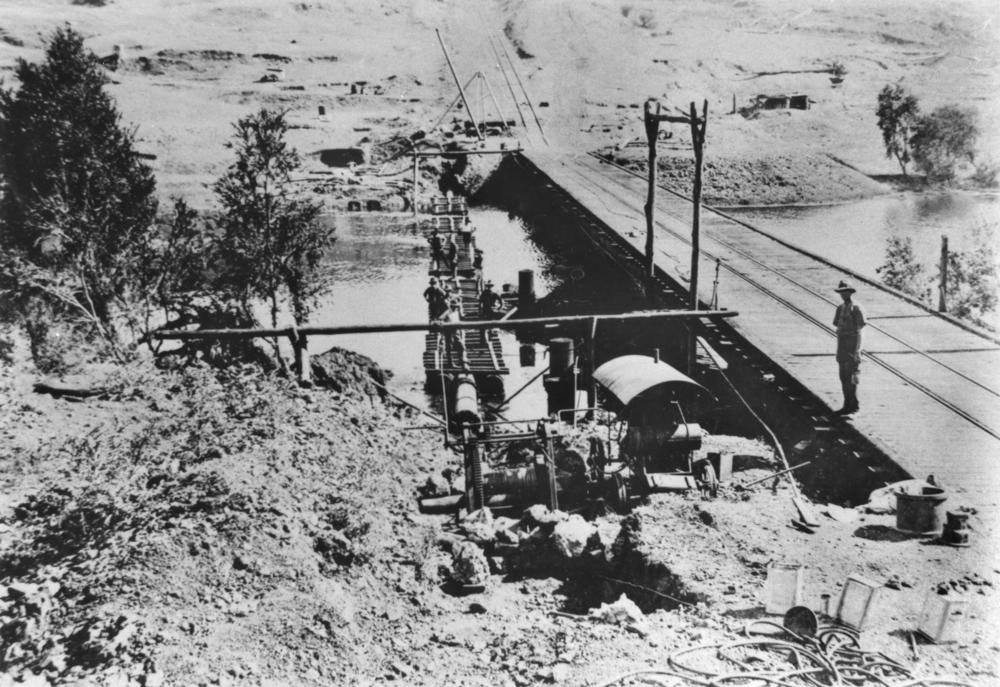
Kholo main pipeline being laid, Brisbane River at Mount Crosby, 1922

As part of these improvements, a new weir was constructed across the river between the 1899 bridge and the intake tower. The new weir incorporated a vehicle overbridge with a tramway to replace the older bridge. Electric haulage of the coal wagons was continued across the new overbridge, with the haulage winch shifted to the north on the west bank. The design of the weir allowed floodwaters to flow through concrete pillars and, theoretically, spare the overbridge from damage. Plans were approved in 1921 and the work was completed in 1925. In February 1927, major flooding damaged the new weir and all but destroyed the 1899 bridge, with one report saying "the main course of the Brisbane River has been altered by a huge washaway that carried away in the flood many thousands of tons of earth, tearing a chasm 50 yards wide and 20 feet deep at the end of the composite weir and bridge, and leaving the railway swinging in the air like a clothesline". The floodwaters gouged out a large section of the west bank leaving a 76 m (249 ft) section of tramline swinging in the air. The cost to repair the damage was considerable as the weir and overbridge required further extension and stronger footings at the west bank. This was completed in 1928.

The Brisbane City Council took over the Mount Crosby pumping station in 1928, following the dissolution of the Metropolitan Water Supply and Sewerage Board. It was then administered by the Department of Water Supply and Sewerage.

In 1938, a three-storey extension was made to the engine house annexe to house a new circular well, Well G. Two centrifugal pumps, capable of delivering 22.7 ML (800×10^{3} cu ft) litres of water per day, were installed in the well and the turbo-alternator converted to power the new engines. A small fan house to hold a centrifugal fan used to cool the engines was erected beside the extension.

=== 1940–2019 ===
An unforeseen issue arose following the completion of the weir, as mullet stock, once plentiful in the upper reaches of the Brisbane River, began to wane. The weir blocked their passage upstream, following spawning season when they had travelled downstream. Anglers on the upper reaches began to notice the depleted stock, and farmers were concerned with the higher numbers of leeches, previously controlled by the mullet as a food source, affecting the cattle. Heavily depleted mullet stock was likewise identified by the coastal fishing industry. Concern was raised by the Esk Shire Council, Kilcoy Shire Council, and Crows Nest Shire Council. In September 1940, agreement had been reached between the Brisbane City Council, Ipswich City Council, Moreton Shire Council, Esk Shire Council, Laidley Shire Council and Gatton Shire Council to contribute to half of the £250 it would cost to build a fish ladder. The remainder would be paid by the Queensland Fisheries Department.

The Brisbane City Council built the fish ladder on the east bank of the river below the weir. It consisted of a stepping series of concrete ponds over which the water cascaded. Each step held a fairly deep pool of water from which the fish would jump 23 cm into the next pool, eventually reaching the top of the ladder and gain freedom in the upper reaches of the river. At this time it was reported, "lately fish ladders have been in the local news. They are familiar things abroad, especially in America, and now the Brisbane City Council and the State Government are combining to build one at Mount Crosby Weir". Although fish ladders were not a new concept, with many being constructed in the US, Canada and New Zealand to assist salmon, the Mount Crosby fish ladder is the earliest known fish ladder in Queensland. The ladder had been completed by March 1941 and in late April the Fisheries Department reported to the Queensland Treasurer that large numbers of young mullet were using the ladder, and stocks upstream were swiftly replenishing. The base of the fish ladder was damaged in the 1980s following works on the mains.

As World War II intensified following the Japanese attack on Pearl Harbor on 7 December 1941, the threat of a Japanese attack on Queensland was viewed by the authorities as likely. Protection of southeast Queensland's foremost water supply plant was crucial, and in 1942, three anti-aircraft guns were placed strategically at high points around the station and a small military camp was set up between the pumping station and the low-level reservoir. At the same time, the water mains between Ipswich and Mount Crosby were patrolled. Windows on the northern and eastern facades of the pumping station were bricked-in. By 1943, the perceived threat had abated and all military installations removed. (Note: It is possible that mobile 40mm Bofors type anti-aircraft guns, known to be used by the 113 and 114 Light Anti Aircraft Regiments based in Brisbane, were used.)

Another era of considerable change at the station began in the late 1940s, with the plant's complete conversion to electricity. A sub-station was constructed south of the engine house through which the City Electric Light Company supplied the plant. A central control room was installed on the first floor of the engine house annexe. (Note: The Electrical Workshop was moved to a separate building.) From the control room a door was cut into the engine house wall, and a steel mezzanine deck was built, on which a switchroom was installed. This deck extended almost the entire length of the engine house, 7.3m above the ground floor (later removed). All the steam-powered pumping equipment was removed in stages and replaced with more efficient, electricity-driven equipment. The boilers were also removed at this time. New pumping equipment was installed, each with the capacity to hold two pumps, rather than only one steam-driven pump, as was the case prior to electrification. Each pump was capable of pumping 49 ML (1.7×10^{6} cu ft) of water each day. With well G also in operation, the pumping station had the capacity to pump 365 ML (12.9×10^{6} cu ft) per day. The plant was fully electrified by 1951 at a cost of £287,000, with the Queensland Government contributing £57,400 and Brisbane City Council covering the remainder.

The official opening ceremony was held on the 30 March 1951, and was attended by dignitaries including the Queensland Premier, Ned Hanlon, and Brisbane Lord Mayor, John Beals Chandler. Prior to electrification, each shift at the station had required 20 men, but with the new technology, only two men were needed. The control room became the centre for the plant and was described at the time:

Here, on a large curved desk top, the whole installation is represented diagrammatically, the electrical supply system and the motors and pumps and valves, and in this diagram miniature switches are incorporated. These switches control the whole of the operation, and from this point the operator can start and stop pumps or operate as he wills. Coloured lights, green, yellow and red, tell a constant story of the plant operation, so the operator standing at this desk knows exactly what is happening in all parts of the station.

In 1953, the generator room and condenser room, located in the 1920s building, were refitted as an electrical workshop. With the new capacity, a new intake was constructed in 1957, beside the 1920s intake tower. In 1958, the towering brick chimney was demolished and the resultant space in the façade bricked up to make a storeroom. In 1959, a 4 tonne electric crane was added to the existing rails of the earlier hand operated crane (which was retained). Photographs from this period show the tram tracks had been removed from around the pumping station grounds, with coal not needed after electrification, but the tracks remained in situ on the 1926–1928 overbridge.

Further enhancements were made to the station during the 1960s and 1970s, including the installation of pumps in Wells E and F. A second switchroom was built under the roof of the southern half of the former boiler house. In 1975 work began on a new well, Well H, resulting in the southern half of the former coal store being demolished and a new brick enclosure constructed in its place. By 1963, the pumping station was providing 682,000 people with clean water.

From the late 1950s to the 1970s extensive landscaping and garden improvements were carried out. In the 1970s, the ornamental front fountain was installed. A stepped retaining wall facing the river was also constructed at this time, and a disused pumping station building from Lake Manchester was re-erected on the southern hill above the station. The 15 tonne crane in the engine house was relocated to this building. Since the 1970s, few alterations to the station's fabric have been made. In 2019, Mount Crosby pumping station continues to provide Brisbane and its surrounds with clean and safe water. The Mount Crosby community plays a continuing role in the promotion of their history, with an active historical society and participation in annual events such as Brisbane Open House and the "Back to Mount Crosby" days.

To cater for increased demand the Westbank Water Treatment Plant was built in 1986.

During January 2013 Eastern Australia floods, both treatment plants were unable to process Brisbane River water because it was too muddy and filled with silt.

== Current operation ==
Most of the water treated is sourced from Lake Wivenhoe and Lockyer Creek via the Brisbane River, though some is also from Lake Manchester.

There are two intakes pipes, one on each bank. The pipes are protected by a 25 millimetres (0.98 in) mesh screen which stops material such as leaves and sticks from entering the plant. The water from the Pumping Station is supplied to the Eastbank Water Treatment Plant. An additional smaller pumping station sits on the west bank to supply the Westbank Water Treatment Plant. Treated water from both Water Treatment Plants is pumped to two 90 megalitres (3.2×10^{6} cu ft) reservoirs at Cameron's Hill.

Westbank Water Treatment Plant is able to generate 250 megalitres (8.8×10^{6} cu ft) of drinking water each day.

Eastbank Water Treatment Plant is able to generate 850 megalitres (30×10^{6} cu ft) of drinking water each day.

== Description of the heritage features ==
Mount Crosby pumping station complex occupies approximately 10 hectares of land in the two outer suburbs of Mount Crosby and Chuwar, either side of the Brisbane River, 24 km southwest of the Brisbane CBD. The complex is organised into separate but adjacent connected zones that reflect the historical operations and key phases of technological development that have formed the place.

=== Process-driven layout ===
Freight, including coal to fuel the steam-powered pumping station, was transported from the west, initially carted overland (1892) then via a locomotive tramway (1913), with an electric winch tram (1914) used for the steep approaches to the river crossings (1899 bridge remnants, 1926–1928 weir overbridge) that accessed the pumping station (1892) on the east bank. A branch line on the west bank curved south to a loading station for the aerial ropeway (1915) that spanned the river to convey construction materials to the treatment plant to the northeast.

The flow of the river was managed by weirs (1902 south, 1926–1928 north), and water from intakes (1892 south, 1926 north) on the east bank was pumped through to the pumping station wells, then north in underground mains (1892, 1914, 1923, 1948) to the reservoir and subsequent treatment plant. Within the pumping station, the engine room contained a row of water pumps set above the deep wells, initially powered by coal-fired boilers housed in the adjacent boiler house, and subsequently expanded and upgraded, including phased electrification (1938–1951). A dedicated workforce to maintain and operate the Pumping station resided on elevated "Works Hill" to the east, with access to the pumping station via a private road.

The features protected by the heritage listing can be grouped into four zones:

- Westbank (Chuwar) – the former resources supply area
- Brisbane River – the source of water supply and the crossing
- Eastbank (Mount Crosby) – operations and workers' residential area
- Views

=== Westbank ===
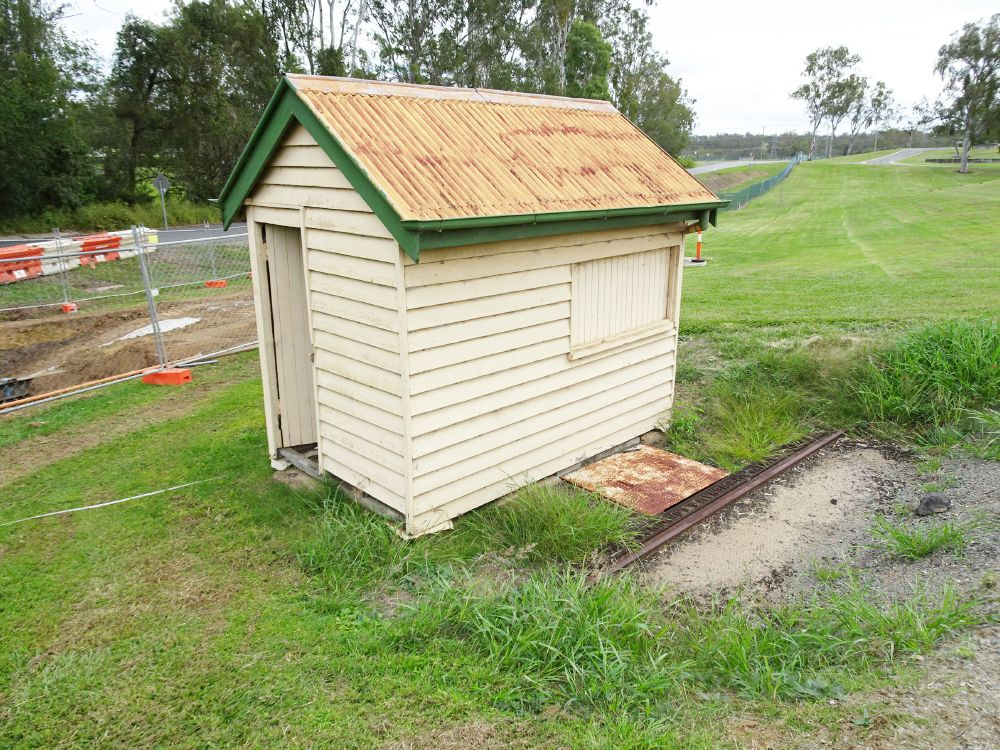
Tram weighbridge and cabin, Westbank (Chuwar), 2019

Occupying a large pocket of land on the west side of the Brisbane River in Chuwar, the Westbank zone retains features and areas of archaeological potential from its historical use as the resources receiving and supply area for the waterworks. A later large water treatment plant has been built on much of the land (not of heritage significance). It includes:

- tramway weighbridge and cabin (both 1913)
- two electric winch tram house sites (1914 and 1926)
- remnant freight tram branch line formation (c. 1913)
- remnant aerial ropeway loading station site (1915) and route

=== Brisbane River ===
The Brisbane River is approximately 150m wide at this location and this zone retains features from its use as the water supply for the waterworks.

=== Eastbank ===
Occupying a large, steeply-sloping area of land on the east side of the Brisbane River in the locality of Mount Crosby, the Eastbank zone retains features and areas of archaeological potential from its use as the waterworks pumping operation centre (pumping station) and workers' residential area.

The pumping station stands on a large, flattened terrace adjacent to the river. The workers' residential area is immediately east of the pumping station, on higher land (Works Hill) overlooking the station and the river. A private road winds its way from the overbridge, past the pumping station, up Works Hill through the residential area to meet Stumers Road, which continues past the remainder of the residences to the main centre of Mount Crosby, 400m east. The steam-powered pumping station was expanded and upgraded over time, responding to the increased demands on the water supply and as new technology became available, including the transition to electrification (1939–51).

The pump house (1892–1949) is a large masonry building standing at the front of the site, addressing the bridge road to the north. It has many attached parts to its form, which expresses the original functions of the parts. The attached parts comprise: a coal store on the west side; a central boiler house; two economiser houses on the east side (flanking the location of the former chimney, demolished 1958); and a tall engine house on the building's south end with a perpendicular tall engine house annexe projecting from the rear. A face brick wall (1921) of arches wraps the front and east side (coal store, boiler house, and economiser house), providing a robust and attractive, unified facade. This wall retains original metal downpipes, and square-headed windows and doors with timber-framed double-hung, multi-paned sashes and timber-framed boarded French doors with fanlights.

The forecourt was the former coal receiving area. It is a large, flat and open front forecourt space (which was progressively extended north and west by earthworks from 1892).

The coal store (1921) is a single-storey building with a hipped roof clad with metal sheets. The building's southern half has been demolished and replaced with a concrete frame and face brick structure for Well H.

The boiler house (1892, extended to the north 1921) is ttached to and opening from the eastern side of the coal store, the boiler house is a single-storey building with a hipped roof clad with corrugated metal sheets. A large concrete-framed and concrete block enclosure for Switch Room No.2 has been inserted under the roof of the southern half of the building.

Economiser houses (southern house, 1914; northern house, 1921) are two similar single-storey buildings attached to the side of the boiler house, which they serviced. They are separated from each other by a later storeroom (1958), which was built in place of the large demolished chimney they fed into.

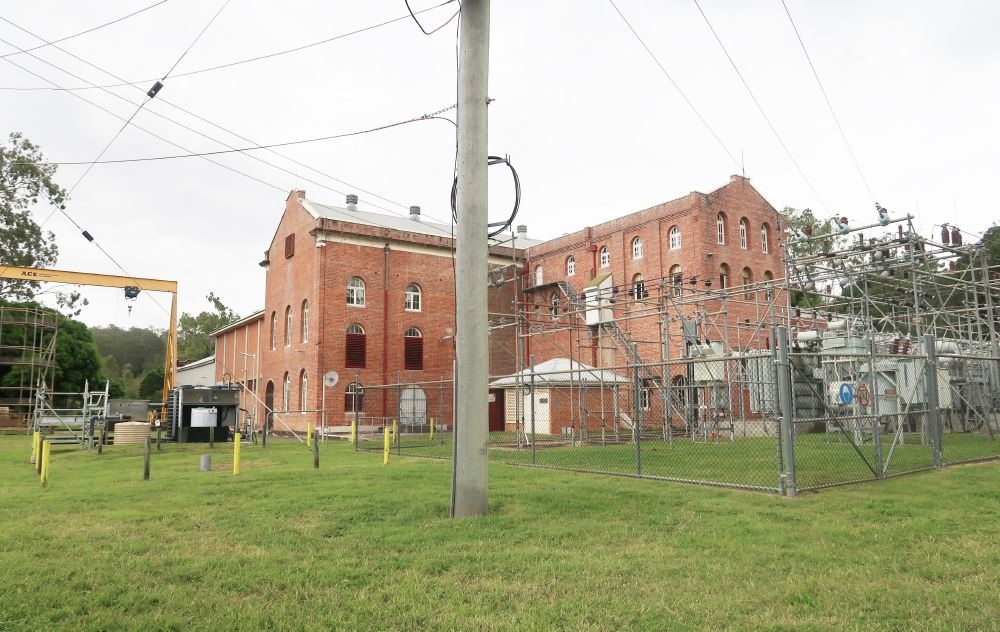
Engine House, from southwest, 2019

The engine house (1892, extended 1913 and 1925) is a tall narrow rectangular face brick building attached to the south end of the coal store, boiler house, and south economiser house. It has a gable roof clad with corrugated metal sheets. The engine house annexe (1926, extended 1941) is a three-level building, projecting from the rear (south) wall of the engine house. On the ground floor, it accommodates a switch room and Well G (in a part basement level), an internal stair up to a first floor former central control room, and an external stair from here to a second floor former electrical workshop.

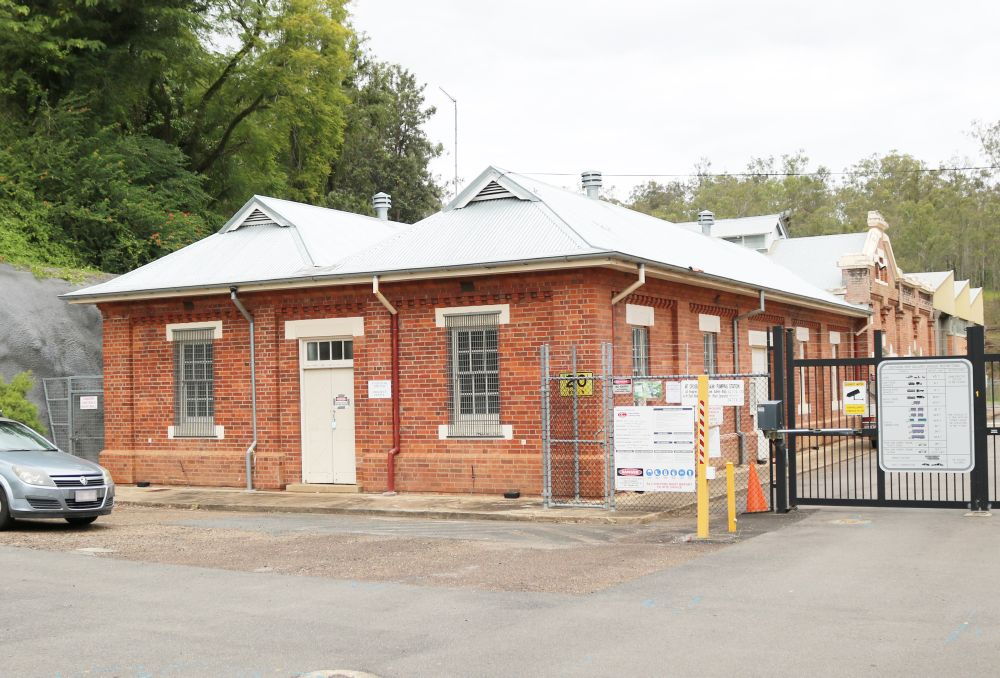
Office, Generator, and Workshop Building, 2019

The office, generator, and workshop building (1921) is a single storey face brick building standing back from the front of the site. It stands on the east side of the pump house, separated from it by a service road. It comprises three attached sections: a front (north) section accommodating offices with a large storeroom behind; a former Generator Room and Condenser Room (now one space) attached to the rear of storeroom; and a Machine Workshop attached to the rear of the generator and condenser rooms.

Well G Fan House (1941) is a small, square, single-storey, face brick building on a concrete slab. It is freestanding to the west of the engine house annexe, which houses Well G.

The electrical substation (1948) is a fenced array of external electrical infrastructure standing south of the engine room annexe. The features of the electrical wubstation of state-level cultural heritage significance are those constructed in the 1940s.

A service lane runs south from the front forecourt between the pumping station building and the office, generator, and workshop building. It is a wide clear lane to provide ample access into these buildings for large industrial equipment.

Remnant machinery, equipment, fixtures, and fittings are located in the pumping station building and its grounds. Those associated with the pumping station, tramway, and ropeway from 1892 to 1949 are included in the heritage listing, even if they are not located within a heritage-listed building.

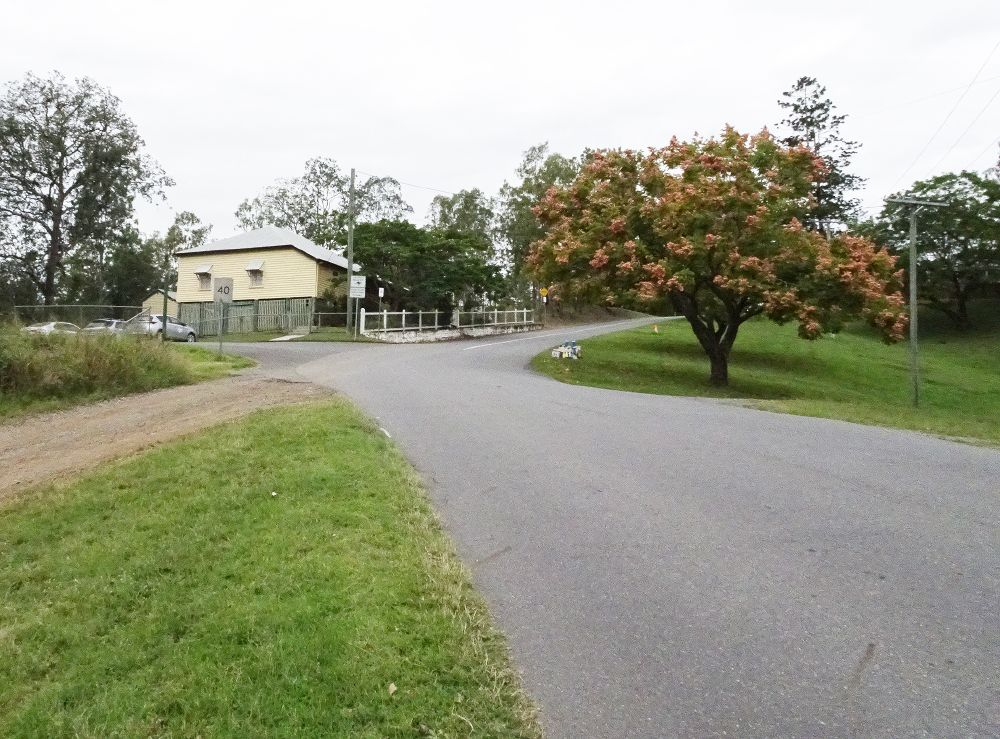
Works Hill looking toward the Community Hall with the Recreation Area on the right hand side, 2019

Works Hill is the steep terrain immediately east of the pumping station. The residences stand on a ridgeline on the south side of the private road down to the pumping station. From lowest (west) to highest (east), these are:

- the Drayman's Cottage
- the four Fireman's Duplexes
- the Third Engineer's House
- the Second Engineer's House

The Drayman's Cottage and the Fireman's Duplexes are similar in appearance and size but the engineer's houses are grander in appearance and larger.

A row of mature fig trees (Ficus spp.) stand on the steeply sloping land behind (south) of the duplex (103 & 104), bordering a narrow service road on the pumping station land and shielding the houses from the station.

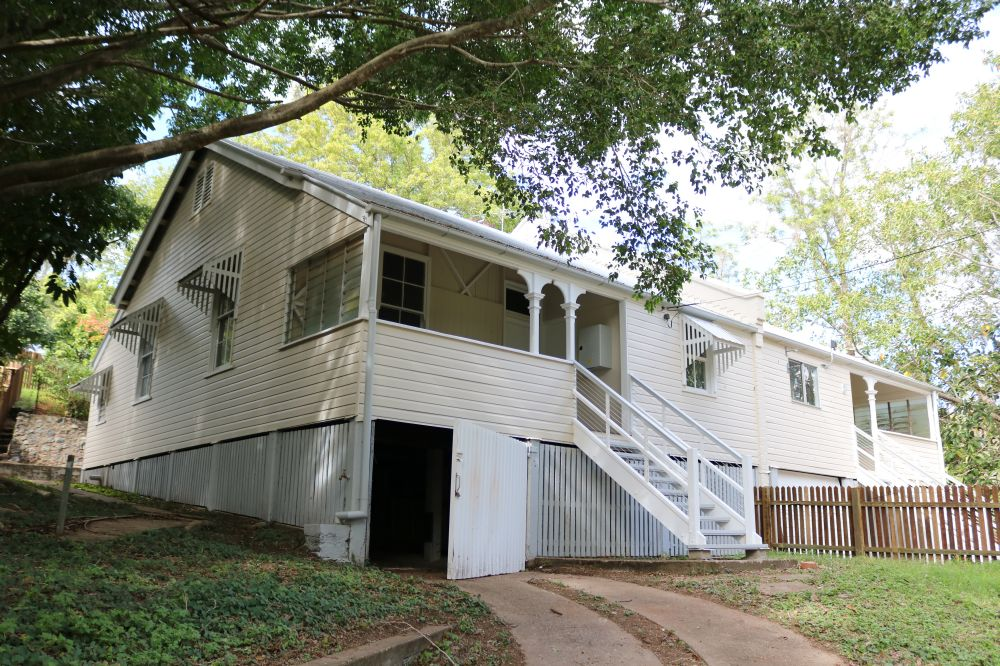
Fireman's Duplex, No. 105 and 106, 2019

The Drayman's Cottage is a small, timber-framed and -clad, single storey, two-bedroom freestanding residence with a hip roof. Originally identical, the four Fireman's Duplexes (103 & 104, 105 & 106, 107 & 108, and 109 & 110) are small, timber-framed, single storey, two-bedroom semi-detached residences (with the exception of residence 104, which has a later (pre-c. 1925) third bedroom projecting from the rear). They have gable roofs and each pair shares a brick party wall. Standing in modest yards and elevated on posts, the duplexes and the cottage have a similar four-room core and front and rear verandahs and the understoreys are mostly open with earth floors. The roofs are continuous over the verandahs and are clad with corrugated metal sheets.

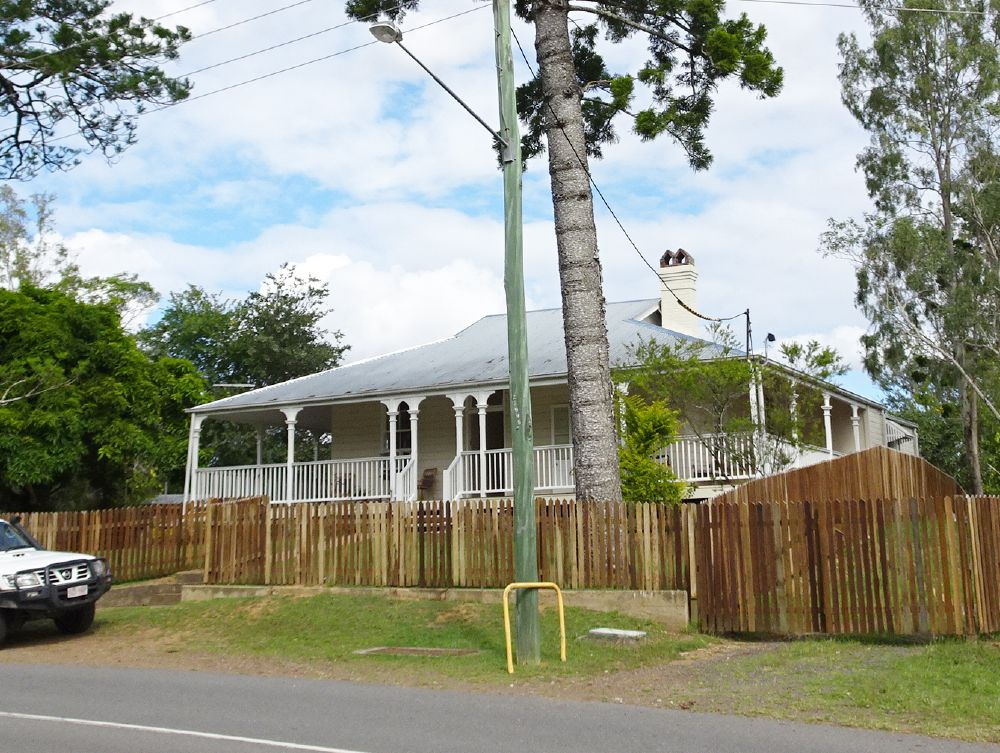
Second Engineer's House, 2019

Originally identical, the Third Engineer's House (111) and Second Engineer's House (112) are generous, single storey, timber-framed and -clad, two-bedroom freestanding residences. Elevated on posts, the houses have wide verandahs wrapping all sides. An attached kitchen projects from the rear. The understoreys are mostly open with earth floors. The roofs are continuous over the verandahs and are clad with corrugated metal sheets.

The recreation area is a sloping open area of land is approximately 3500m2 in the core of the Works Hill houses. Occupying part of Stumers Road road reserve, it is an irregular shape defined by the fences of the house yards and the road edge. It is grassed and has trees dotted across it forming an attractive setting. On the western corner of the area is a mature hoop pine. The recreation area has potential sub-surface artefacts and features from the brief but intensive "day labour" workforce, which camped on-site while constructing the pumping station.

The community hall stands on the north side of Stumers Road, highly visible from and central to the Works Hill houses.

=== Views ===
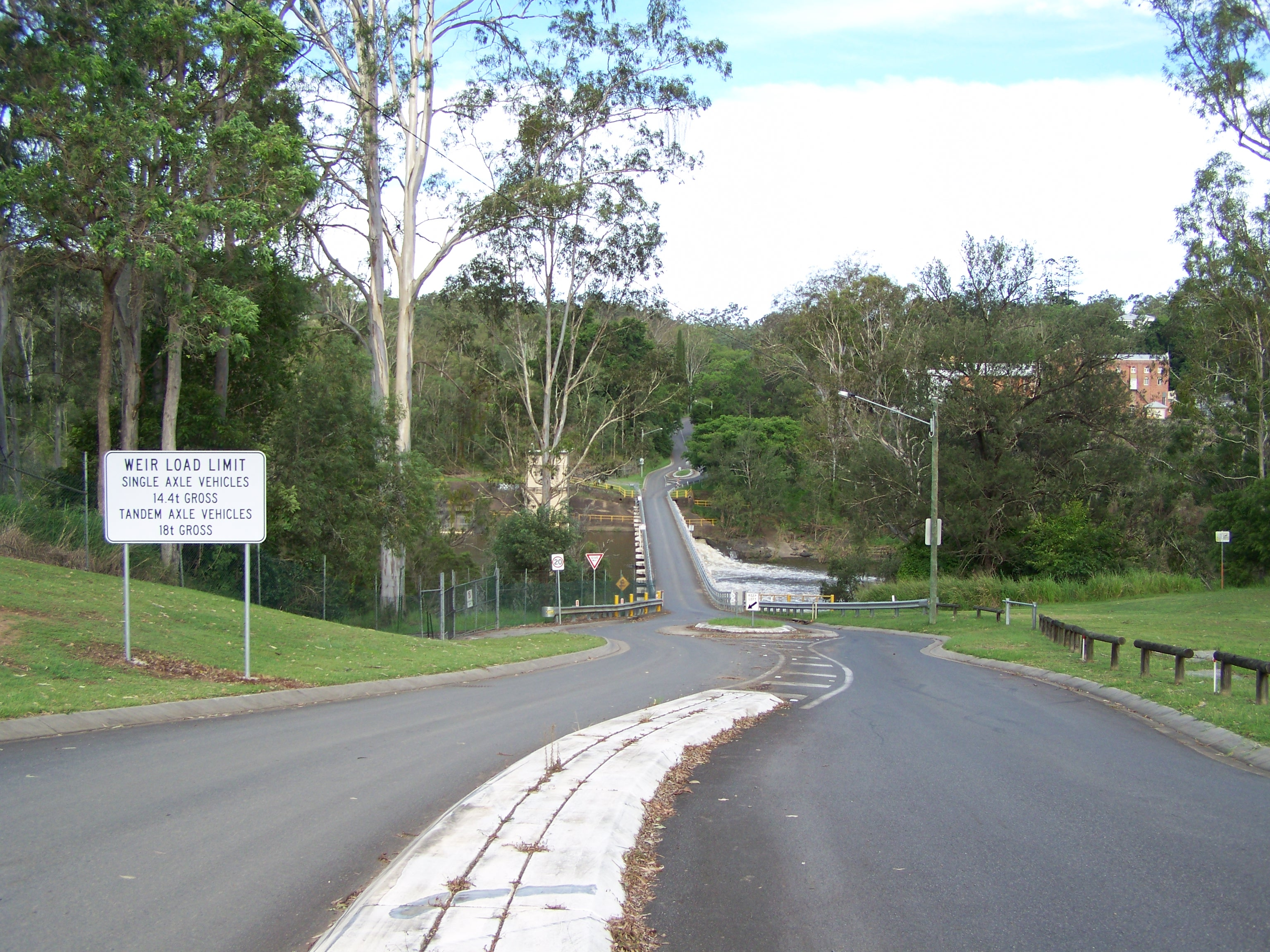
Mt. Crosby Weir, western approach

The views that form part of the heritage listing are:

- the attractive, panoramic view of the river, treed landscape, and waterworks buildings and related structures from the western approach of the 1926–28 overbridge
- the open view of the Brisbane River and 1926–28 weir from the western grounds of the pumping station complex
- the scenic views that unfold along the bridge road on the eastern side of the river of the narrow road, treed grass verges on both sides, pumping station complex, treed and grassed common, extensive rock walls and landscaped gardens, and the buildings and yards of Works Hill, which creates a "village" character. Views along the road display the collection of small, consistent timber buildings contrasting with the massive, masonry pumping station buildings in the rural riverside setting.

== Heritage listing ==
Mount Crosby pumping station complex was listed on the Queensland Heritage Register on 25 October 2019 having satisfied the following criteria.

The place is important in demonstrating the evolution or pattern of Queensland's history.

Mount Crosby pumping station complex, established in 1892, is important in demonstrating the substantial infrastructure built to supply water to Brisbane. Through its alterations and expansions over time that increased and improved water supply, it is important in demonstrating the changes in water pumping technology in Queensland, from steam in the late-19th century, to electric in the mid-20th century.

The place retains diverse layers of waterworks features from many periods, both remnant and operational, illustrating the long and continuous operation of the waterworks on the site.

The highly intact collection of workers' houses built by the Brisbane Board of Waterworks in 1891–92 adjacent to its waterworks, are an important example of late-19th century workers' housing in Queensland. The houses demonstrate the need to have a dedicated workforce available to consistently maintain and operate the historically remote steam-powered pumping station. The range of dwelling types reflects the hierarchy of employment positions, from the small drayman's cottage and four fireman's duplexes (1892), to the two large elevated engineers' houses (1891).

The fish ladder at Mount Crosby, built in 1941 using funds provided by six local councils and the State Fisheries Department, was a combined government effort to save wild mullet. It is important in demonstrating a coordinated government response to ensure the longevity of a native species essential to the state's commercial fishing industry in south east Queensland.

The place demonstrates rare, uncommon or endangered aspects of Queensland's cultural heritage.

Mount Crosby pumping station Complex is rare as the only known remaining example in Queensland of a pumping station complex established in the 19th century with intact 1891–1892 workers' housing, making this an exceptional example of its type.

The complex with its diverse layers of waterworks features from many periods is rare and retains a high level of integrity.

The place has potential to yield information that will contribute to an understanding of Queensland's history.

The extensive Mount Crosby pumping station Complex has the potential to reveal further information about late 19th and early 20th century waterworks infrastructure and operations, the transition from steam to electric power, and the people who lived and worked there.

Detailed analysis of the pumping station – its layered building fabric and associated fixtures and equipment – has the potential to address research questions relating to early and evolving waterworks technology, layout, construction, materials and operation. Broader analysis of the associated weirs, intakes and rising mains, including archaeological investigations to determine the location, design and construction of the original intake and tunnel, has the potential to contribute to a greater understanding of early and evolving water management systems for large-scale water supply.

Archaeological investigations of the remnant tramway, winch tram and aerial ropeway infrastructure, including surface and sub-surface features, has the potential to contribute to a greater understanding of the layout and operation of transportation systems associated with historically remote steam-powered waterworks.

The collection of workers residences may facilitate detailed studies relating to the proximity of industrial and domestic life, and social dynamics of the community in the late 19th century. Analysis of the layout, design and fabric of the residences and associated landscape features could address research questions relating to: the rationale behind the hierarchical siting of dwellings; and how the unusual use of duplexes may have reflected operational conditions.

Archaeological investigations of the Recreation Area have the potential to reveal sub-surface artefacts and features that might inform on the living conditions of the brief but intensive "day labour" workforce, which camped on-site while constructing the pumping station, including addressing research questions relating to consumption activities, the presence of women and children, and the layout and nature of dwellings.

The place is important in demonstrating the principal characteristics of a particular class of cultural places.

Highly intact and with a high degree of integrity, Mount Crosby pumping station Complex is exceptional as an extensive Queensland public waterworks facility from the late-19th century with extensions and alterations to the mid-20th century for increased and improved water supply. It is important in demonstrating the principal characteristics of its type through its: waterside location; weirs (1902–1918 and 1926–1928) and water intake (1926); pumping station (1892–1949); associated waterworks resources supply infrastructure, including coal tram cabin and weighbridge (1913), tracks (1913 and 1926–1928), and remnant tramway embankments, cuttings, and aerial ropeway loading station (1915); and, at isolated sites of the type, waterworks-provided worker's houses (1891–1892) and social facilities (Community Hall, 1919).

The pumping station is important as an exceptional example of a 19th-century pumping station in Queensland with incremental changes reflecting the advancements in water pumping technology over 50 years. It is important in demonstrating the principal characteristics of its type through its: wells (1891, 1913, 1924, and 1941); engine house and annexe (1892–1941); boiler house (1891–1921); coal store (1921); economiser houses (1914 and 1921); offices, generator, and workshop building (1921); and additions and alterations to accommodate electrification (1948–1949).

The place is important because of its aesthetic significance.

Mount Crosby pumping station Complex is a landmark central to the area's identity, with the substantial industrial pumping station, weirs, bridge foundations juxtaposed against the otherwise vegetated riverbank vista from the west bank.

The place displays views unfolding along the winding, narrow private road, which connects the significant features. It provides shifting views to: the collection of matching, small timber houses and their yards; the hall; the large grassed and treed Recreation Area; the terraced gardens of Works Hill; the substantial pumping station with its attractive face brick facade and open, flat setting; and the waterworks structures built in and next to the Brisbane River – the intake tower, 1926–1928 weir and overbridge, 1899 bridge remnants, and 1941 fish ladder.

The place has a strong or special association with a particular community or cultural group for social, cultural or spiritual reasons.

Established in 1892, Mount Crosby pumping station Complex has a strong association with past and present workers and their families, some of whom have generational links with the place. The once-remote site provided employment, housing, and recreation for the small community since the 1890s, and as such has played an important role in their lives. This continues to be demonstrated with events such as the "back to Mount Crosby" day, held annually, and other events held by the Mount Crosby Historical Society.

== See also ==
- SEQ Water Grid
- List of tramways in Queensland
