= Tivoli, Queensland =

Tivoli Ipswich, Queensland
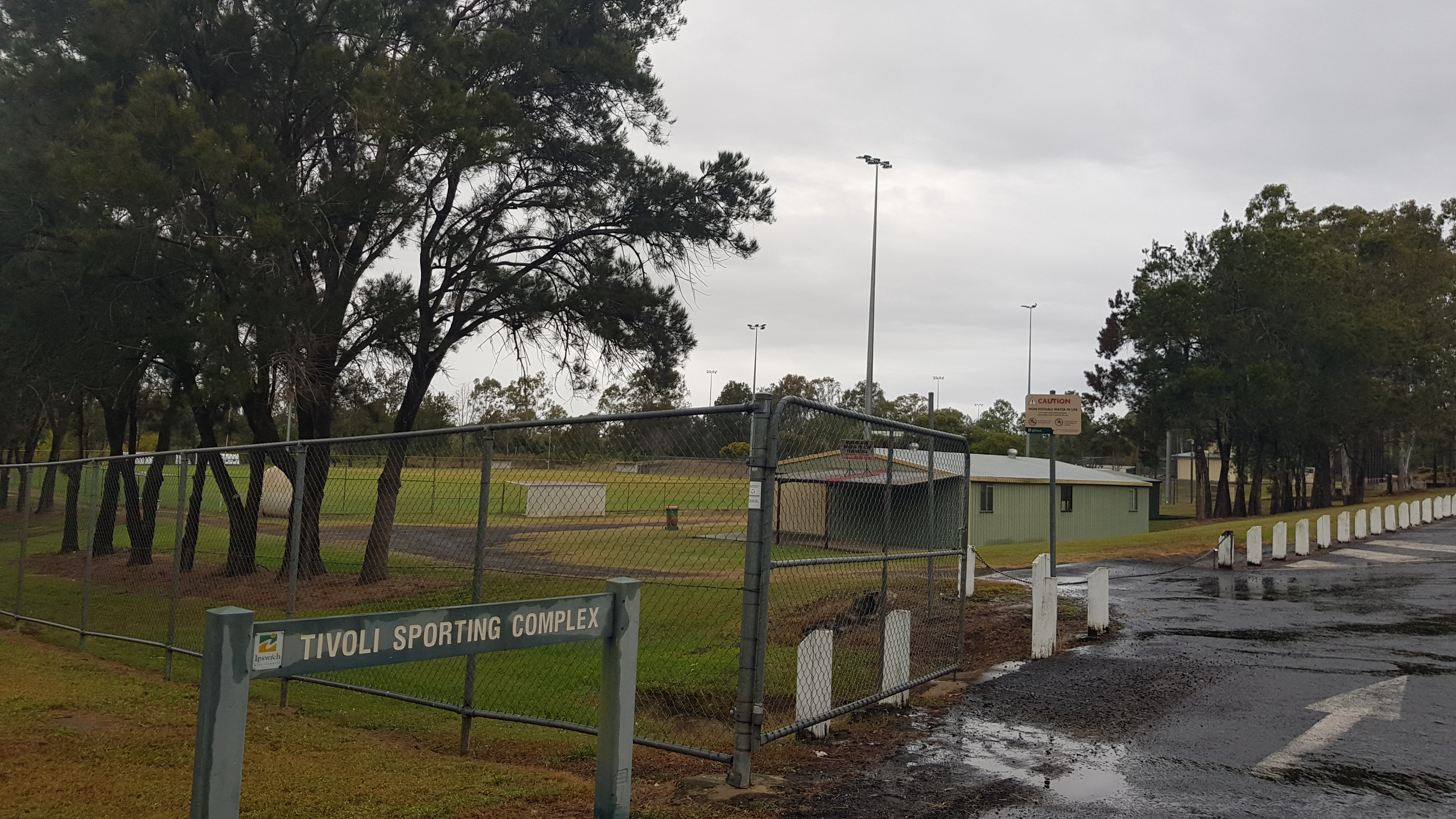
- Tivoli Sporting Complex, 2023

- Coordinates: 27.5863°S 152.7747°E
- Population: 1,460 (2021 census)
  - Density: 406/km^{2} (1,050/sq mi)
- Postcode(s): 4305
- Area: 3.6 km^{2} (1.4 sq mi)
- Time zone: AEST (UTC+10:00)
- Location: 4.8 km (3 mi) NNE of Ipswich CBD; 37 km (23 mi) WSW of Brisbane
- LGA(s): City of Ipswich
- State electorate(s): Ipswich West
- Federal division(s): Blair
Suburbs around Tivoli:
North Ipswich	Chuwar	North Tivoli
North Ipswich	Tivoli	North Booval
Basin Pocket	Moores Pocket	North Booval

Tivoli is a suburb in the City of Ipswich, Queensland, Australia. In the 2021 census, Tivoli had a population of 1,460 people.

Tivoli is home to one of six remaining drive-in cinemas in Queensland.

== Geography ==
The Warrego Highway passes from east (North Tivoli) to west (North Ipswich) through the north of the locality. Mount Crosby Road runs through from southwest to northeast.

Tivoli Hill is a neighbourhood with the suburb (27.5941°S 152.7677°E). Prior to 1991 it was a separate suburb. The neighbourhood is near the hill of the same name(27.5933°S 152.7713°E).

Situated north of the Bremer River, Tivoli is 4.8 kilometres (3.0 mi) by road north-east of the Ipswich CBD and north-east of the North Ipswich railway workshops.

== History ==
The Tivoli area had been subdivided and sold as farmland in 1861–63, and the observant purchasers went in for coal mining.

Harry Hooper and his partner John Robinson called their mine, and one of the coal seams on it, the Tivoli, and the locality took its name from the mine.

Houses and communities formed around the irregular subdivisions and mining areas.

On 9 September 1873 a Congregational church opened near the Tivoli mine . The church at 42 Church Street (27.5824°S 152.7780°E) has had continuous use. It is currently the Tivoli Christian Reformed Church.

The church hall was used as a school room for children and adults (night classes) from 1 July 1875. It had over 100 pupils by 1877 and opened as Tivoli Provisional School on 26 Jan 1877. On 17 January 1881 it became Tivoli State School. In 1937 it was renamed Tivoli Lower State School but in 1977 was renamed Tivoli State School again.

Whilst many houses were built for workmen, mine owners built close to their work sites. Next to the school in Mount Crosby Road the family of John Wright, proprietor of the Eclipse mine, built three houses on large allotments. The grandest, Oaklands is the central one; all have spacious gardens and are listed on the Queensland Heritage Register.

On the other side of Mount Crosby Road, the Abermain Colliery (1880s) was a large operation with a spur line from the Tivoli railway line and several coke ovens.

In another direction, a tramway was opened from the Tivoli mines to the pumping station at the Mount Crosby weir, transporting coal from 1913 until about 1932.

After lying idle for several years the Abermain Colliery was used for sewerage treatment. It adjoins a sports complex and the Ipswich Caravan Village. A short distance south there is the Abermain electricity substation which was enlarged in 2009.

Financed and named by John Robinson (Ipswich soda-water manufacturer) and Harry Hooper, it seems that Tivoli was a Hooper family name.

== Demographics ==
In the 2016 census, Tivoli had a population of 1,487 people.

In the 2021 census, Tivoli had a population of 1,460 people.

== Heritage listings ==
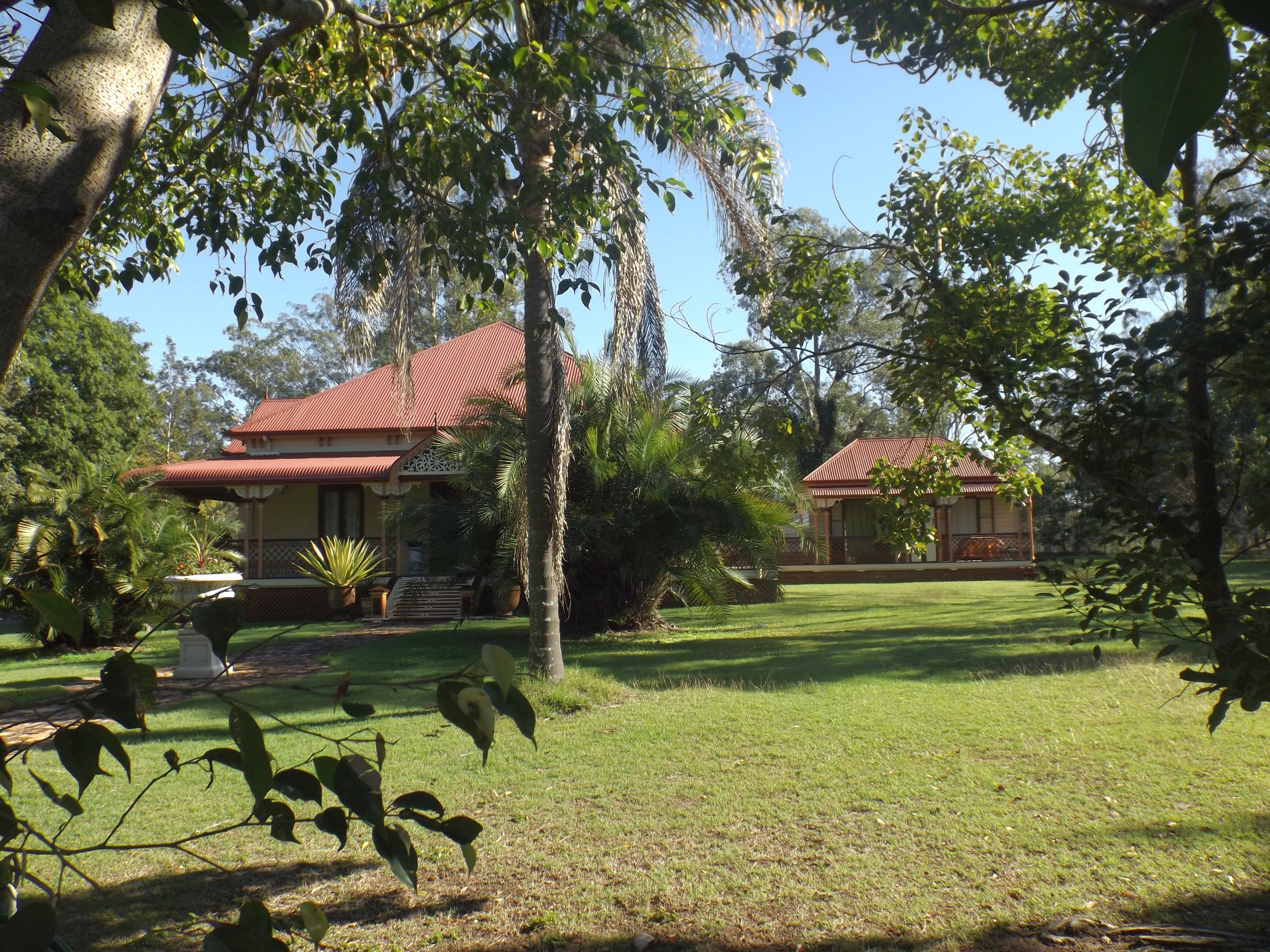
98 Mt Crosby Road is part of the Wright Family Houses

Tivoli has a number of heritage-listed sites, including:

- 98/100/106 Mount Crosby Road: Wright Family Houses

== Education ==
Tivoli State School is a government primary (Prep-6) school for boys and girls at 108 Mount Crosby Road (27.5839°S 152.7775°E). In 2018, the school had an enrolment of 133 students with 13 teachers (11 full-time equivalent) and 12 non-teaching staff (6 full-time equivalent).

There are no secondary schoolss in Tivoli. The nearest secondary school is Ipswich State High School in Brassall to the west.
