= Wright Family Houses =

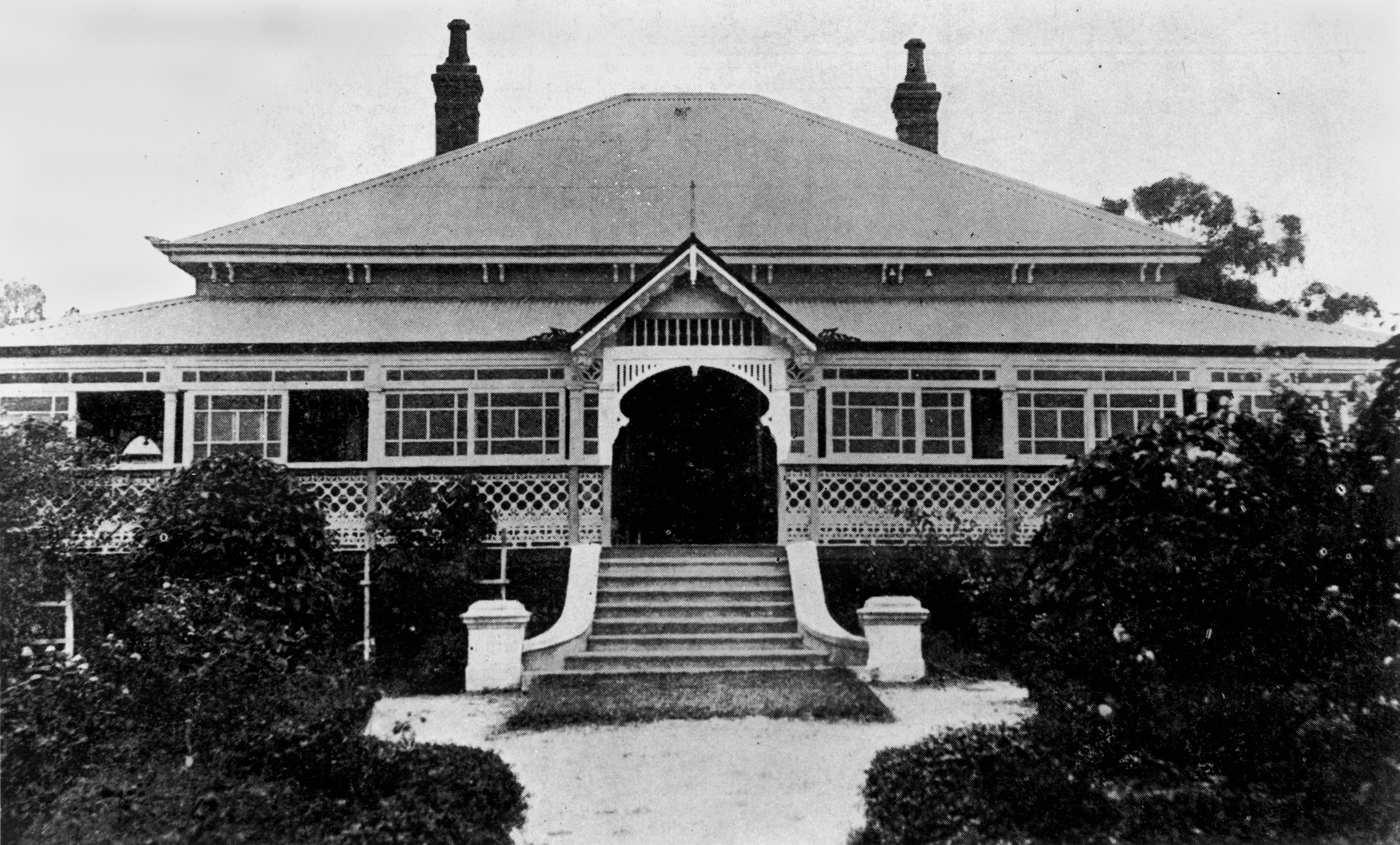
- Oaklands, 1919

- Location within Queensland Location within Australia
- 27.5845°S 152.7756°E
- Location: 98/100/106 Mt Crosby Road, Tivoli, City of Ipswich, Queensland, Australia

History
- Design period: 1870s - 1890s (late 19th century)
- Built: c. 1898 -
- Built for: John and Elizabeth Wright

Queensland Heritage Register
- Official name: Wright Family Houses, Oaklands (100 Mt Crosby Road)
- Type: state heritage (landscape, built)
- Designated: 30 January 2004
- Reference no.: 601898
- Significant period: 1890s-1910s (fabric, historical)
- Significant components: office/administration building, kitchen/kitchen house, garden/grounds, garden edging/balustrades/planter boxes, trees/plantings, residential accommodation - main house, garden - layout, pathway/walkway

The Wright Family Houses area heritage-listed group of detached houses at 98/100/106 Mt Crosby Road, Tivoli, City of Ipswich, Queensland, Australia. It was built from c. 1898 onwards. No. 100 is also known as Oaklands and No. 106 is also known as Wrightlands. It was added to the Queensland Heritage Register on 30 January 2004.

== History ==
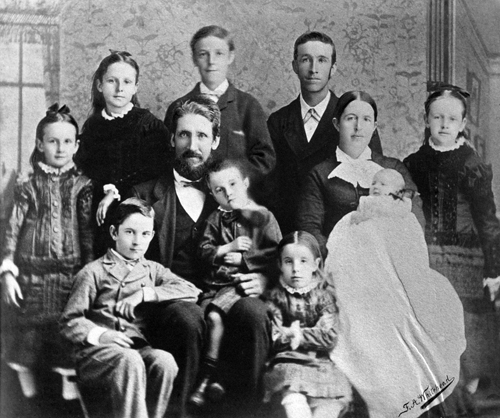
Wright family photo, 1883

The Wright family houses precinct at 98, 100 and 106 Mt Crosby Road, Tivoli, are 3 timber houses on adjoining allotments built c. 1898-1903 for John and Elizabeth Wright.

The allotments on which these residences are situated were originally a part of the land purchased in 1864 as Portion 66, parish of Chuwar, County of Stanley (43 acres), by Josiah Bowring Sloman, part proprietor of the Queensland Times. The land appears to have remained unimproved during the 30 years of Sloman's ownership and by the mid-1890s it had been subdivided.

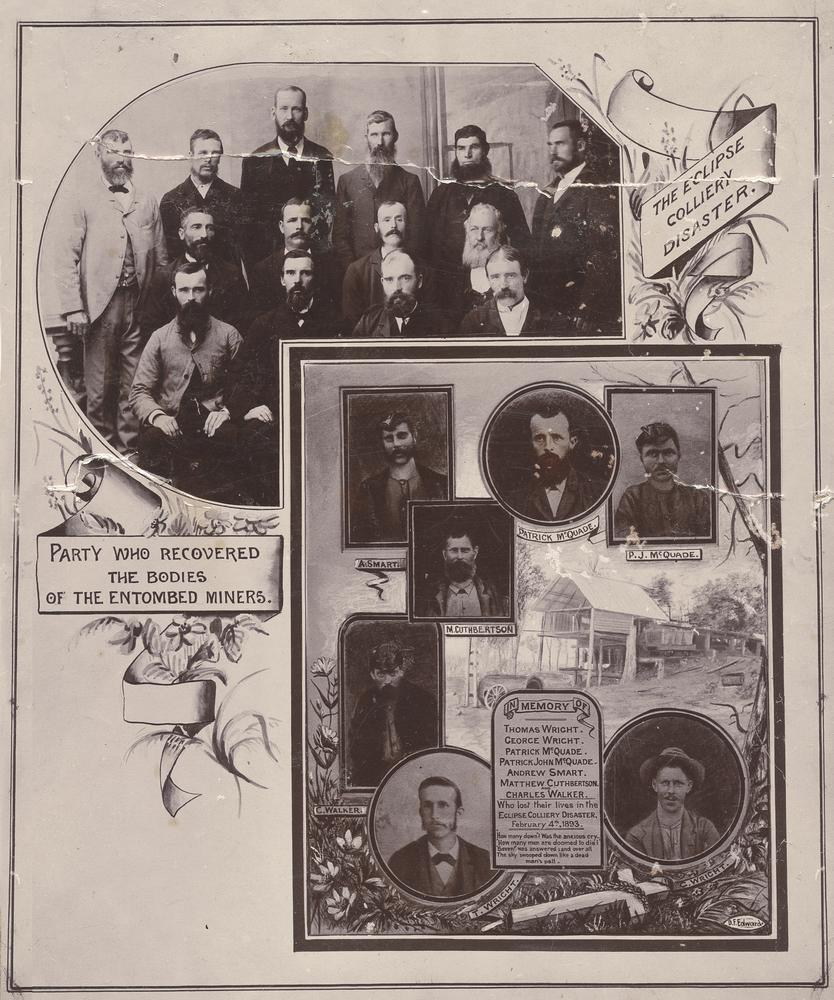
Memorial photograph from the Eclipse Colliery Disaster, Ipswich, 1893

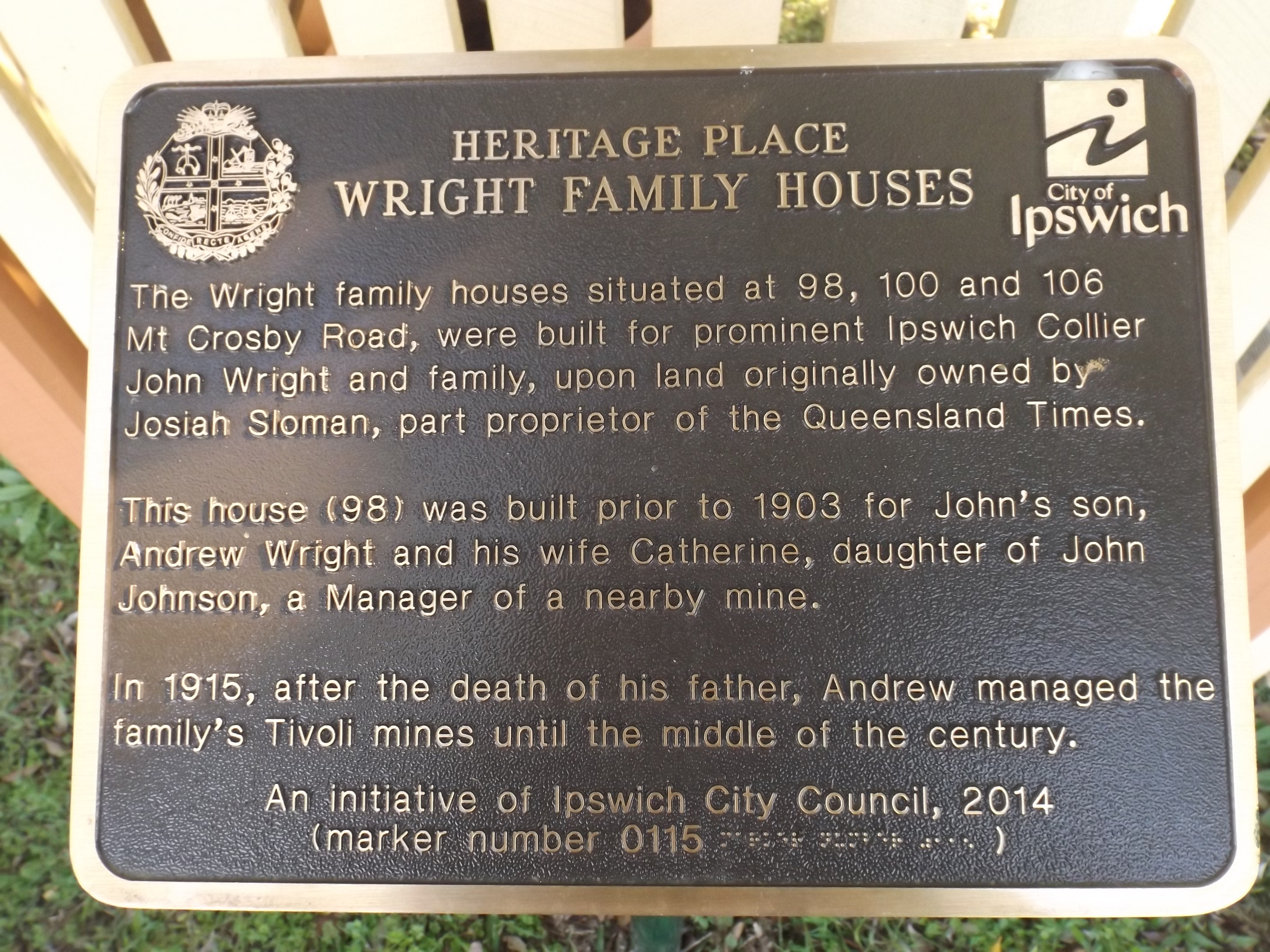
Ipswich City Council plaque, 2015

In September 1894, the title to the subdivisions on which the houses at 98 and 106 Mt Crosby Road now stand was transferred to Elizabeth Ann Wright, the wife of John Wright. Five years later Elizabeth was registered as the owner of the allotment where the main family house, known as Oaklands, was constructed and which is now delineated as 100 Mt Crosby Road. John Wright was born in 1837 at Coolbawm, County Kilkenny, Ireland, and married Elizabeth in 1862. He and his wife arrived in Moreton Bay on board the Naval Reserve in 1867 and in October of that year he moved to Ipswich to find work, while his wife and children remained in Brisbane. In the 1860s, Ipswich was an emerging centre of commercial and industrial activity and, despite the financial crisis of this period, it remained a place of opportunity for early pioneers. Coal mining was a burgeoning industry in the district at this time and Wright was from a long line of colliery owners in Ireland and had worked for several years in his father's mine before embarking for Australia This experience secured him a job at the Old Tivoli Pit owned by Harry Hooper and John Robinson, where he remained until 1873. In that year he negotiated a lease with Josiah Sloman, who then owned Portions 65 and 66, for mining rights on the land and with the financial backing of John Blond, a Brisbane coal dealer, he opened a small mine known as Perseverance Mine. Wright's mining interests continued to expand over the years with the opening of the Eclipse mine in Tivoli as well as mines in other coal-bearing districts like Purga, Walloon, Burrum and Oakey. While the Eclipse mine was lost in the 1893 floods, along with 2 of John's sons, the family business remained strong and his youngest sons, Andrew and John, later became mine managers. The Wrights became the largest producer of coke in Queensland and in 1910 the Jubilee History of Ipswich reported that the Wrights held contracts with the Mt Crosby Pumping Station, the Ipswich Pumping Station, Queensland Woollen Company, Electric Light Company of Toowoomba and Queensland Railway.

Although John Wright's mining interests were spread over Queensland, he resided in Tivoli until his death in 1915 and acquired a distinct local patriotism. While described in The History of Queensland (1919) as a "man of quiet disposition, reserved, and unassuming", he was known to have supported many local charities and with his wife helped found a Sunday school in the area. The Wrights also became prominent freehold landowners in the North Ipswich district, with Brassall Shire Council Valuation Registers showing the family owned several estates by the early 1900s. Despite their numerous real estate interests, the Wrights favoured the allotments on Mt Crosby Road (formerly known as Tivoli Road and Junction Road) for their family homes. No documentary evidence exists to definitively date the main family residence at 100 Mt Crosby Road, however it is known to have been existence by January 1898 when it was described in The Queenslander as "one of the nattiest villas in North Ipswich". The adjoining properties at 98 and 106 Mt Crosby Road reputedly were built for Andrew Wright and John Wright junior probably by 1903, the year of the earliest extant Brassall Shire Council Valuation Register, which records that on the land now covered by 98, 100 and 106 Mt Crosby Road there existed 3 residences owned by Elizabeth Ann Wright.

The juxtaposition of these properties is as much a physical representation of the rising social and financial fortunes offered to Ipswich colliers of the late nineteenth and early twentieth centuries, as it is a reminder of the concept of the extended family and a way of life no longer common. The Wrights were a close-knit family and their houses were a nest of domesticity. Elizabeth Ann Wright retained ownership of the land on which Oaklands stands until her death in 1920, after which the house was reputedly left vacant until 1922 when Elizabeth Ann Barbet, the youngest daughter of John and Elizabeth Wright, became the registered owner. Four years later the property passed to Benjamin Morgan, a close friend of the Wright family whose father had reputedly built a hut of chaff bags in a gully below Oaklands. The estate remains in the Morgan family. The property at 98 Mt Crosby Road remained in the hands of Elizabeth Ann Wright until 1915 when the title was transferred to Andrew Wright. In 1931, Catherine Wright, the wife of Andrew, became the owner of the estate and retained the title until 1953. Since that time the property has passed to a number of different owners.

The house now known as Wrightson, at 106 Mt Crosby Road, was owned by Elizabeth Ann Wright until 1911 when the title to the property was transferred to John Wright junior. After his father's death in 1915, John Wright reputedly moved to the Darling Downs to manage the family's mining interests in the region but Wrightson remained his property until 1924 when title to the estate was transferred to Robert Hutchins Hunter. Since that time the property has passed had 5 owners. The house has been renovated in recent years.

== Description ==
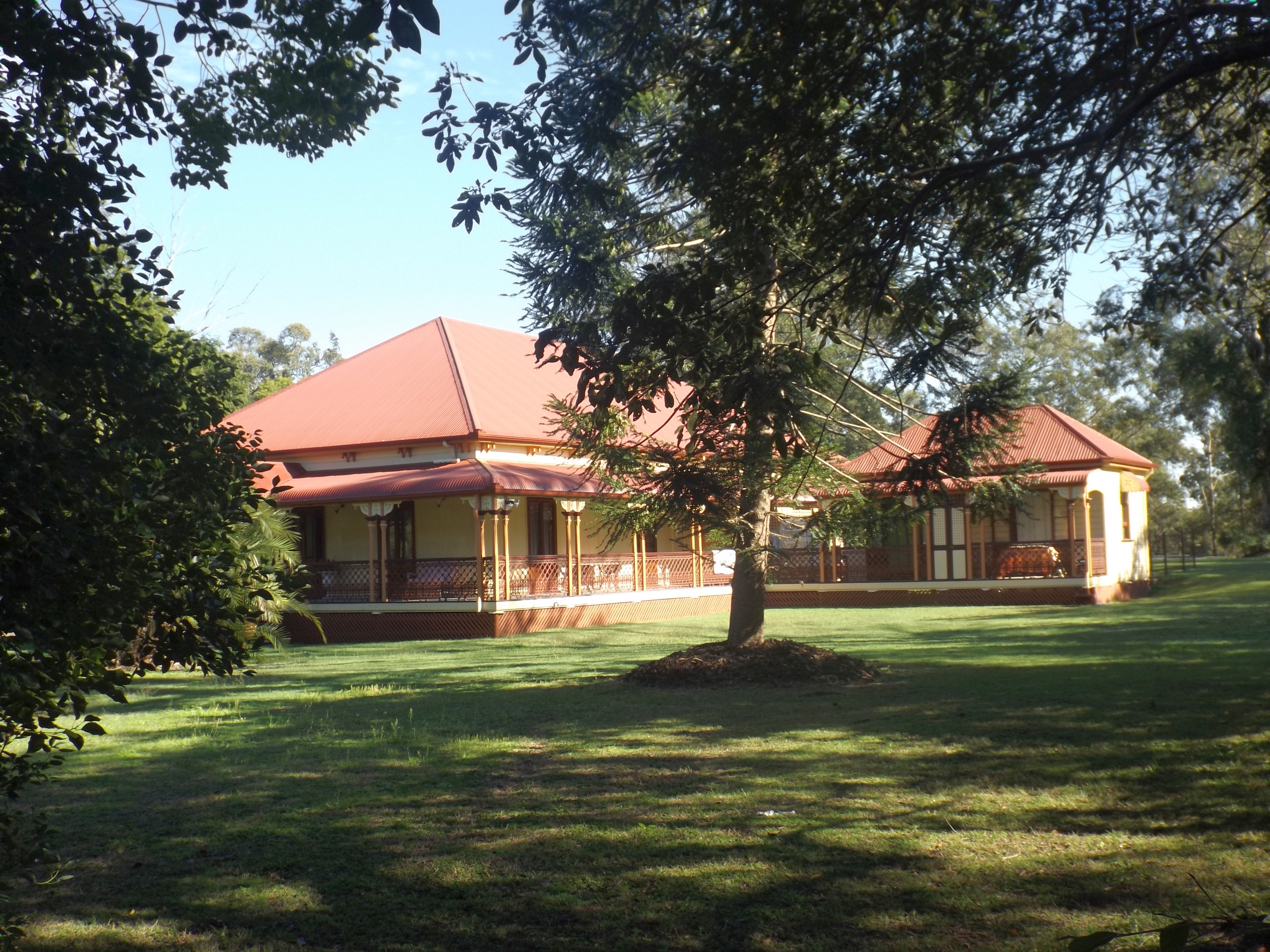
98 Mt Crosby Road, 2015

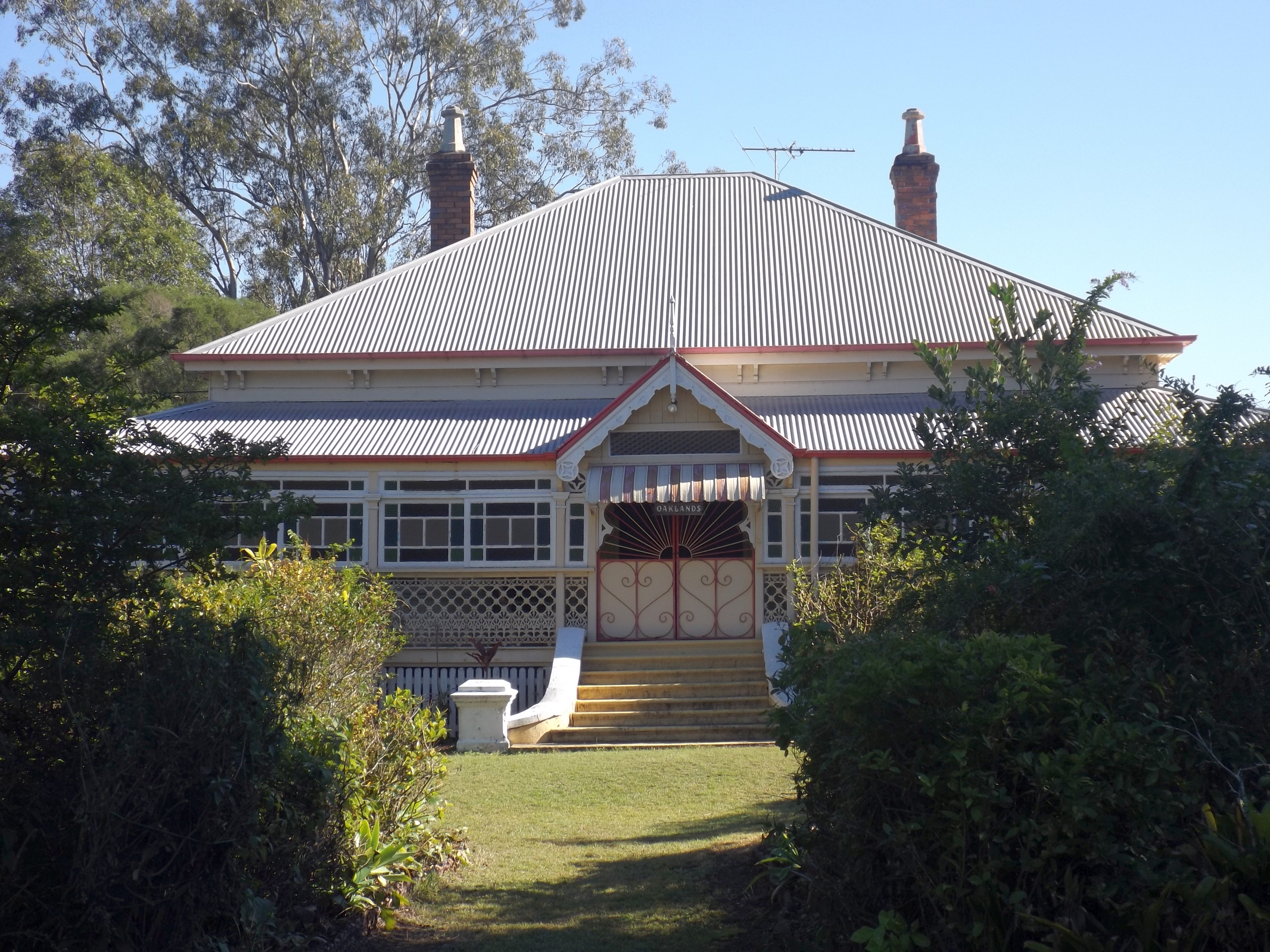
Oaklands, 2015

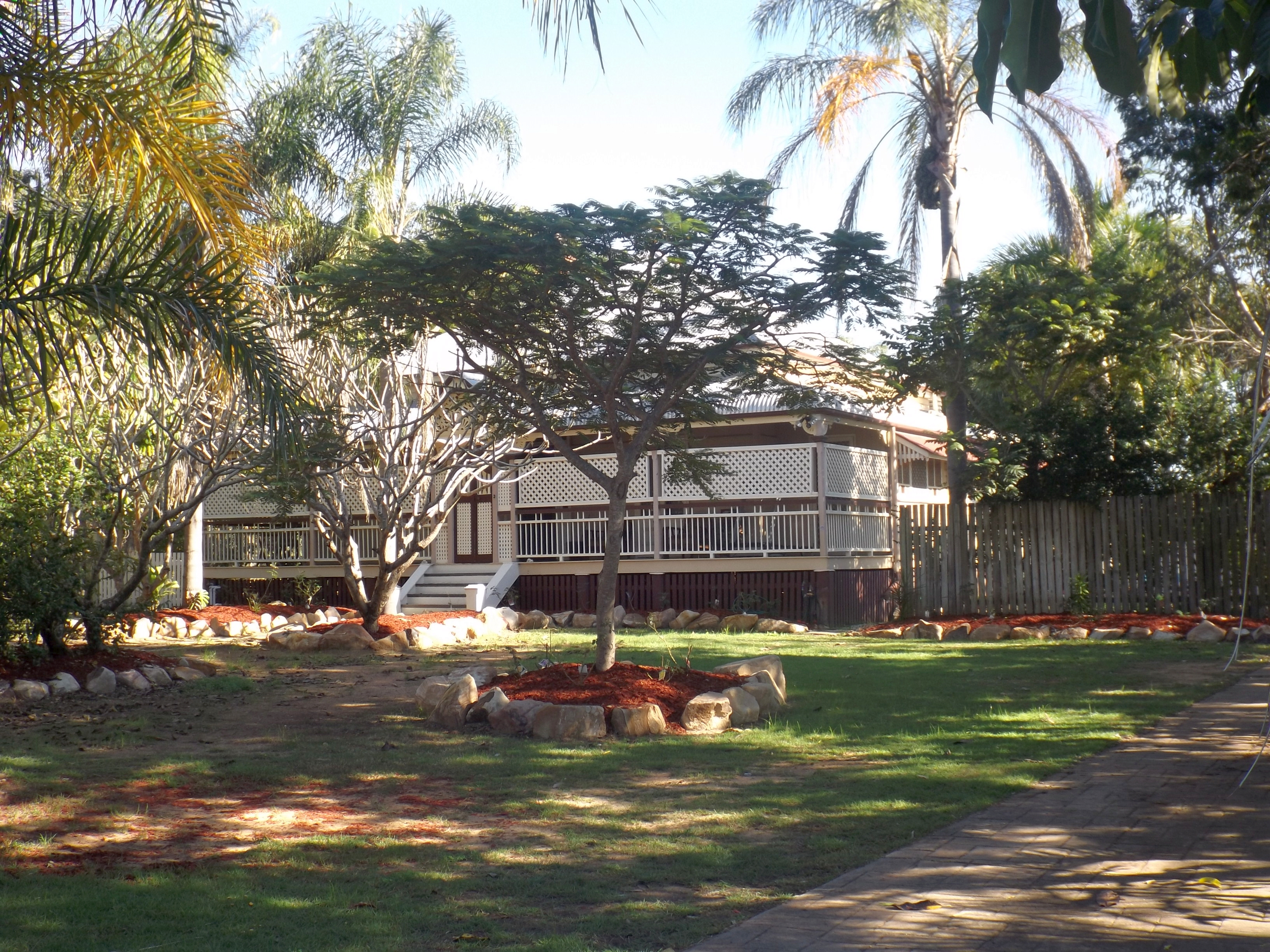
Wrightlands, 2015

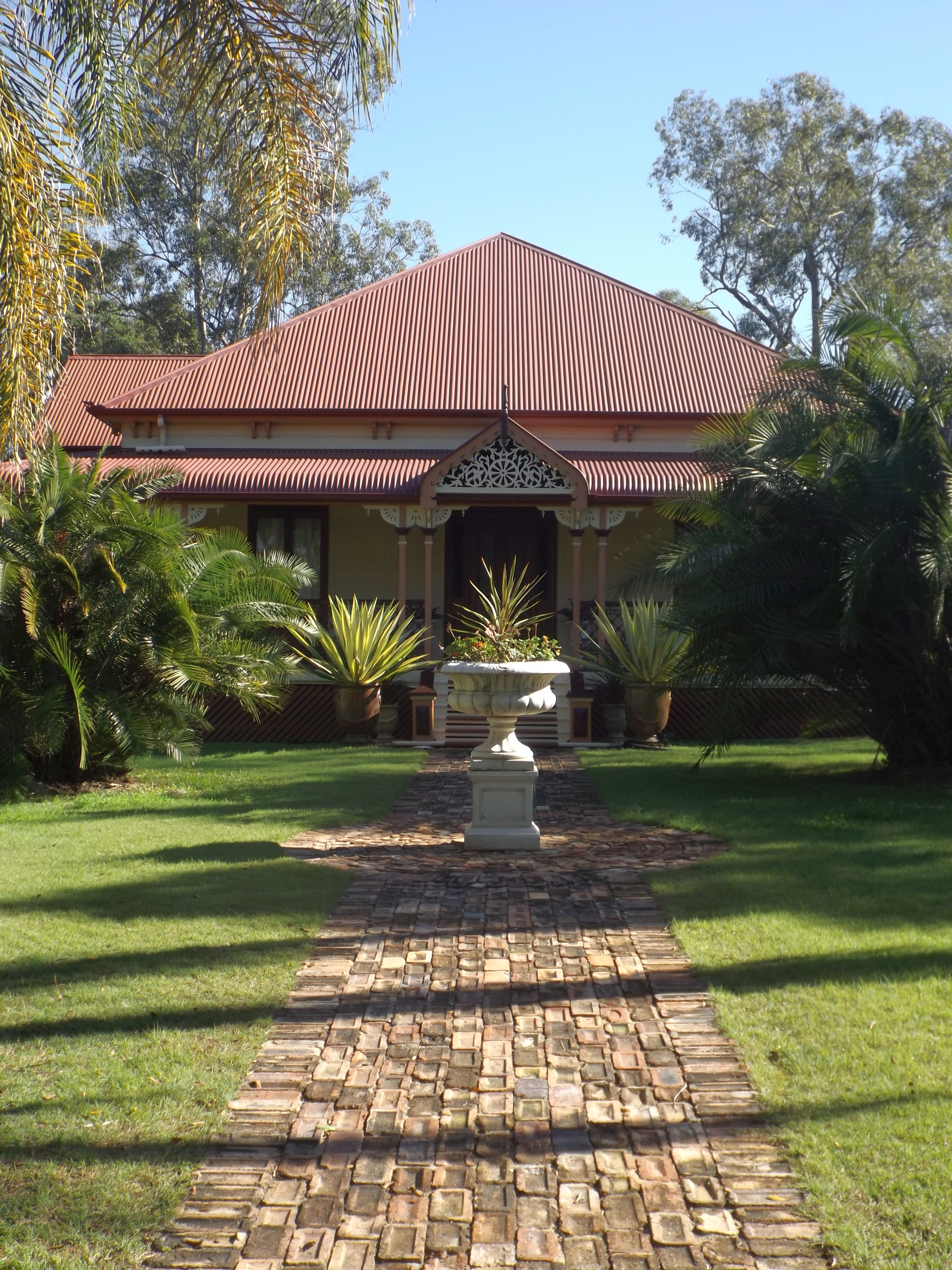
Entrance to 98 Mt Crosby Road, 2015

The Wright Family Houses are located on large allotments fronting Mt Crosby Road in Tivoli, north of the Ipswich city centre. Each allotment is long with a narrower frontage to Mt Crosby Road. The allotments extends down a gully toward a branch of Sandy Creek, where Perseverance Mine was located. All three houses are well set back from the road and are of timber construction with a square floor plan.

=== 98 Mt Crosby Road ===
The residence at 98 Mt Crosby Road has a short-ridge pyramid roof and is sheeted in corrugated iron. The front verandah has been removed. A section of side verandah on the southern side of the house remains with its iron lace balustrade, its posts, brackets and capitals, and an acroterion remains on at least one corner of the roof guttering. The iron lace is similar to or identical with that of the earlier house, Oaklands, at 100 Mt Crosby Road, and the brackets are similar or identical with those on the later house, Wrightson, at 106 Mt Crosby Road. Walls facing the former front verandah are single-skin, vertically jointed boards with horizontal bracing. Under the main roof are 5 bedrooms, a sleepout, study, formal lounge with marble and tiled fireplace, dining room, living room, and a kitchen. A small hip-roof structure at the right of the house is sheeted in corrugated iron and may originally have functioned as a service wing or business office.

=== Oaklands at 100 Mt Crosby Road ===
Oaklands is surrounded by a well-established garden, which provides strong evidence of early garden layout and includes a number of mature fig trees in the front yard. Early tiled garden-edging remains lining the borders of the front path leading to the main entrance of the house. The house has a short-ridge pyramid roof clad in corrugated iron, with two corbelled chimneystacks of brick construction rising above. Paired decorative brackets to the eaves of the main roof are located on all facades of the house. The house is surrounded on 3 sides by a stepped verandah with a skillion roof. The rear verandah has been enclosed and extended. The front pediment features a decorative timber bargeboard and finial, and the verandah has been enclosed sideways-sliding sashes featuring panelled coloured glass. The original cast iron balustrades have been retained.

=== Wrightson at 106 Mt Crosby Road ===
The pedestrian entrance to the residence at 106 Mt Crosby Road is lined by garden beds, which retain some reference to the original garden layout and which screen the facade of the house from Mt Crosby Road. The well-established garden includes a number of mature pine and conifer trees in the front yard. The front boundary is enclosed with a timber-paling fence and the side perimeter is enclosed with a wire fence. There is one vehicular entrance onto the site from Mt Crosby Road leading to a later garage on the northern side of the property. The northern perimeter of the property abuts Tivoli State School and the southern side of the property adjoins Oaklands. The original timber stumps of the house have been replaced with concrete stumps and the sub-floor is enclosed with timber battens.

The house is timber-framed and externally clad on its exposed faces in 6-inch (150 mm) deep chamferboards. The main roof of the residence is pyramid shaped and sheeted in corrugated iron, with 2 brick chimneystacks rising above. The stepped verandah has a bull-nose roof profile. Access to the verandah is gained by a short flight of timber stairs. The decorative fretwork pediment above the stairs features a sunray motif, which is repeated in the timber brackets to the verandah posts and which was a common embellishment of Irish design. The front walls are unlined, vertically jointed boards braced by horizontal beams. Dowel balustrading encloses the verandah and lattice infill panels have been installed in the front verandah bays. The northern side of the house is enclosed with a combination of early 20th century sliding and fixed windows with coloured glass. To the rear of the house is a recent covered patio area adjoining the house and a pool. A separate garage and an attached covered bay are located to the northern side of the building.

The early front door, which has a cast iron knocker, central door knob, fielded panels and bolection moulds, opens into a short central hallway which extends half the depth of the house. Internally, 2 rooms open off a short hallway. Both rooms have French doors opening onto the front verandah. The room to the left also has a sliding door opening in an area that includes 2 bathrooms, toilet and storage spaces, created by enclosing the southern verandah. At the end of the hallway a single glazed timber door with etched glass provides access to the living room, which has a white marble fireplace. To the right of the living room is a bedroom with French doors opening on to an enclosed area, which is an enclosed part of the verandah. Access from the living room to the kitchen, with its original brick fireplace, is gained through a doorway. The rear section of the house, which appears to be a 20th-century extension, is now used as a laundry, dining room and storage room. Substantial interior renovations, which are most evident in the rear section of the house and in the kitchen, have been carried out. The joinery and floors have been stripped of their original finishes.

There are timber floors throughout the house and all walls are lined with vertically jointed tongue and groove boarding. Similarly, all ceilings are lined with vertically jointed tongue and groove boarding, excluding the dining room which features what appears to be a pressed metal ceiling. All rooms have high picture rails. The hallway and living room both have bolection mould skirting boards, while all other rooms have plain skirting boards.

== Heritage listing ==
Wright Family Houses was listed on the Queensland Heritage Register on 30 January 2004 having satisfied the following criteria.

The place is important in demonstrating the evolution or pattern of Queensland's history.

The Wright family houses are important in demonstrating the evolution or pattern of Queensland's history and in demonstrating the principal characteristics of a particular class of cultural place. Built for the collier and mining proprietor, John Wright and his wife, Elizabeth, these houses are representative of the burgeoning economic fortunes of the Ipswich region during the late 19th century. As Ipswich developed into a wealthy commercial and industrial centre of Queensland and as the coal industry continued to expand in the area, the construction of these 3 houses is indicative of the prospect of rising social and financial status offered in late-19th century Ipswich. The houses communicate a tangible link with the district's mining heritage.

The place is important in demonstrating the principal characteristics of a particular class of cultural places.

The Wright family houses are important in demonstrating the evolution or pattern of Queensland's history and in demonstrating the principal characteristics of a particular class of cultural place. Built for the collier and mining proprietor, John Wright and his wife, Elizabeth, these houses are representative of the burgeoning economic fortunes of the Ipswich region during the late 19th century. As Ipswich developed into a wealthy commercial and industrial centre of Queensland and as the coal industry continued to expand in the area, the construction of these 3 houses is indicative of the prospect of rising social and financial status offered in late-19th century Ipswich. The houses communicate a tangible link with the district's mining heritage.

The place is important because of its aesthetic significance.

The houses are also important because of their aesthetic significance, which contributes to the overall historical townscape of the Ipswich area. With its rich heritage, Ipswich abounds with significant examples of early Queensland architecture and as such these houses represent an important landmark in the area and their integrity as a group is strengthened by the direct connection between them.
