= John Petrie =

Australian politician (1822–1892)

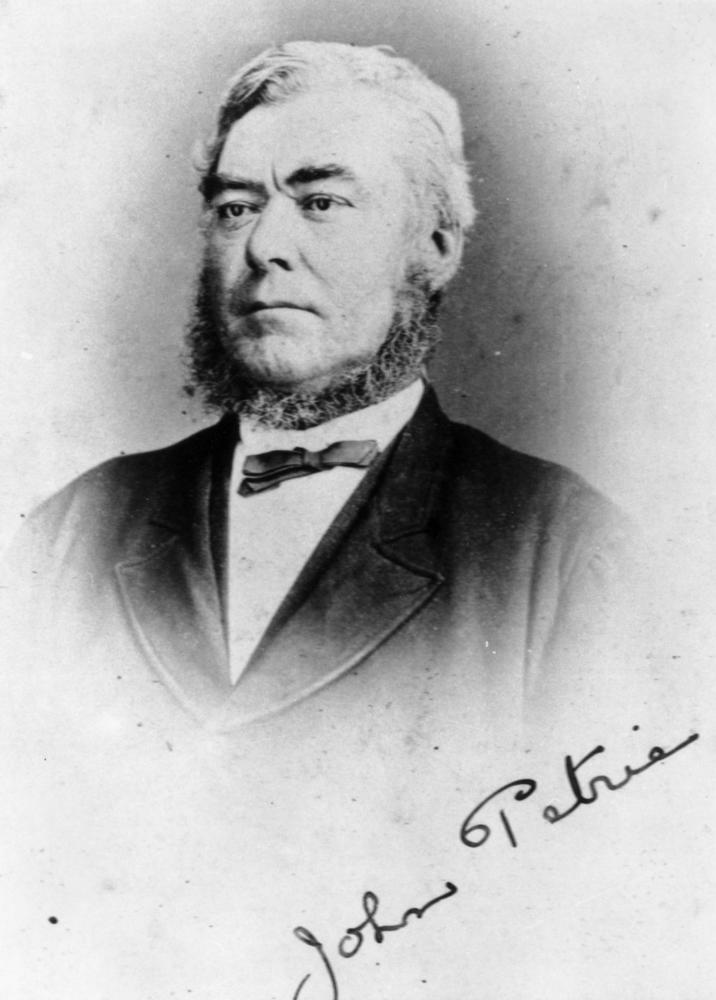
- Signed photo of John Petrie
- Born: 15 January 1822; Edinburgh, Scotland
- Died: 8 December 1892 (aged 70); Brisbane, Colony of Queensland, British Empire
- Occupations: Builder, Architect, Local Mayor/Councillor
- Known for: First mayor of Brisbane
- Board member of: Brisbane Licensing Board
- Children: 10
- Parent(s): Andrew Petrie, Mary Cuthbertson

John Petrie (15 January 1822 – 8 December 1892) was a Scottish-born Australian politician, architect, stonemason and building contractor in Brisbane who became the city's first Mayor.

== Private life ==
John Petrie was born 15 January 1822 in Edinburgh, the eldest son of Andrew Petrie and Mary Cuthbertson. He arrived in Sydney with his family in 1831 and was educated at John Dunmore Lang's school. In 1837 he went to Moreton Bay, where his father had been appointed clerk of works, and accompanied him on explorations to the west and north of Brisbane; he also became a champion oarsman. Aware that his son might be unduly influenced by the incarcerated men at the penal colony, his father only selected workmen that he considered beyond reproach to come to his home in the evening to teach his sons cabinet making and carpentry skills.

On 5 September 1850, in Brisbane, Petrie married Jane Keith McNaught, daughter of Daniel McNaught and Margaret Edgar of Dunbarton, Scotland. Daniel McNaught was a foreman of the Petrie business and contracting business after migrating to Brisbane.

The couple had five sons and five daughters:

- Margaret Jane Petrie, born in Brisbane August 1851, died at Mackay Sunday 15 February 1925
- Amelia Mary Petrie, born in Brisbane on 5 November 1852
- Andrew Lang Petrie, born in Brisbane on 25 June 1854, was the eldest son and heir to the family business; he represented Toombul in the Legislative Assembly of Queensland in 1893 and, apart from his insolvency in 1894, held the seat until 1926
- Walter Daniel Petrie, born in Brisbane on 5 January 1856, died in Brisbane on 5 November 1857
- John Petrie, born in Brisbane on 19 August 1857, died in Brisbane on 20 March 1887
- Isabella Petrie, born in Brisbane on 9 June 1859
- James Petrie, born in Brisbane on 20 January 1861
- Annie Petrie, born in Brisbane on 2 August 1863, died in Brisbane on 27 December 1863
- Agnes Petrie, born in Brisbane on 26 February 1865
- George Petrie, born in Brisbane on 20 March 1867

His wife Jane died in Brisbane on 16 December 1896 and is buried in the Petrie family plot in Toowong Cemetery.

John Petrie died on 8 December 1892 in Brisbane and is buried with his wife and family in Toowong Cemetery.

== Business life ==
Following an apprenticeship in the family building and contracting business, John assumed increasing responsibility for its management after his father's blindness in 1848 forced him to retire. John became sole proprietor and the firm was changed from Petrie & Son to John Petrie. The enviable repute for fine workmanship under his father was sustained by John. His skill can still be seen in many buildings in Brisbane, but he lacked his father's drive and business acumen. In 1882 Petrie's son, Andrew Lang, became manager of the reconstructed firm, John Petrie & Son.

== Public life ==
Although Petrie seems to have had little interest in politics, he was public-spirited and held many important offices. He topped the poll in Brisbane's first municipal election in 1859 and was mayor three times by 1862. He twice resigned from the council in protest against what he deemed the high-handedness of the majority faction, but continued after re-election to serve as an alderman until 1867.

As Mayor he had welcomed the first Governor of Queensland, Sir George Bowen, to Brisbane in 1859.

Practical experience and common sense fitted Petrie for laying the sound foundations of municipal administration in Brisbane and for guiding the council in providing public works and services. Closely associated with the Enoggera Dam while it was planned by the council, he later saw it constructed as a member of the Board of Water Works; as its chairman in 1875 he was a leader in implementing the Gold Creek Dam and planning of the Mount Crosby Weir. After serving as mayor, he had difficulty in 'playing second fiddle' and was prone to indulge in such manoeuvres as walking out of council meetings.

Petrie devoted much time to community welfare. For years he served on the management committee of the Brisbane Hospital and was chairman after 1885. He was also a member of the Board for Administering Outdoor Relief and the Central Board of Health. Appointed to the New South Wales Commission of the Peace in 1859, he remained a member of the Brisbane bench until 1892. He gave long service on the Brisbane Licensing Board and was often returning officer for the parliamentary elections. A trustee of the Brisbane general cemetery and of Bowen Park and a ranger for protecting native birds on the Enoggera Water Reserve, he was a director of several building societies and of the Queensland Steam Navigation Co. Elected to the North Brisbane School of Arts Committee in 1864 and 1866, he was also an enthusiastic member of the first Masonic lodge in Queensland.

A staunch Presbyterian, he was an elder and worked with enthusiasm in building St Pauls Presbyterian Church, Spring Hill. Integrity and long association with the city made him one of the best known citizens of Brisbane. He died in December 1892.

== Honours ==
John Petrie was inducted into the Queensland University of Technology's Construction Hall of Fame on 2 November 2010.

== See also ==
- List of mayors and lord mayors of Brisbane
- The Old Windmill, Brisbane
