= Colleges Crossing =

College's Crossing
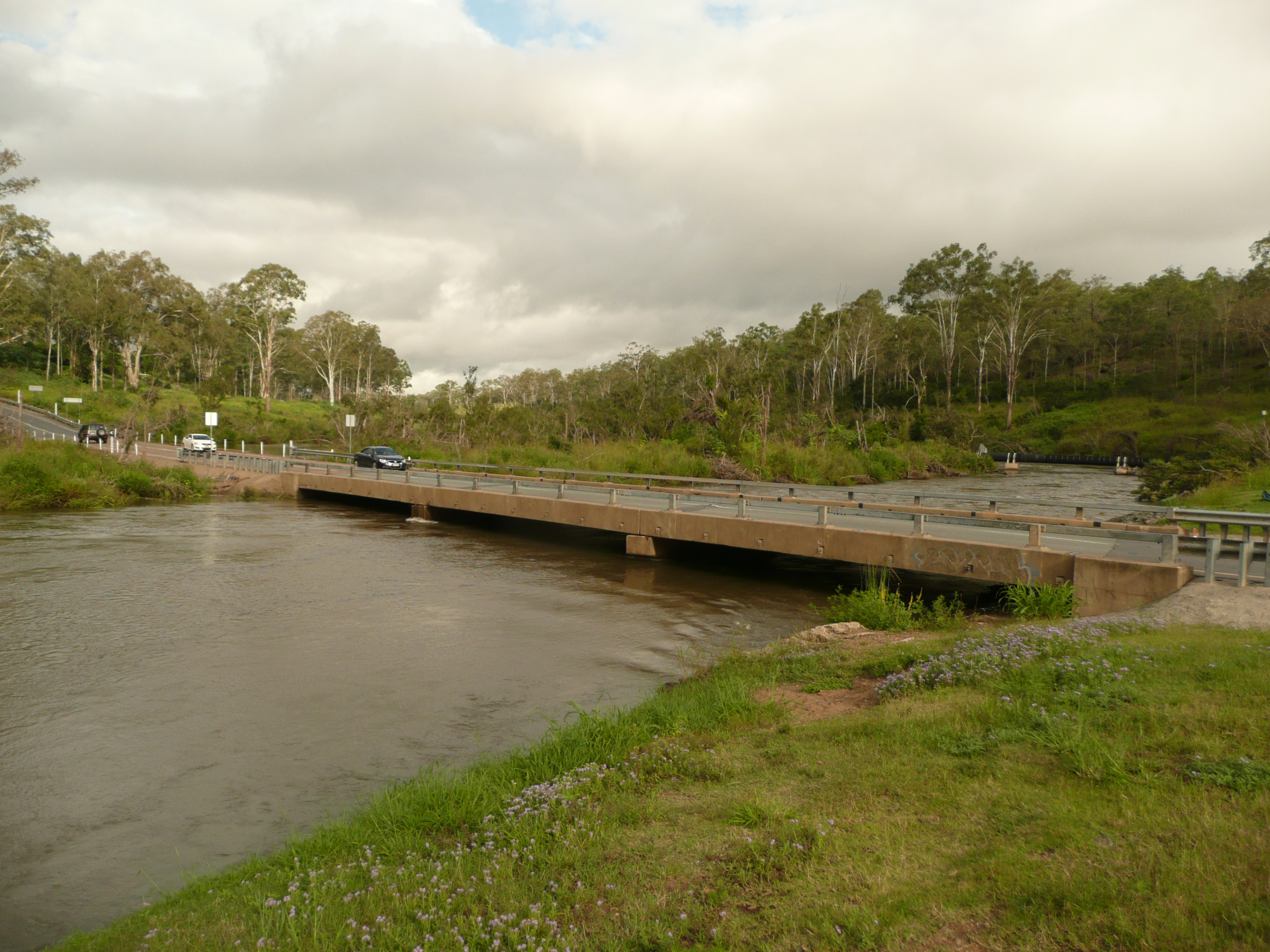
- College's Crossing
- Coordinates: 27°33′25″S 152°48′15″E
- Carries: Motor vehicles
- Crosses: Brisbane River
- Locale: Chuwar, Queensland, Australia
- Other name(s): Colleges Crossing
- Maintained by: Department of Transport and Main Roads

Characteristics
- Design: Beam bridge
- Material: Concrete
- No. of spans: 3

History
- Replaces: Wooden bridge 1894 -??

College's Crossing (also known as Colleges Crossing) is a low level bridge that crosses the Brisbane River at Chuwar, a suburb of Ipswich in South East Queensland, Australia.

The road across the bridge is Mount Crosby Road. During major floods or water releases from the Wivenhoe Dam the road becomes impassable.

The crossing was constructed to replace a previous structure which had been washed away during floods. It was opened in 1894 with a ceremony that was attended by the Mayor of Ipswich, H.E. Wyman.

College's Crossing is named after George College (sometimes spelled Colledge), one of the first settlers who bought a land on the north side of the Brisbane River in 1854. It was the first river crossing in the district which allowed access across the river before the first bridge was constructed.

Located here is a park, known as Colleges Crossing Recreational Reserve, which is a popular picnic and tourist spot for the residents of Brisbane and Ipswich from the early 1920s. It was completely destroyed during the 2010-11 floods, which saw a rise in the water level of over 17 metres with strong currents.

The park was equipped with barbecues, playground facilities, a cafe, lookouts, boat ramp, bird hide and clean water for drinking. Swimming, canoeing, kayaking and fishing are also popular in the area.

Four and half kilometres upstream from Colleges Crossing is the Mount Crosby Weir and Mount Crosby Pumping Station. Downstream from the crossing swimming is not recommended due to the presence of bull sharks and due to poor water quality. In 1960 2 shark attacks were reported in Sunday Mail 27/3/94, SMH 21/12/1960. In January 1939 the Courier Mail reported the landing of a 4 ft 6in bluenose shark on a rod and reel at the popular bathing spot.

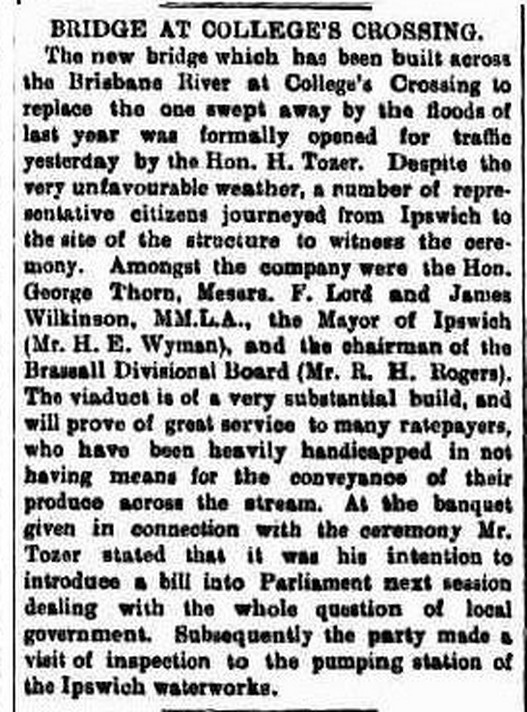
An 1894 notice regarding the opening of the bridge crossing

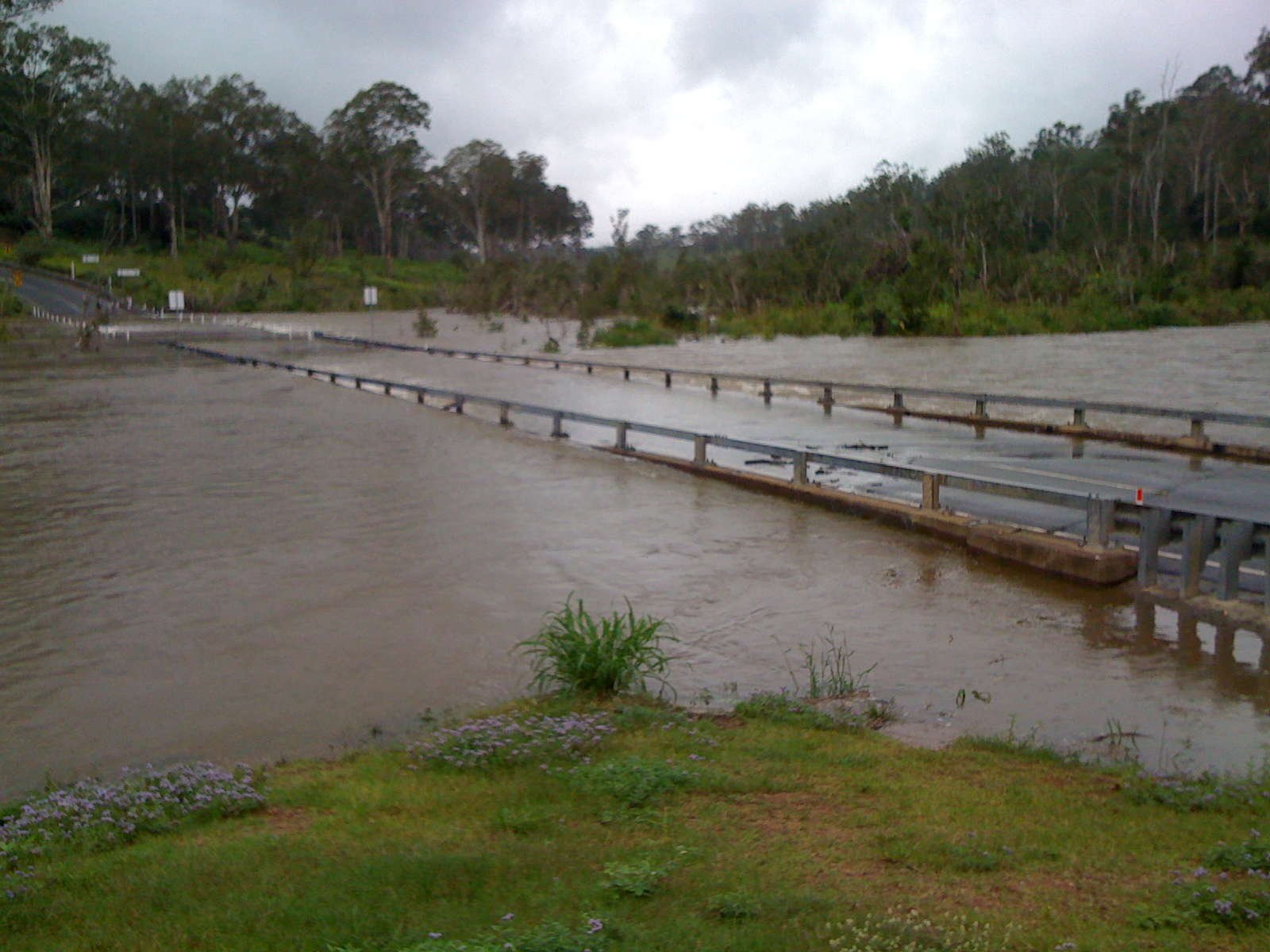
College's Crossing under water in January 2012

== See also ==
- Bridges over the Brisbane River
