= Mount Crosby Weir =

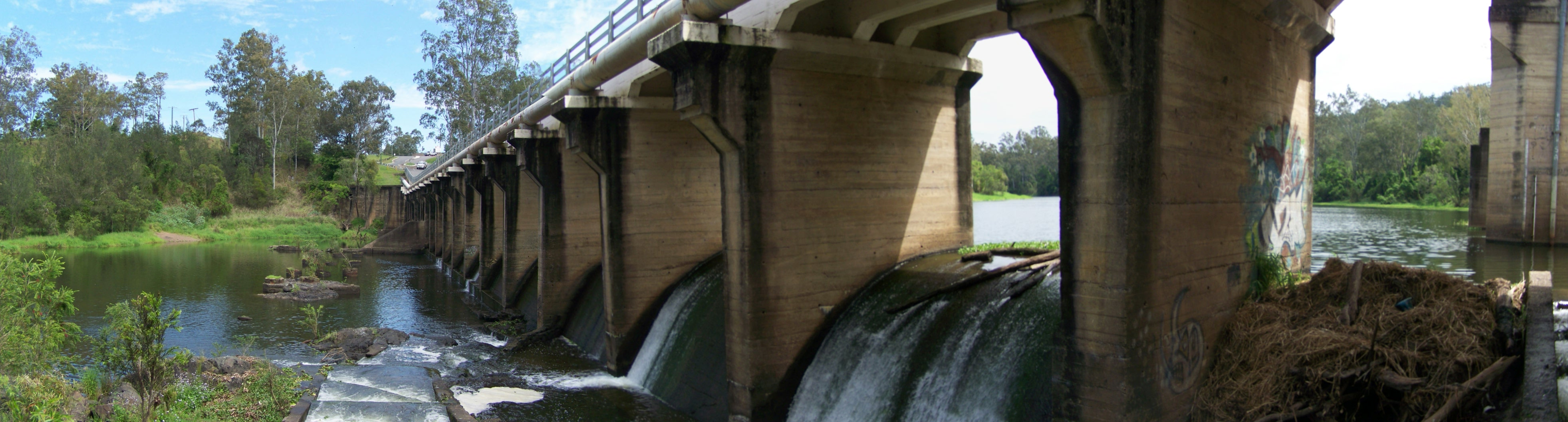
- View from the southern side of the weir, looking upstream, towards the reservoir.

- Location of the weir in Queensland
- Interactive map of Mount Crosby Weir
- Country: Australia
- Location: South East Queensland
- Coordinates: 27°32′14″S 152°47′52″E
- Purpose: Potable water supply
- Status: Operational
- Opening date: 1892
- Operator: SEQ Water

Dam and spillways
- Type of dam: Weir
- Impounds: Brisbane River
- Height: 4.57 m (15.0 ft)
- Length: 81.4 m (267 ft)

Reservoir
- Total capacity: 3,430 ML (750×10^{6} imp gal; 910×10^{6} US gal)
- Maximum width: 30.5 m (100 ft)
- Normal elevation: 141.34 m (463.7 ft) AHD
- Website seqwater.com.au

Queensland Heritage Register
- Official name: Mount Crosby Pumping Station Complex
- Type: State heritage (built)
- Designated: 25 October 2019
- Reference no.: 650236

The Mount Crosby Weir is a heritage-listed weir on the Brisbane River at Mount Crosby and Chuwar, both in City of Brisbane, Queensland, Australia. The project was instigated by John Petrie at the end of the 19th century. The town of Brisbane was expanding and seeking more reliable sources of drinking water than Enoggera Dam and Gold Creek Dam could provide. In conjunction with the Mount Crosby Pumping Station, it was listed on the Queensland Heritage Register on 25 October 2019.

== Location and features ==
The location was selected because it was just above the upstream tidal flow of seawater at Colleges Crossing. The concrete structure was completed in April 1892. The dam wall rises 4.57 metres (15.0 ft) and is 81.4 metres (267 ft) in length. The weir has a capacity of 3,430 megalitres (750×10^{6} imp gal; 910×10^{6} US gal), making it one of the largest weirs in the region. Above the weir is a one-lane road which is open to the public.

The nearby Mount Crosby Pumping Station is used to transport drinking water that is sourced from both the weir and the nearby Lake Manchester Dam, which was built shortly after the Mount Crosby Weir.

Without an ongoing eradication program, water hyacinth weed can choke the waters behind the weir, all the way upstream to Fernvale. In 2009, the weir was flushed to remove algae and organic matter that had built up.

== See also ==
- List of dams in Queensland
- South East Queensland Water Grid
