= Mount Ommaney Shopping Centre bus station =

Bus station in Brisbane, Queensland, Australia

Mount Ommaney
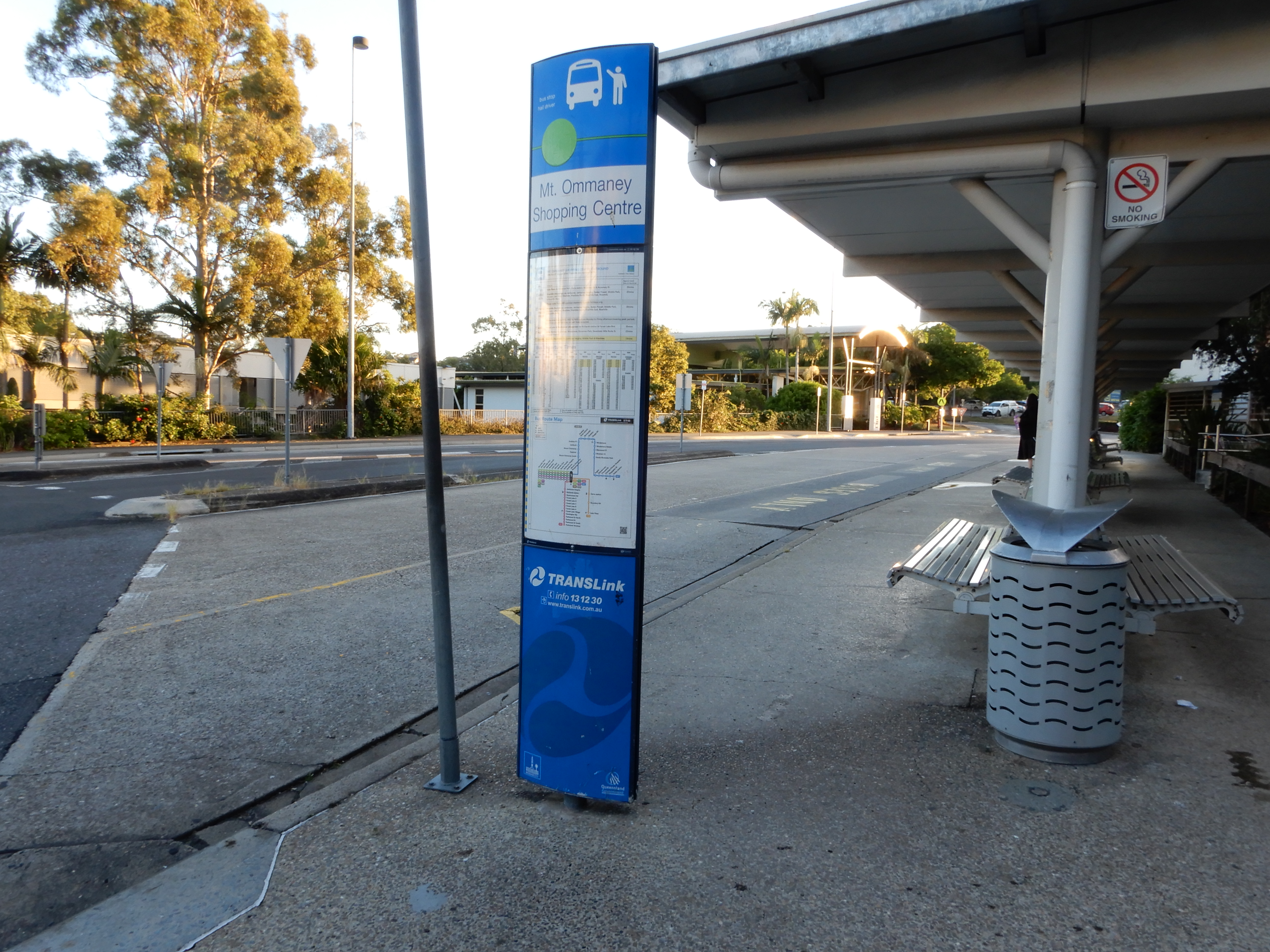
- Northbound view from platform

General information
- Location: Dandenong Road, Mount Ommaney
- Coordinates: 27.548671°S 152.937967°E
- Platforms: 2 side

Construction
- Parking: No
- Accessible: Yes

Other information
- Status: Unstaffed
- Station code: 5271
- Website: Translink
Location

Mount Ommaney is a bus station operated by Translink. It serves the Brisbane suburb of Mount Ommaney. The bus station is situated next to Mount Ommaney Shopping Centre and a Brisbane City Council library.

== Services by platform ==
Mount Ommaney bus station has one platform. A second platform exists to stable buses that are waiting to begin service, though it is not primarily for passenger use.

Route	Destination bus stop	Suburbs	Ref(s)
103	Inala	Inala via Darra	
106	Indooroopilly	Indooroopilly	
450	Queen Street	Brisbane City via Jindalee and Indooroopilly	
453	Queen Street	Brisbane City via Jindalee and Indooroopilly	
454	Queen Street	Brisbane City via Indooroopilly	
P455	Eagle Street	Brisbane City	
P456	Eagle Street	Brisbane City via Jindalee	
460	Queen Street	Brisbane City via Indooroopilly	
N449	Spine Street	Riverhills	
450	Riverhills West	Riverhills	
454	Riverhills West	Riverhills	
P455	Riverhills West	Riverhills	
460	Parkwood Terminus	Heathwood via Forest Lake	
467	Oxley Station		
