= Centenary Suburbs =

Centenary
- Suburb
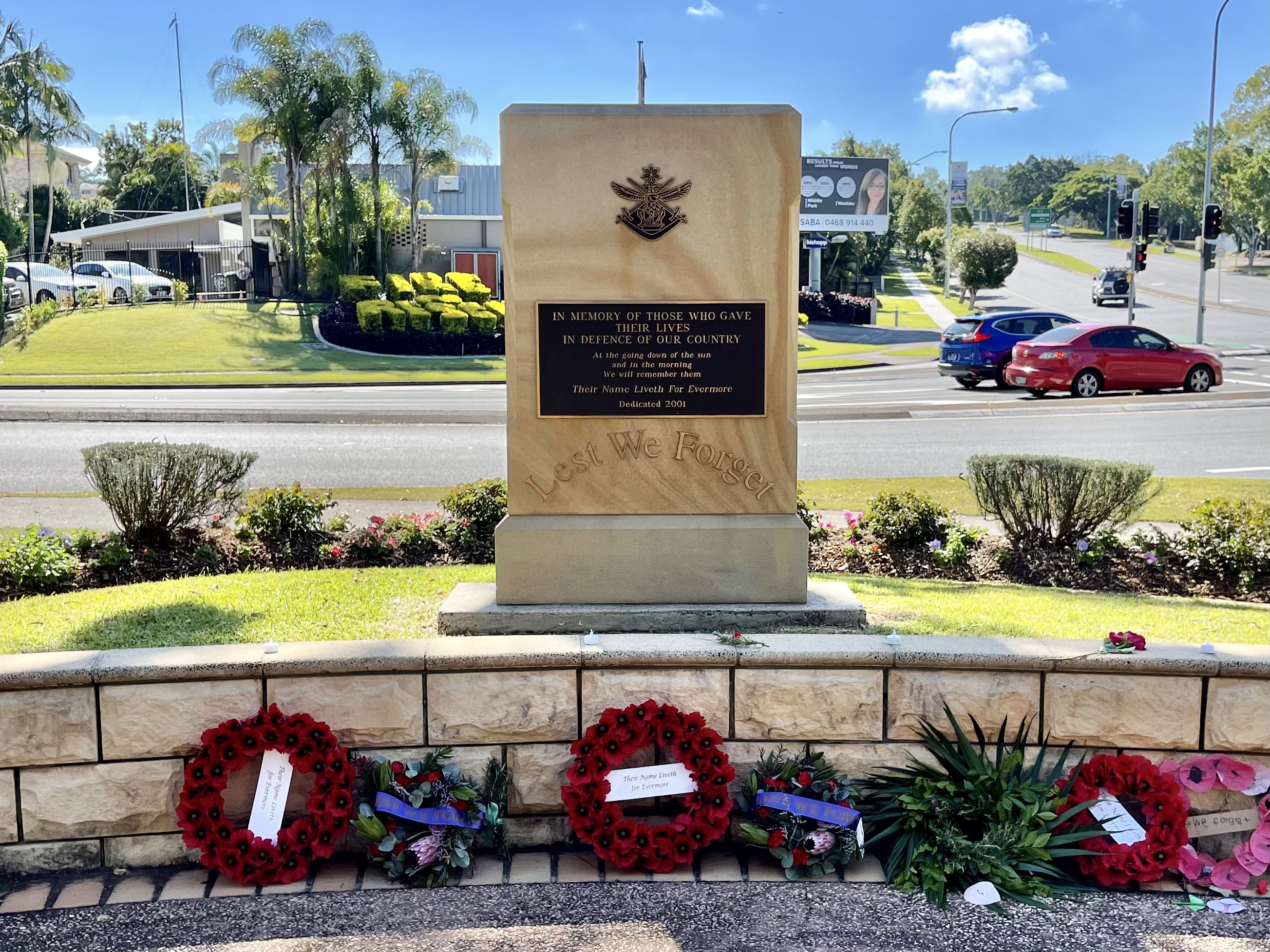
- Centenary Suburbs War Memorial Gardens, 2021
- Country: Australia
- State: Queensland
- City: Brisbane
- LGA: City of Brisbane Jamboree Ward
- Location: 17.5 km (10.9 mi) SW of Brisbane CBD

Government
  - State electorate: Mount Ommaney
  - Federal division: Oxley

Area
  - Total: 17.0 km^{2} (6.6 sq mi)

Population
  - Total: 33,016 (2021 census)
  - Density: 1,942/km^{2} (5,030/sq mi)
- Postcode: 4074, 4073
Suburbs around Centenary
Pinjarra Hills	Kenmore	Fig Tree Pocket
Bellbowrie	Centenary	Oxley
Moggill	Wacol	Darra

The Centenary Suburbs are a group of suburbs in the south-west in the City of Brisbane, Queensland, Australia. The suburbs originated as an "ambitious long-term suburban development proposal that included a number of neighbourhoods, or suburbs, each with sufficient services and facilities for its residents to have their day-to-day needs met without having to go elsewhere".

In the 2021 census, the Centenary suburbs had a population of 33,016 people.

== History ==
Initially, the area was largely used for grazing and dairy farming.

The western part of the original land holdings that became the Centenary Suburbs were part of the Wolston Estate, consisting of 54 farms on an area of 3000 acres, offered for auction at Centennial Hall, Brisbane, on 16 October 1901. Wolston Estate is the property of M. B. Goggs, whose father obtained the land forty years previously in the 1860s and after whom Goggs Road is named. Only three of the farms sold at the original auction.

The area was given its name by land developer Hooker Rex in 1959, Queensland's centenary year that marked its separation from New South Wales in 1859. Originally the land was all known as Jindalee, indeed the 1967/68 Australian Scout Jamboree, held in what is now Jamboree Heights, is recorded as being held in Jindalee.

From 1960 onwards Jindalee was progressively broken up into smaller suburbs, being:

- Jindalee
- Mount Ommaney
- Jamboree Heights
- Middle Park
- Westlake
- Riverhills
- Sumner

The area was severely damaged in the 1974 floods, including structural damage to the Centenary Bridge after a barge became stuck under the upstream side of the then two-lane bridge. The barge was deliberately holed using explosives and allowed to sink to reduce the floodwater pressure, before being refloated after the flood waters had receded and beached near Fig Tree Pocket to be cut up for scrap. The damage sustained by the bridge required its partial closure for repairs, prior to its duplication in 1980.

While originally referring to new suburbs west of Centenary Highway, the new residential areas developed on the eastern side of that highway, namely Sinnamon Park and Seventeen Mile Rocks have been included within the Centenary suburbs since the 2011 census. However, the mostly industrial suburb of Sumner is excluded.

The Centenary Suburbs War Memorial was unveiled on Anzac Day, 25 April 2001 by Julie Attwood, the Member of the Queensland Legislative Assembly for Mount Ommaney.

== Demographics ==
In the 2016 census, the Centenary suburbs had a population of 32,529 people.

In the 2021 census, the Centenary suburbs had a population of 33,016 people.

== Environmental Protection ==
As residential expansion progressed, the 1990s saw the rise of community efforts to preserve riverfront bushland along the Brisbane River and encourage environmental protection of remnant natural areas in the Centenary Suburbs. The first groups which formed to forge this greater interest in grassroots environmental protection were:

- Save Our Riverfront Bushland (SORB), established Sep 1991;
- Westlake-Riverhills Bushcare Group, established1993; and
- Centenary and District Environment Action Inc, established 1996.

Westlake-Riverhills Bushcare Group (WRBG) was the first community-based, volunteer-run bushland rehabilitation group to be established in the Centenary Suburbs. WRBG commenced operations in 1993 at its site at Pullen Reach, under the auspices of Brisbane City Council through a program that came to be known as Habitat Brisbane.

By the late 1990s, additional local Habitat Brisbane bushland rehabilitation groups began to flourish, and by 2010 there were around a dozen such groups in the Centenary Suburbs and the surrounding south-western suburbs of Brisbane.

In 2008, a community-based catchment group, Wolston and Centenary Catchments (WaCC), was formed. Since May 2014, WaCC has been operating from its base at the Pooh Corner Environment Centre (PCEC). This facility is located at the Wolston Road frontage to the Pooh Corner Bushland Reserve.

The formation and activities of the above-mentioned groups in the Centenary Suburbs has fulfilled, in part, certain observations by conservation ecologist, Peter Young, who stated in 1990:

While it is unrealistic to suppose that there will be any large-scale rehabilitation or regeneration of land to something approaching its natural condition in the foreseeable future, some small tracts of land in the lower reaches (of the Brisbane River) deserve better care than they currently receive. ... Initiatives for the rehabilitation and care of such areas have to come from local communities, not government bodies, to be effective.

Indeed, Young specifically identified remnant vegetation pockets both within, and upstream of, the Centenary Suburbs, including a rainforest fragment then still present on a small tributary below Mt Ommaney. That particular remnant vegetation fragment is adjacent to the site where the Jindalee Bushcare Group established and continues to operate. That group's site encompasses the Mount Ommaney walkway, which skirts the slope below the prominent hill that bears the same name, and is adjacent to Mount Ommaney Creek, near its confluence with the Brisbane River.

== Public transport ==
The following bus routes service all or part of the Centenary Suburbs:

- 103 - Mount Ommaney - Inala : Local via Darra (Every day) (BT)
- 106 - Mount Ommaney - Indooroopilly : Local via Sinnamon Park, Seventeen Mile Rocks, Oxley, Corinda, Sherwood, Graceville and Chelmer (Monday-Saturday) (BT)
- 450 - City - Riverhills : CityXpress via Cultural Centre, Coronation Drive, Toowong, Indooroopilly, Jindalee, Mount Ommaney, Jamboree Heights, Middle Park and Westlake (Weekends) (BT)
- 451 - Mount Ommaney - Darra Station : Link via Sinnamon Park (Weekdays - Peak Hours Only) (BT)
- 452 - Riverhills - Darra Station : Loop via Middle Park (Weekdays - Peak Hours Only) (BT)
- 453 - City - Mount Ommaney : CityXpress via Cultural Centre, Coronation Drive, Toowong, Indooroopilly and Jindalee (Weekdays) (BT)
- 454 - City - Riverhills : CityXpress via Cultural Centre, Coronation Drive, Toowong, Indooroopilly, Mount Ommaney, Jamboree Heights, Middle Park and Westlake (Weekdays) (BT)
- 455 - City - Riverhills : Rocket via Legacy Way, Western Freeway, Mount Ommaney, Jamboree Heights, Middle Park and Westlake (Weekdays - Peak Hours only) (BT)
- 456 - City - Mount Ommaney : Rocket via Legacy Way, Western Freeway and Jindalee (Weekdays - Peak Hours only) (BT)
- 457 - City - Riverhills : City Precincts via Coronation Drive, Western Freeway, Jindalee, Mount Ommaney, Jamboree Heights, Middle Park and Westlake (Weekdays - Peak Hours only) (BT)
- 458 - City - Mount Ommaney : City Precincts via Coronation Drive, Western Freeway and Jindalee. (Weekdays - Peak Hours only) (BT)
- 459 - City - Riverhills : City Precincts via Coronation Drive, Western Freeway, Mount Ommaney, Jamboree Heights, Middle Park and Westlake (Weekdays - Peak Hours only) (BT)
- 460 - City - Forest Lake & Inala : CityXpress via Cultural Centre, Coronation Drive, Toowong, Indooroopilly and Mount Ommaney (Every day) (BT)
- N464 - City & Valley - Forest Lake : NightLink via Fortitude Valley, City, Milton, Toowong, Indooroopilly and Mount Ommaney (Late night Friday - Saturday only) (BT)

== Schools ==
There are three state primary schools, one private primary school and one state high school in the Centenary suburbs, being:

School name	Opened	Colours	Address	Website
Jindalee State School	1966		Burrendah Road, Jindalee	http://www.jindaleess.eq.edu.au/
Jamboree Heights State School	January 1974		Beanland Street, Jamboree Heights	https://web.archive.org/web/20110205082717/http://www.jambheigss.eq.edu.au/
Good News Lutheran School	1984		Horizon Drive, Middle Park	http://www.goodnews.qld.edu.au/
Middle Park State School	January 1987		Sumners Road, Middle Park	https://web.archive.org/web/20071010020628/http://www.middparkss.eq.edu.au/
Centenary State High School	1999		Moolanda Street, Jindalee	http://www.centenaryshs.eq.edu.au/
