= Indooroopilly bus station =

Bus station in Brisbane, Australia

Indooroopilly
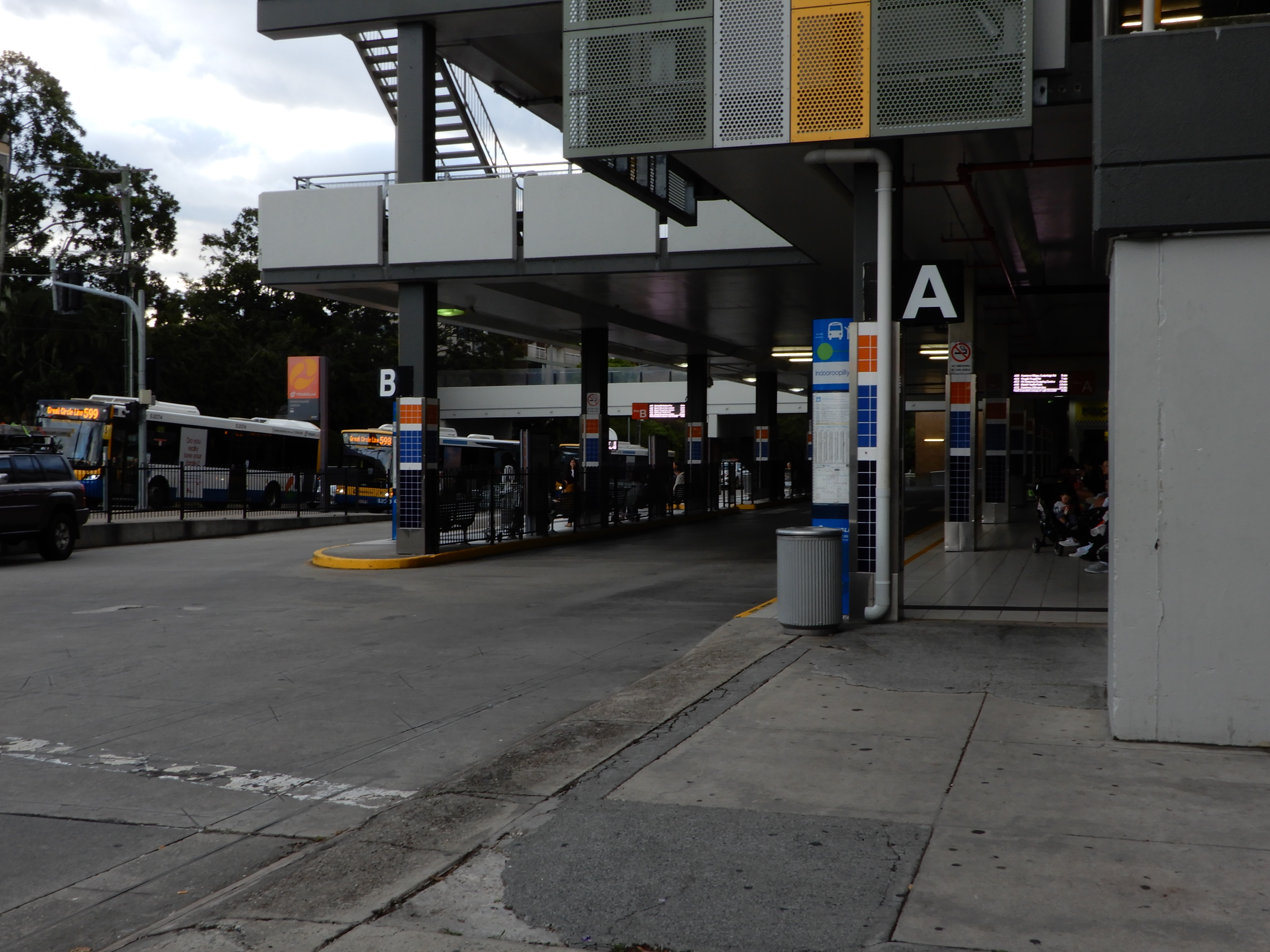
- Indooroopilly bus station in July 2019

General information
- Location: Musgrave Road, Indooroopilly
- Coordinates: 27.500922°S 152.971658°E
- Owner: Indooroopilly Shopping Centre
- Platforms: 3 side platforms

Construction
- Accessible: Yes

Other information
- Status: Unstaffed
- Station code: 2191 (platform A); 2200 (platform B); 2204 (platform C)
- Website: Translink
Location

Indooroopilly is a bus station operated by Translink. The bus station forms part of the Indooroopilly Shopping Centre and is a major interchange for inner-city bus lines. Indooroopilly train station is located within walking distance from Indooroopilly.

== Services ==
Indooroopilly has three platforms. Platform A is mainly used for outbound services, platform B for inbound services and platform C for special-type services.

Platform	Route	Destination bus stop	Suburbs	Ref(s)
A	105	Eagle Street	Brisbane City	
A	106	Mount Ommaney Shopping Centre	Mount Ommaney	
A	108	Adelaide Street	Brisbane City	
A	425	Kenmore Village	Kenmore	
A	430	Mandalay	Fig Tree Pocket	
A	433	Dumbarton Drive	Kenmore	
A	435	Kailua Street	Brookfield	
A	444	Moggill	Moggill	
A	445	Fig Tree Pocket Road	Fig Tree Pocket	
A	N449	Spine Street	Riverhills via Mount Ommaney	
A	450	Riverhills West	Riverhills via Jindalee	
A	453	Mount Ommaney Shopping Centre	Mount Ommaney	
A	454	Riverhills West	Riverhills	
A	460	Parkwood Terminus	Heathwood via Forest Lake	
A	468	Oxley Station	Oxley	
B	415	Wickham Terrace	Brisbane City	
B	425	Queen Street	Brisbane City	
B	430	Queen Street	Brisbane City	
B	433	Wickham Terrace	Brisbane City	
B	435	Queen Street	Brisbane City	
B	444	Gallery of Modern Art	South Brisbane via Brisbane CBD	
B	445	Wickham Terrace	Brisbane City	
B	450	Queen Street	Brisbane City	
B	453	Queen Street	Brisbane City	
B	454	Queen Street	Brisbane City	
B	460	Queen Street	Brisbane City	
C	427	University of Queensland	St Lucia	
C	428	University of Queensland	St Lucia	
C	432	University of Queensland	St Lucia	
C	598	Anti-clockwise		
C	599	Clockwise		
