= Darra, Queensland =

Darra
- Suburb
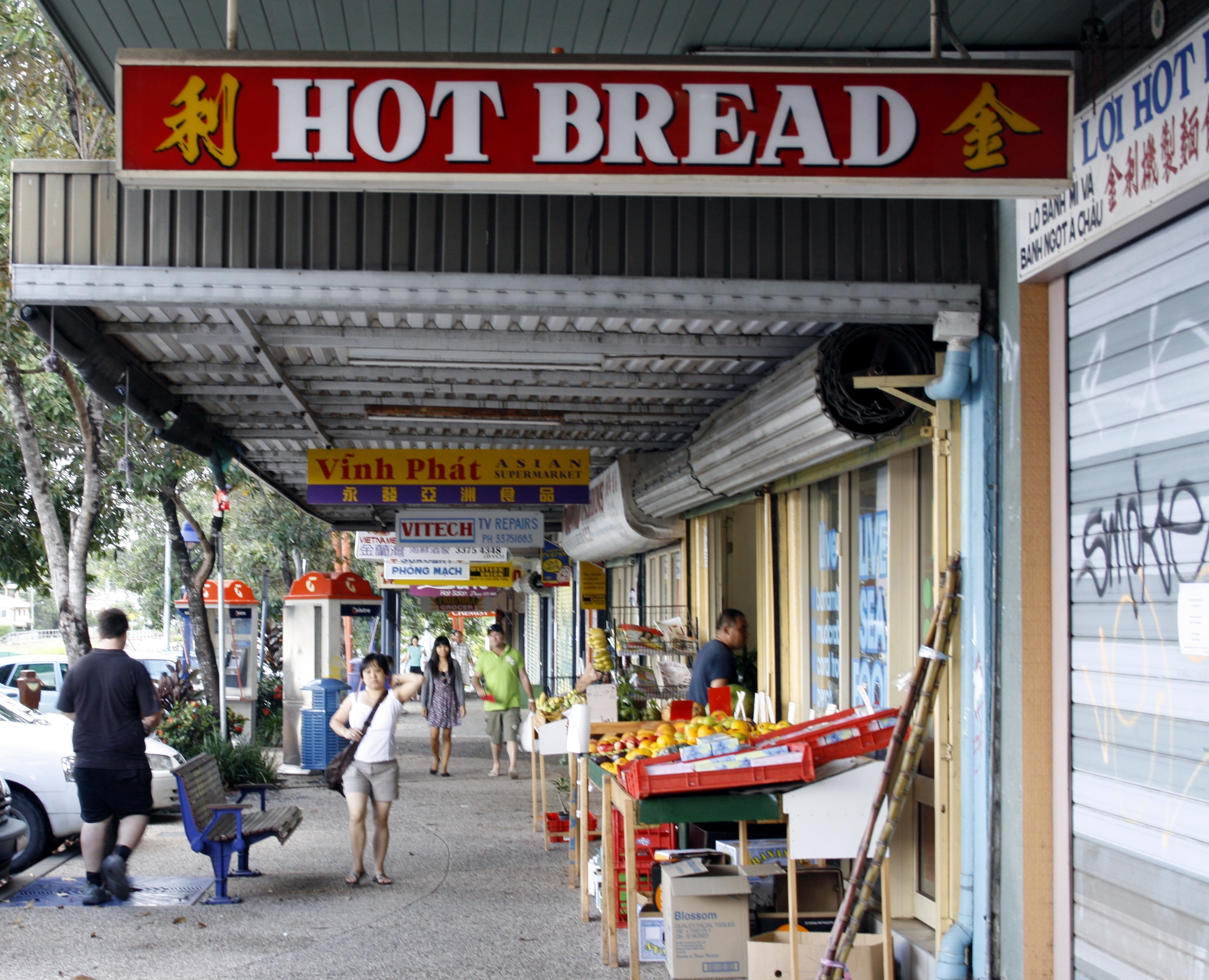
- Shops in Darra

- Interactive map of Darra
- Coordinates: 27.5636°S 152.9552°E
- Country: Australia
- State: Queensland
- City: Brisbane
- LGA: City of Brisbane
- Location: 18.5 km (11.5 mi) SW of Brisbane CBD
- Established: 1864

Government
  - State electorates: Inala; Mount Ommaney
  - Federal division: Oxley

Area
  - Total: 5.5 km^{2} (2.1 sq mi)

Population
  - Total: 4,098 (2021 census)
  - Density: 745/km^{2} (1,930/sq mi)
- Time zone: UTC+10:00 (AEST)
- Postcode: 4076
Suburbs around Darra
Jamboree Heights	Sinnamon Park	Seventeen Mile Rocks
Sumner	Darra	Oxley
Wacol	Richlands	Inala

Darra is a south-western suburb in the City of Brisbane, Queensland, Australia. In the 2021 census, Darra had a population of 4,098 people.

== Geography ==
Darra is located 18.5 kilometres (11.5 mi) by road south-west of the Brisbane GPO.

The intersection of the Ipswich Motorway (M7) and Centenary Motorway (M5) is in the south-west of Darra.

Brisbane Technology Park Westlink Green is located at Westlink Court, next to Darra railway station.

There are industrial estates in the north-west, east, and south of the suburb, while land use in the south-west through to the north-east of the suburb is residential with associated services.

== History ==
The first subdivisions in the area occurred in 1864.

Wolston Estate was the property of M. B. Goggs, whose father obtained the land forty years previously in the 1860s and after whom Goggs Road is named.

The name Darra comes from the Darra railway station, which in turn was named in mid-1876 by the Queensland Railways Department. In 1914, the Railways did not know the origin of the name. In 1884 Darra was the scene of a serious collision between two trains; James Griffith, the driver of the passenger train, was fatally injured, and several passengers also suffered.

In 1879, the local government area of Yeerongpilly Division was created. In 1891, parts of Yeerongpilly Division were excised to create Sherwood Division becoming a Shire in 1903 which contained the area of Wolston Estate. A portion of Darra comes from the Wolston Estate, consisting of 54 farms on an area of 3000 acres, offered for auction at Centennial Hall, Brisbane, on 16 October 1901. Only three of the farms sold at the original auction.

Darra Methodist Church opened on Saturday 13 March 1915 by Reverend William Smith, President of the Queensland Methodist Conference. When the Methodist Church amalgamated into the Uniting Church in Australia, it became the Darra Uniting Church.

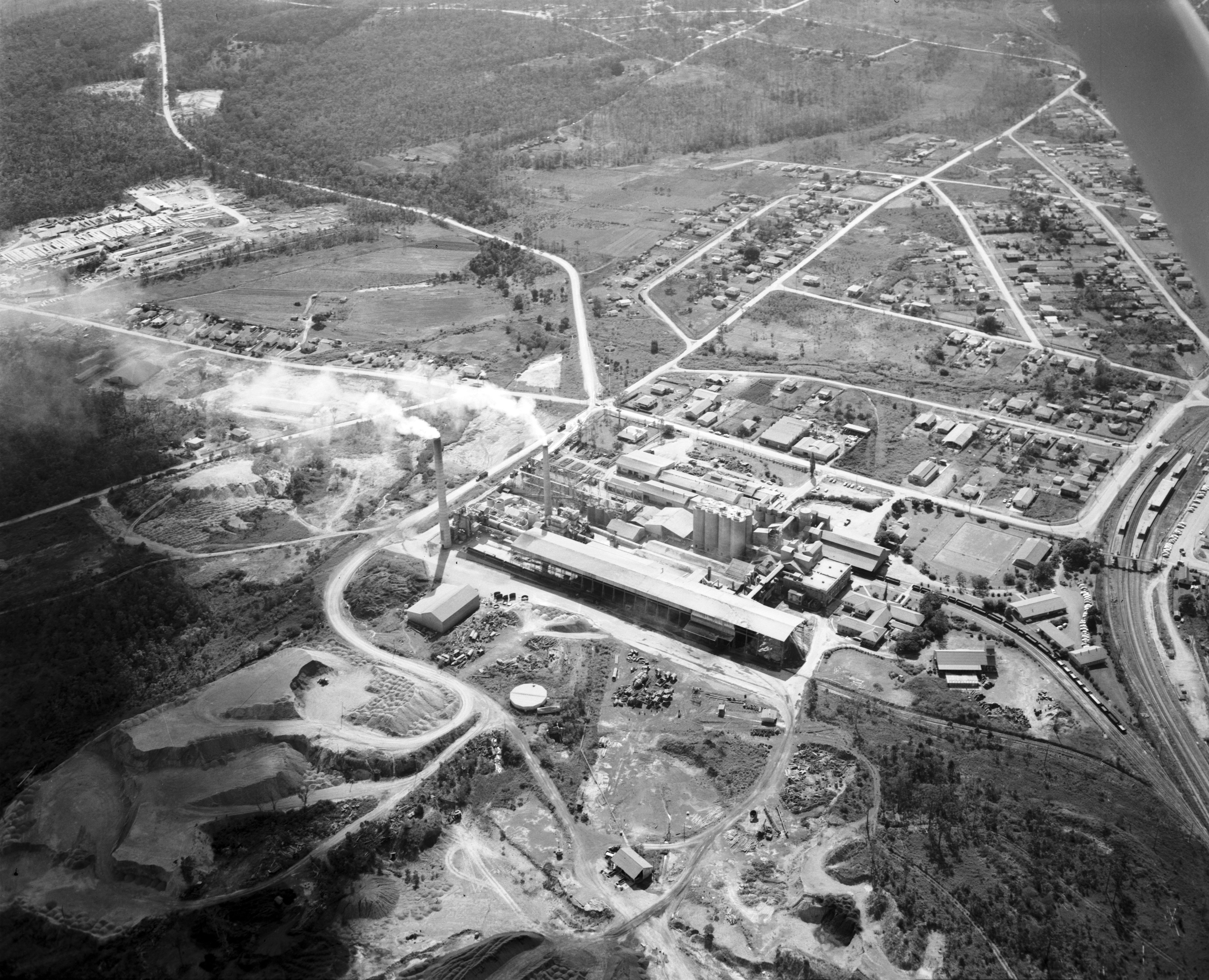
Queensland Cement and Lime Company, with Darra railway station (far right), April 1965

In 1914, Queensland Cement and Lime Company was formed established a cement manufacturing plant in Darra. The company (by then known as Queensland Cement Limited) closed the Darra plant in 1998 after losing its right to dredge Moreton Bay for coral from which lime was extracted to make cement.

Darra State School opened on 1 June 1916.

In 1925, the Shire of Sherwood was amalgamated into the City of Brisbane.

Our Lady of the Sacred Heart School was established on 5 April 1937 by the Sisters of Our Lady of the Sacred Heart. In 1987 the school opened a pre-school at Jindalee and the school's name became Darra-Jindalee Catholic School. The Jindalee site was closed in 2003. On 14 July 2008 the school was again renamed to be Our Lady of the Sacred Heart School Darra.

In 1954, the Darra RSL Memorial Hall was opened. Sumner was known as Darra until 1969 when it became a separate suburb. Vietnamese refugees began to settle in the area in 1975. The origin of the word Darra came from the Aboriginal word for 'stones'.

The Anglican Church of the Holy Spirit was dedicated in 1955 by Venerable Harold John Richards. Its closure about 28 October 2010 was approved by Archbishop Phillip Aspinall.

The houses are mainly of the Queenslander style built in the 1940s and 1950s. The majority of blocks in Darra are large enough to be subdivided, which is becoming popular in the suburb, hence making room for more modern homes. In the last few years, a property developer bought a vast tract of vacant, government land. As a result, there are now many new homes and townhouses built in Darra, which has increased its population and its geographical boundaries.

== Demographics ==
In the 2016 census, Darra had a population of 4,343 people.

In the 2021 census, Darra had a population of 4,098 people.

== Education ==
Darra State School is a government primary (Preparatory to Year 6) school for boys and girls at Winslow Street (27.5705°S 152.9534°E). In 2017, the school had an enrolment of 201 students with 22 teachers (16 full-time equivalent) and 17 non-teaching staff (12 full-time equivalent).

Our Lady of the Sacred Heart Catholic Primary School is a Catholic primary (Preparatory to Year 6) school for boys and girls at 115 Darra Station Road (27.5680°S 152.9522°E). In 2017, the school had an enrolment of 531 students with 38 teachers (33 full-time equivalent) and 15 non-teaching staff (11 full-time equivalent).

There are no secondary schools in Darra. The nearest government secondary schools are Centenary State High School in Jindalee to the north, Corinda State High School in Corinda to the north-east, and Glenala State High School in Durack to the south-west.

== Amenities ==
Linh Son Temple, a Vietnamese Buddhist temple is located in the suburb.

Darra Vietnamese Uniting Church is at 6 Lee Road (27.5670°S 152.9523°E).

== Transport ==
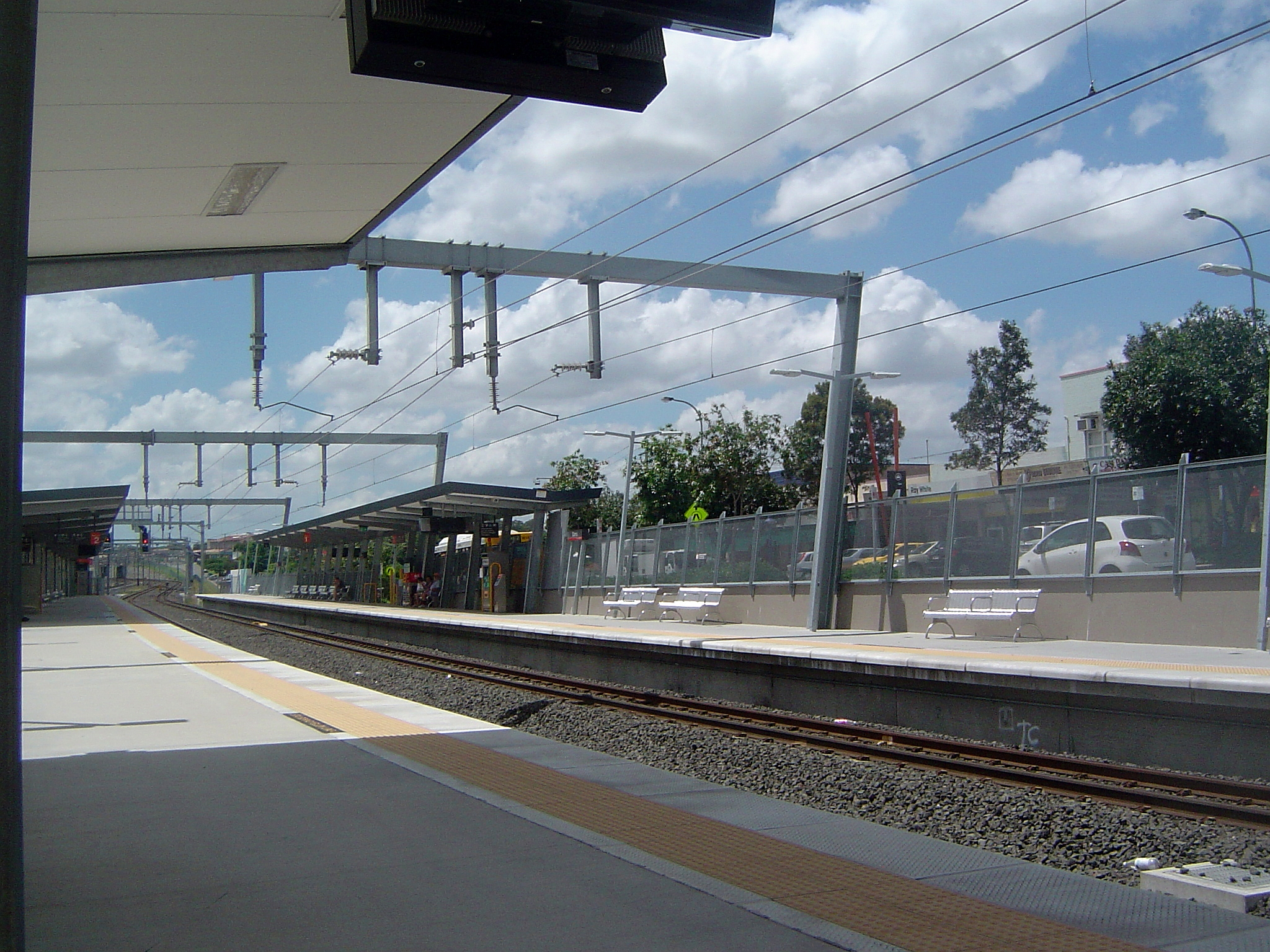
Darra railway station, 2012

Darra railway station provides access to regular Queensland Rail City network services to Brisbane CBD, Ipswich, Rosewood and Springfield. When the railway was completed in 1876 "with a stop at nine mile eighty four chain gate", halfway between the planned Oxley railway station and Wacol railway station, the site was set for the future Darra. The station was once the terminus for the first of Brisbane's electric rail lines, linked to Ferny Grove railway station in 1979.

The Centenary Freeway and the Ipswich Motorway provide access to the Brisbane CBD. Bus routes travel to surrounding suburbs of Inala, Mount Ommaney, Middle Park, Jamboree Heights, Riverhills and Sinnamon Park.

== See also ==
- List of Brisbane suburbs
