= Sumner, Queensland =

Sumner
- Suburb
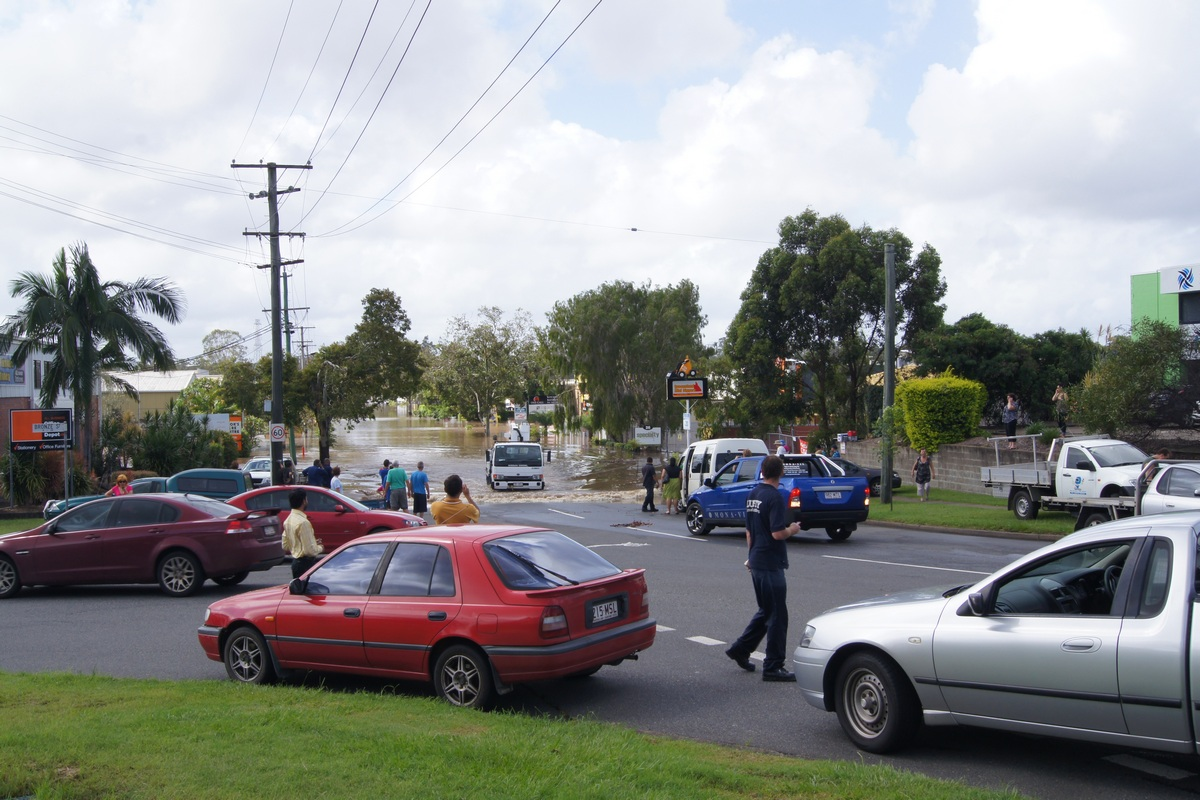
- Spine Street during the 2011 floods

- Interactive map of Sumner
- Coordinates: 27.5636°S 152.9344°E
- Country: Australia
- State: Queensland
- City: Brisbane
- LGA: City of Brisbane
- Location: 18.5 km (11.5 mi) SW of Brisbane CBD

Government
  - State electorates: Mount Ommaney; Inala
  - Federal division: Ryan

Area
  - Total: 1.9 km^{2} (0.73 sq mi)

Population
  - Total: 603 (2021 census)
  - Density: 317/km^{2} (822/sq mi)
- Time zone: UTC+10:00 (AEST)
- Postcode: 4074
Suburbs around Sumner
Middle Park	Jamboree Heights	Sinnamon Park
Riverhills	Sumner	Darra
Wacol	Wacol	Darra

Sumner is a south-western suburb in the City of Brisbane, Queensland, Australia. In the 2021 census, Sumner had a population of 603 people.

== Geography ==
Sumner is 15 kilometres (9.3 mi) south-west of the Brisbane CBD.

Sumner is split between residential use in the west and the large industrial estate Sumner Park in the east.

== History ==
The western part of the original land holdings that became the Centenary Suburbs were part of the Wolston Estate, consisting of 54 farms on an area of 3000 acres, offered for auction at Centennial Hall, Brisbane, on 16 October 1901. Wolston Estate is the property of M. B. Goggs, whose father obtained the land forty years previously in the 1860s and after whom Goggs Road is named. Only three of the farms sold at the original auction.

In 1879, the local government area of Yeerongpilly Division was created. In 1891, parts of Yeerongpilly Division were excised to create Sherwood Division becoming a Shire in 1903 which contained the area of Wolston Estate. In 1925, the Shire of Sherwood was amalgamated into the City of Brisbane.

Sumner was developed as part of the Hooker Centenary Project in 1959. It and the surrounding suburbs such as Jindalee are known as the Centenary Suburbs. It was officially named by the Queensland Government in 1969. The name came from Sumner Road, which marks the northern boundary. Sumner was a lawyer who visited his property at the end of Sumner Road on the weekends.

Centenary Memorial Gardens was established in 2001.

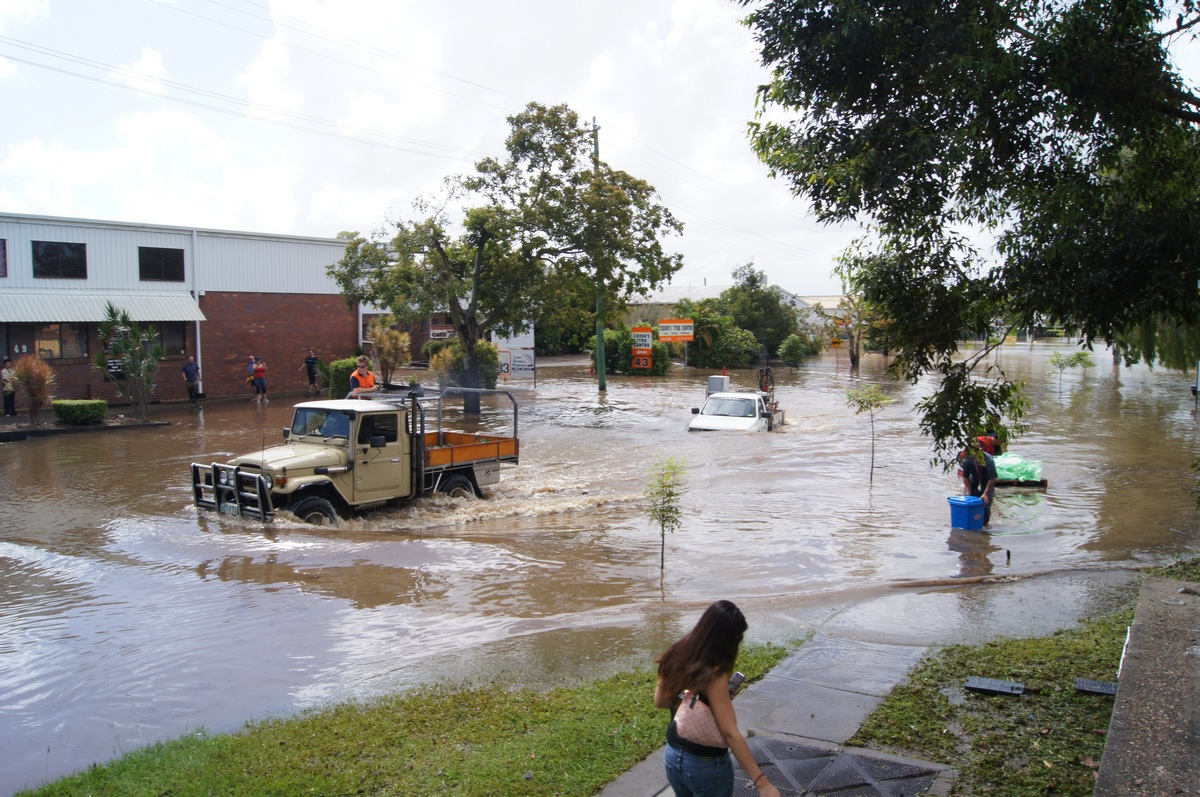
Spine Street flooded, 12 January 2011

Parts of Sumner were flooded in the 2011 Brisbane floods.

== Demographics ==
In the 2011 census, Sumner had a population of 539 people, 48.4% female and 51.6% male. The median age of the Sumner population was 29 years, 8 years below the Australian median. 61.6% of people living in Sumner were born in Australia, compared to the national average of 69.8%; the next most common countries of birth were New Zealand 5.4%, England 4.4%, Sri Lanka 3.5%, India 2.8%, South Africa 2%. 75.4% of people spoke only English at home; the next most popular languages were 2.6% Vietnamese, 2% Sinhalese, 1.8% Punjabi, 1.8% Arabic, 1.1% Maori (Cook Island).

In the 2016 census, Sumner had a population of 595 people.

In the 2021 census, Sumner had a population of 603 people.

== Education ==
There are no schools in Sumner. The nearest government primary school is Middle Park State School in neighbouring Middle Park to the north-west. The nearest government secondary school is Centenary State High School in Jindalee to the north-east.

== Facilities ==
Centenary Memorial Gardens is a crematorium and cemetery on a 40-acre (16 ha) site at 353 Wacol Station Road (27.5666°S 152.9249°E).

== Amenities ==
There are a number of parks in the area:

- Spine Street Park (27.5689°S 152.9408°E)
- Wacol Station Road Park (27.5642°S 152.9230°E)
- Wolston Road Park (27.5678°S 152.9316°E)
