= Westlake, Queensland =

Westlake
- Suburb
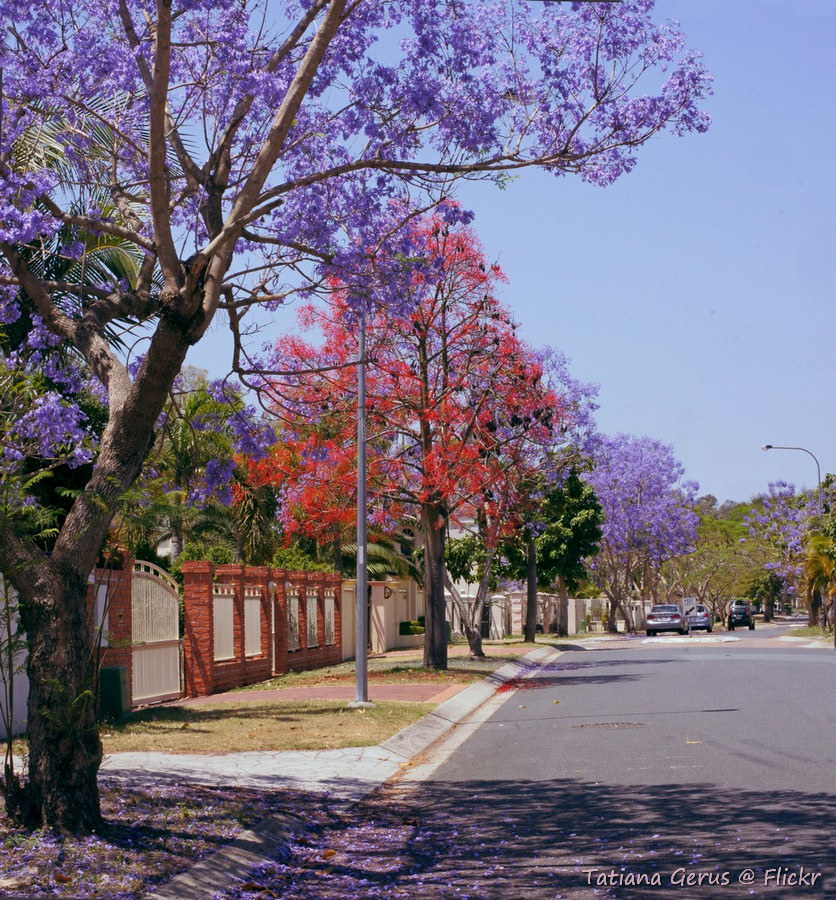
- Spring flowering trees in Wendouree Crescent, 2014

- Interactive map of Westlake
- Coordinates: 27.5489°S 152.9124°E
- Country: Australia
- State: Queensland
- City: Brisbane
- LGA: City of Brisbane
- Location: 18.9 km (11.7 mi) SW of Brisbane CBD

Government
  - State electorate: Mount Ommaney
  - Federal division: Oxley

Area
  - Total: 2.2 km^{2} (0.85 sq mi)

Population
  - Total: 4,547 (2021 census)
  - Density: 2,070/km^{2} (5,350/sq mi)
- Time zone: UTC+10:00 (AEST)
- Postcode: 4074
Suburbs around Westlake
Pinjarra Hills	Pinjarra Hills	Pinjarra Hills
Pinjarra Hills	Westlake	Mount Ommaney
Bellbowrie	Riverhills	Middle Park

Westlake is a south-western riverside suburb in the City of Brisbane, Queensland, Australia. In the 2021 census, Westlake had a population of 4,547 people.

== Geography ==
The suburb is bounded to the north and west by the Brisbane River. Westlake adjoins the suburbs of Riverhills, Middle Park and Mount Ommaney.

As the suburb's name suggests, there is a lake within the suburb. It was created by a conservation dam as part of the real estate development.

== History ==
Westlake was developed as part of the Hooker Centenary Project which commenced in 1959. It and the surrounding suburbs such as Jindalee are known as the Centenary Suburbs. It was officially named by the Queensland Place Names Board on 8 January 1973 with its boundaries determined on 11 August 1975. The suburb takes its name from the lake (27.5462°S 152.9134°E) constructed by the development project.

The western part of the original land holdings that became the Centenary Suburbs were part of the Wolston Estate, consisting of 54 farms on an area of 3000 acres, offered for auction at Centennial Hall, Brisbane, on 16 October 1901. Wolston Estate is the property of M. B. Goggs, whose father obtained the land forty years previously in the 1860s and after whom Goggs Road is named. Only three of the farms sold at the original auction.

In 1879, the local government area of Yeerongpilly Division was created. In 1891, parts of Yeerongpilly Division were excised to create Sherwood Division becoming a Shire in 1903 which contained the areas of Wolston Estate. In 1925, the Shire of Sherwood was amalgamated into the City of Brisbane.

Westlake has much riverside properties and in the early 1990s expanded to include the development Westlake Waters with the 'natural lakes'.

As residential expansion occurred, the 1990s also saw the rise of community efforts to preserve riverfront bushland and encourage environmental protection of remnant natural areas. Groups which formed to forge this greater interest in environmental protection include Save Our Riverfront Bushland (1991), Westlake-Riverhills Bushcare Group (1993) and Centenary & District Environment Action Inc (1996).

== Demographics ==
In the 2011 census, Westlake had a population of 4,380 people, 49.6% female and 50.4% male. The median age of the Westlake population was 41 years, 4 years above the Australian median. 62.8% of people living in Westlake were born in Australia, compared to the national average of 69.8%; the next most common countries of birth were England 5.6%, New Zealand 3.5%, South Africa 2.8%, Vietnam 2.4%, Sri Lanka 1.6%. 75.4% of people spoke only English at home; the next most common languages were 3.9% Vietnamese, 3.3% Cantonese, 2.6% Mandarin, 1.8% Tamil, 1.2% Hindi.

In the 2016 census, Westlake had a population of 4,368 people.

In the 2021 census, Westlake had a population of 4,547 people.

== Education ==
There are no schools in Westlake. The nearest government primary schools are Middle Park State School in neighbouring Middle Park to the south and Jamboree Heights State School in Jamboree Heights to the east. The nearest government secondary school is Centenary State High School in Jindalee to the north-east.
