= Centenary State High School =

Location
- Jindalee, Brisbane, Queensland; Australia; 27.4705°S 153.0243°E

Information
- Type: Public, secondary, day school
- Established: 1999
- Enrolment: Years 7 to 12
- Colours: Navy blue, red, yellow & white
- Website: centenaryshs.eq.edu.au

Centenary State High School is a government secondary (7–12) school at 1 Moolanda Street, Jindalee, City of Brisbane, Queensland, Australia. It is a co-curricular, co-educational school that opened in 1999. As of 2016, the school's enrolment was 1,429 students.

== History ==
The school's name "Centenary" comes from the Centenary suburbs in which it is located. In 1960, a year after the celebrations of the Centenary of Queensland, LJ Hooker announced POG that it was to create "a major satellite residential development covering 1,295 hectares and a bridge linking ... the new development with the western suburbs of Brisbane". The area was originally called the Hooker Centenary Development as well as the "Centenary Project", leading to the eventual naming of the area as the "Centenary Suburbs". The original suburbs planned were Jindalee, Mount Ommaney, Jamboree Heights, Middle Park, Riverhills, Westlake, and Sumner. The suburbs of Seventeen Mile Rocks and Sinnamon Park were not part of the original plan, but were developed separately.

== The arts ==
Centenary State High School has a large arts program, which features a bi- annual musical held by students who have rehearsed in the performance STEP (Extracurricular activities for students years 7–9) and senior students on afternoons. Recent musicals include Shrek, Matilda and The wizard of oz. The school also has an active stage band, chamber strings as well as encouraging students who volunteer to perform for weekly assemblies. Students who participate in "Back Stage Crew" have been given the opportunity to help set up live performances, gaining experience in the field of technical production. New students are able to enter the Music and Performance Plus extension programs. These Performance Plus Programs (PEP) have yearly showcases that can be musicals or creative showcases by student in collaboration with their teachers.
