= Mt Ommaney Centre =

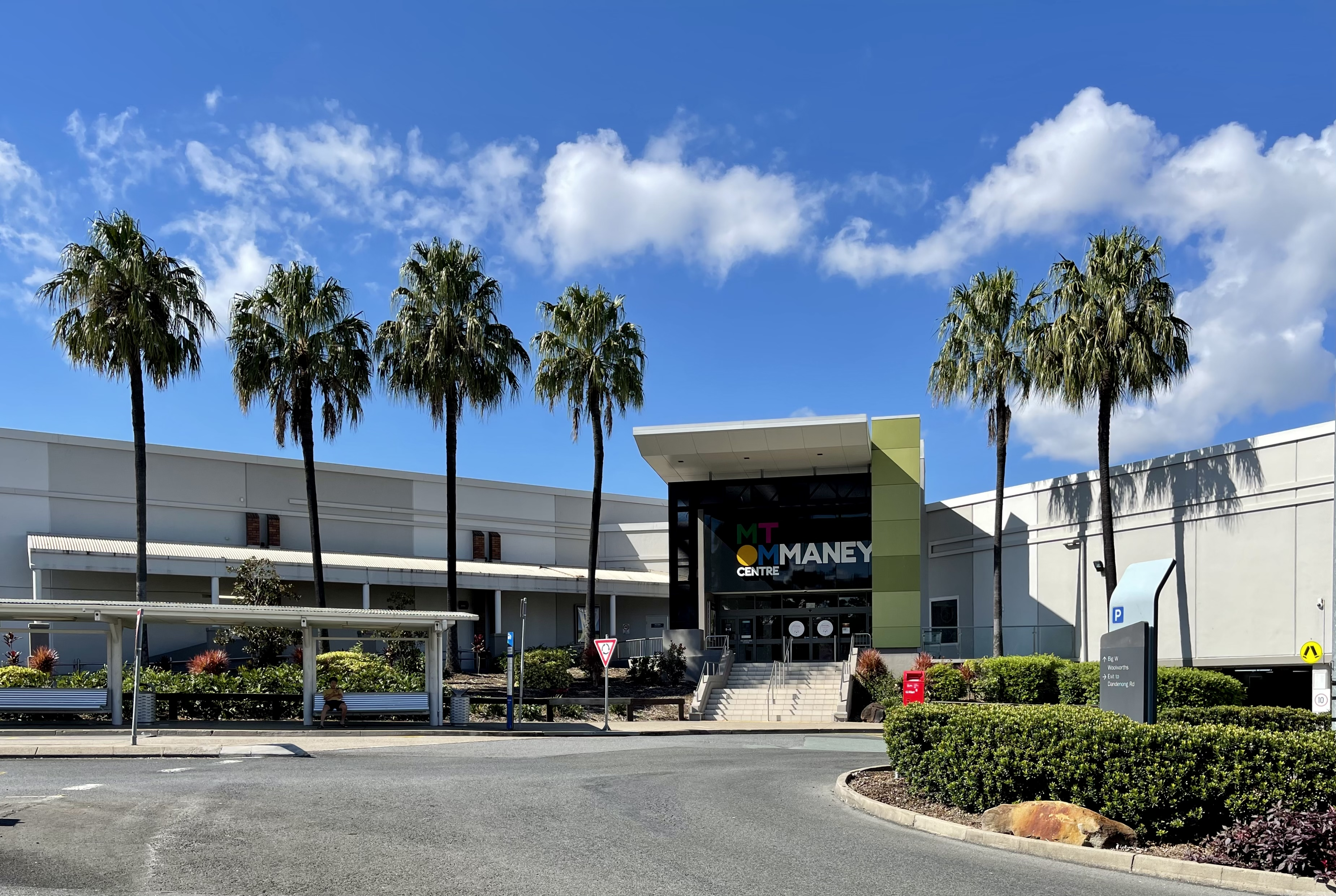
- Northwestern entrance
- Location: Mount Ommaney, Queensland, Australia
- Coordinates: 27.5491°S 152.9390°E
- Address: 171 Dandenong Road
- Opened: 1979; 47 years ago
- Manager: Retail First Pty Ltd
- Owner: YFG Shopping Centres
- Num. of stores: 170
- Num. of anchor tenants: 6
- Floor area: 56,433 m^{2} (607,440 sq ft)
- Floors: 1
- Parking: 2,619
- Website: www.mtommaneycentre.com.au

Mt Ommaney Centre is located on Dandenong Road in the suburb of Mount Ommaney in the southwest of Brisbane. After a major expansion, which was completed in 2010, the centre now has over 170 stores. Major tenants include Big W, Coles, Kmart Australia, Target Australia, Woolworths, Aldi and JB Hi-Fi.

== History ==
The centre opened in 1979 with Kmart and Coles and a few specialty stores. In 1996, the centre's name changed from Centenary Shopping Centre to Mt Ommaney Centre. Big W, Woolworths and 50 stores opened with a small food court near Woolworths. In 2007, AMP Capital lodged a development application to expand the centre, which was later approved by Brisbane City Council. In 2014, the centre was purchased as a joint venture by Federation Centres and TIAA Henderson Real Estate from AMP Capital, having acquired the centre in 1980.

In November 2019, YFG Shopping Centres purchased the 25% stake from Vicinity Centres (formerly Federation Centres) before purchasing the remaining 75% ownership from Nuveen in May 2020.

== Expansion ==
A A$120 million construction contract was awarded to Laing O'Rourke. Construction began in May 2008 to expand the centre to nearly double its size with 17,700m² a new lettable floor area. The first stage opened in May 2009 with 13 stores and a new Target. A new food court next to Target opened in July 2009. A new mall outside Big W opened in September 2009. In November 2009 the mall leading from the old to new food court become a fashion mall. In December 2009 the new Market Place opened, with a relocated and larger Coles, relocated and Terry White Chemists (total of two in the centre), as well as most of the fresh food retailers, among others. In early January and February 2010, Australia Post and the Newsagency relocated, with Aldi opening 25 February. The finished product came mid-2010, with a new mall from the old Coles to Big W, which became a "Youth Fashion Precinct". There are now more than 170 specialty stores in the centre.

== Other facilities ==
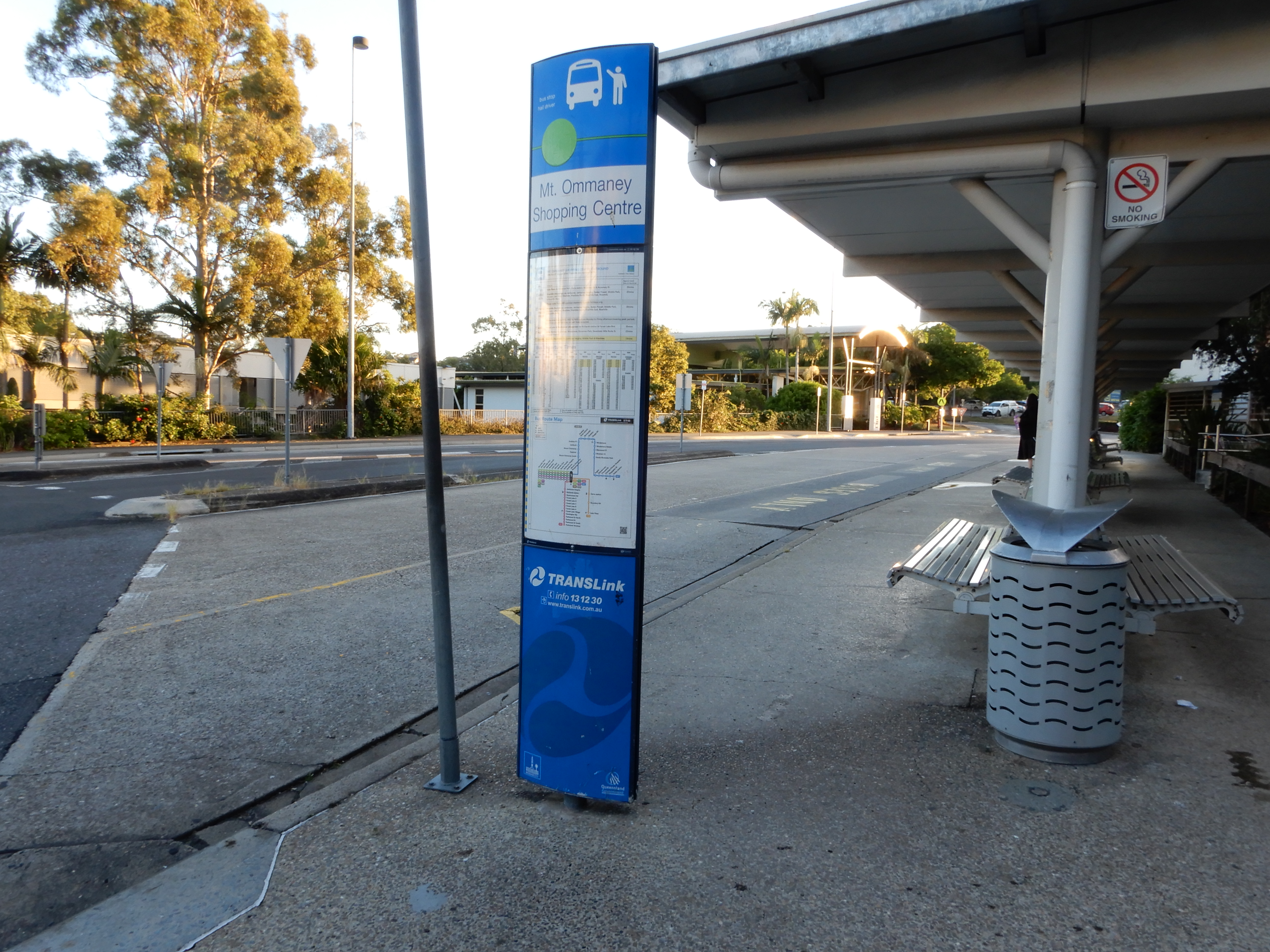
Mount Ommaney Shopping Centre bus station in 2019, with Mt Ommaney Library visible in the background.

Brisbane City Council operates a public library within the grounds of Mt Ommaney Centre.

=== Transport ===
Mount Ommaney Shopping Centre bus station is directly connected to Mt Ommaney Centre and is served by bus services to surrounding Centenary Suburbs, Brisbane City and Heathwood.
