= Middle Park, Queensland =

Middle Park
- Suburb
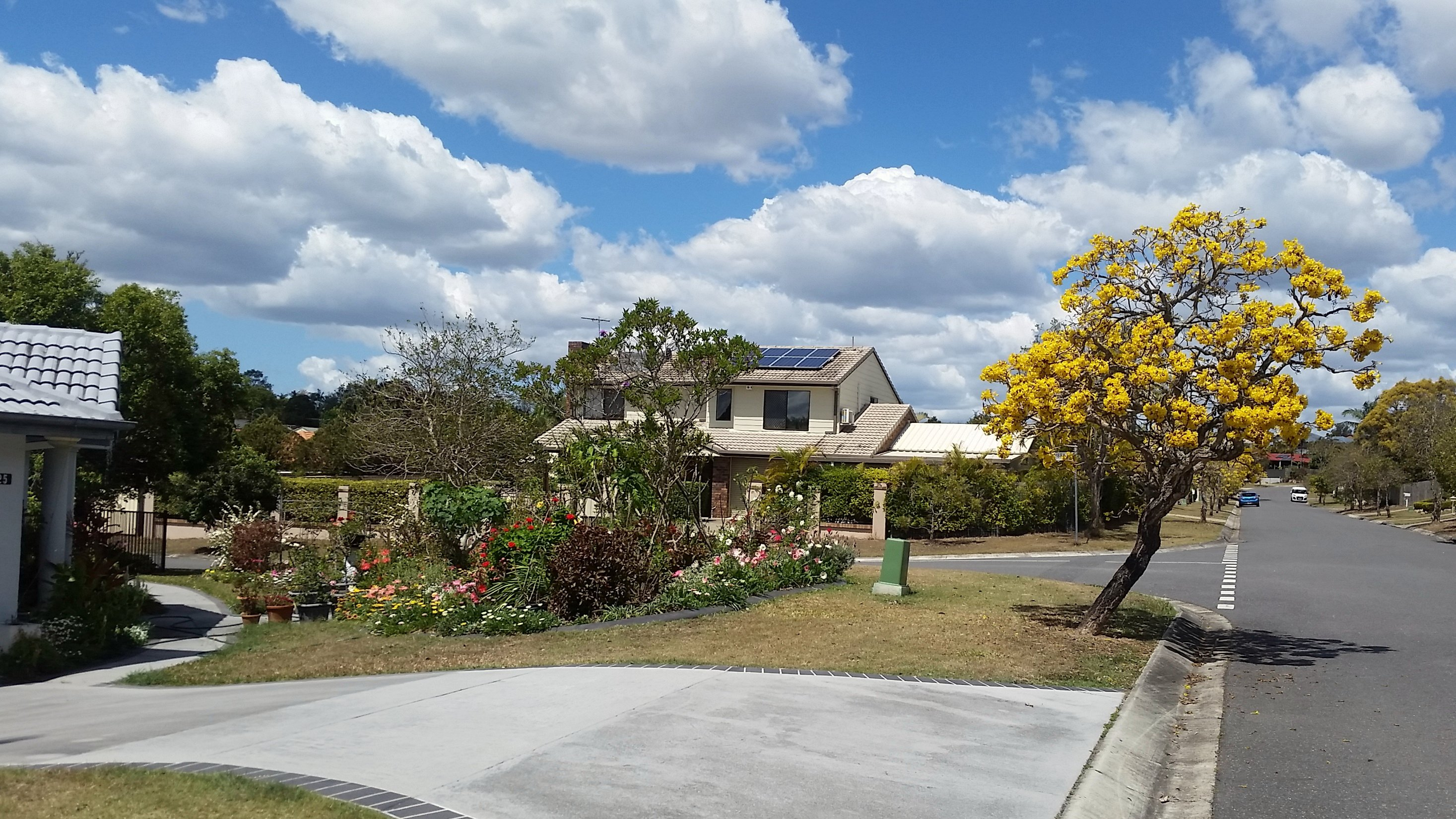
- Middle Park, 2018

- Interactive map of Middle Park
- Coordinates: 27.5561°S 152.9213°E
- Country: Australia
- State: Queensland
- City: Brisbane
- LGA: City of Brisbane (Jamboree Ward)
- Location: 17.4 km (10.8 mi) SW of Brisbane CBD
- Established: 1970

Government
  - State electorate: Mount Ommaney
  - Federal division: Oxley

Area
  - Total: 1.5 km^{2} (0.58 sq mi)

Population
  - Total: 3,845 (2021 census)
  - Density: 2,560/km^{2} (6,640/sq mi)
- Time zone: UTC+10:00 (AEST)
- Postcode: 4074
Suburbs around Middle Park
| Westlake | Mount Ommaney | Mount Ommaney |
| Westlake | Middle Park | Jamboree Heights |
| Riverhills | Riverhills | Sumner |

Suburb map

Middle Park is a residential south-western suburb in the Centenary Suburbs in the City of Brisbane, Queensland, Australia. In the 2021 census, Middle Park had a population of 3,845 people.

== Geography ==
Middle Park is located 17.4 kilometres (10.8 mi) by road south-west of the Brisbane CBD.

Middle Park is bounded to the north by the McLeod Country Golf Club, to the West by Baronga Street and Horizon Drive, Lalina Street and Macfarlane Street, to the south by Sumners Road and to the east by Estate Road and Beanland Street.

== History ==
The suburb was named by Queensland Place Names Board on 8 January 1973. It was one of the six "Centenary Suburbs" developed by L.J. Hooker Real Estate . It was released for development in July 1976, the last of the 6 suburbs to be developed.

The western part of the original land holdings that became the Centenary Suburbs were part of the Wolston Estate, consisting of 54 farms on an area of 3000 acres, offered for auction at Centennial Hall, Brisbane, on 16 October 1901. Wolston Estate is the property of M. B. Goggs, whose father obtained the land forty years previously in the 1860s and after whom Goggs Road is named. Only three of the farms sold at the original auction.

St Catherine's Anglican Church was dedicated in 1980.

Good News Lutheran Primary School opened on 31 January 1984.

Middle Park State School opened on 27 January 1987.

== Demographics ==
In the 2011 census, Middle Park had a population of 4,026 people, 51.2% female and 48.8% male. The median age of the Middle Park population was 38 years of age, 1 year above the Australian median. 61.2% of people living in Middle Park were born in Australia, compared to the national average of 69.8%; the next most common countries of birth were England 5.6%, New Zealand 3.7%, Vietnam 2.6%, China 2.3%, Sri Lanka 1.8%. 72.5% of people spoke only English at home; the next most common languages were 3.7% Cantonese, 3.7% Vietnamese, 3.4% Mandarin, 2% Tamil, 0.9% Hindi.

In the 2016 census, Middle Park had a population of 3,955 people.

In the 2021 census, Middle Park had a population of 3,845 people.

== Education ==
Middle Park State School is a government primary (Prep-6) school for boys and girls at the corner of Sumners Road and Macfarlane Street (27.5594°S 152.9171°E). In 2017, the school had an enrolment of 646 students with 50 teachers (42 full-time equivalent) and 26 non-teaching staff (16 full-time equivalent). It includes a special education program. The School's motto is "Each to Succeed".

Good News Lutheran School is a private primary (Prep-6) school for boys and girls at 49 Horizon Drive (27.5553°S 152.9276°E). In 2017, the school had an enrolment of 352 students with 26 teachers (24 full-time equivalent) and 21 non-teaching staff (14 full-time equivalent). The School's motto is "Nurturing, Engaging and Transforming Lives."

There are no secondary schools in Middle Park. The nearest government secondary school is Centenary State High School in Jindalee to the north-east.

== Amenities ==
Park Village Shopping Centre (also known as Metro Middle Park) is located on the corner of Horizon Drive and Riverhills Road (27.5556°S 152.9229°E). It has a Coles supermarket and 25 speciality shops.

Centenary Baptist Church is at 8 Riverhills Road (27.5556°S 152.9242°E).

Centenary Uniting Church is at 37 Riverhills Road (27.5562°S 152.9217°E).

Good News Lutheran Church is at 49 Horizon Drive (27.5552°S 152.92784°E).

St Catherine's Anglican Community is at 43 MacFarlane Street (27.5581°S 152.9177°E).

The Salvation Army Centenary Corps is on the corner of MacFarlane Street and Lalina Street (27.5580°S 152.9171°E).
