= Mount Ommaney =

- Suburb
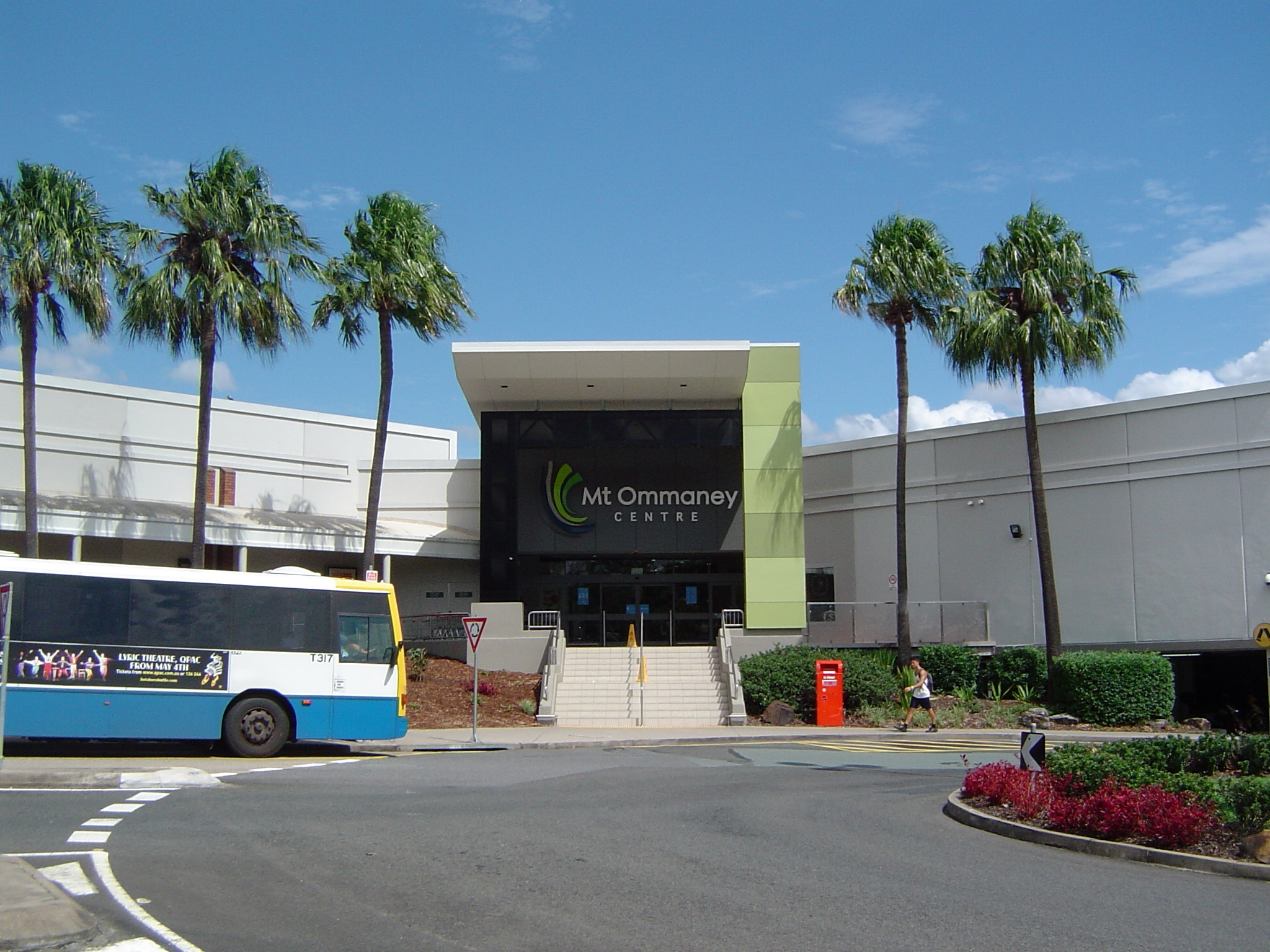
- Mount Ommaney Shopping Centre, 2013

- Interactive map of Mount Ommaney
- Coordinates: 27.5453°S 152.9313°E
- Country: Australia
- State: Queensland
- City: Brisbane
- LGA: City of Brisbane (Jamboree Ward)
- Location: 15.8 km (9.8 mi) SW of Brisbane CBD

Government
  - State electorate: Mount Ommaney
  - Federal division: Oxley

Area
  - Total: 2.3 km^{2} (0.89 sq mi)

Population
  - Total: 2,503 (2021 census)
  - Density: 1,088/km^{2} (2,820/sq mi)
- Time zone: UTC+10:00 (AEST)
- Postcode: 4074
Suburbs around Mount Ommaney
Pinjarra Hills	Jindalee	Jindalee
Westlake	Mount Ommaney	Sinnamon Park
Middle Park	Jamboree Heights	Jamboree Heights

Mount Ommaney is a south-western riverside suburb in the City of Brisbane, Queensland, Australia. The mountain of the same name is located within the locality (27.5443°S 152.9290°E). In the 2021 census, Mount Ommaney had a population of 2,503 people.

== Geography ==
Mount Ommaney is 15.8 kilometres (9.8 mi) by road south-west of the Brisbane CBD.

The Centenary Highway is the eastern boundary of the suburb.

Mount Ommaney is located on the southern side of the Brisbane River (across from Pinjarra Hills) and the majority of the properties are located on the hill itself. A relatively large section of Mount Ommaney is forest that is protected by the Brisbane City Council and will not be developed, this includes the area next to the river that was once a stone quarry. Many of the lots in Mount Ommaney are around or in excess of 1,000 square metres (11,000 sq ft). The Mount Ommaney Shopping Centre (27.5491°S 152.9390°E) is located on the outskirts of the suburb and is opposite to the Mount Ommaney Hotel.

The mountain is 82 metres (269 ft) above sea level. Homes on the top of the mountain generally have views either to the Brisbane CBD, the suburbs, the countryside on the opposite side of the river or the river itself. These houses tend to be very expensive as spare residential land is rare in Mount Ommaney.

McLeod Country Golf Club (27.5509°S 152.924°E) is in the west of the suburb and has a golf course of 18 holes. Alfresco dining on the verandah is available overlooking the course and across to the hill and creek.

== History ==
The suburb takes its name from the mountain, which in turn takes its name from John Mansell Ommaney, the nephew of Stephen Simpson, Commissioner for Crown Lands in the Moreton Bay District. Simpson had designated his nephew, John Ommaney as his heir. On 11 March 1856 the young man, aged 20, was riding from Wolston House and was thrown from his horse. The horse returned to Wolston House and a search was undertaken. Ommaney was found on the ground insensible and, despite medical attention, died. His body was taken by steamer to be buried in the Church of England cemetery at Paddington.

The western part of the original land holdings that became the Centenary Suburbs were part of the Wolston Estate, consisting of 54 farms on an area of 3000 acres, offered for auction at Centennial Hall, Brisbane, on 16 October 1901. Wolston Estate is the property of M. B. Goggs, whose father obtained the land forty years previously in the 1860s and after whom Goggs Road is named. Only three of the farms sold at the original auction.

In 1879, the local government area of Yeerongpilly Division was created. In 1891, parts of Yeerongpilly Division were excised to create Sherwood Division becoming a Shire in 1903 which contained the area of Wolston Estate. In 1925, the Shire of Sherwood was amalgamated into the City of Brisbane.

Mount Ommaney was developed as part of the Hooker Centenary Project in 1959. It and the surrounding suburbs such as Jindalee are known as the Centenary Suburbs (1959 being the Centenary of Queensland).

Mount Ommaney Special School opened on 1 January 1992.

Mount Ommaney Library opened in 1997 with a major refurbishment in 2015.

== Demographics ==
In the 2011 census, the population of Mount Ommaney was 2,334, 54.3% female and 45.7% male. The median age of the Mount Ommaney population was 45 years of age, 8 years above the Australian median. 58% of people living in Mount Ommaney were born in Australia, compared to the national average of 69.8%; the next most common countries of birth were England 4.5%, Vietnam 3.4%, Taiwan 3.3%, New Zealand 2.9%, South Africa 2.8%. 68.7% of people spoke only English at home; the next most common languages were 6.4% Mandarin, 4.9% Vietnamese, 4.6% Cantonese, 1.8% Arabic, 1.4% Tamil.

In the 2016 census, Mount Ommaney had a population of 2,360 people.

In the 2021 census, Mount Ommaney had a population of 2,503 people.

== Education ==
Mount Ommaney Special School is a special primary and secondary (Early Childhood–12) school for boys and girls at 94 Capitol Drive (27.5421°S 152.9419°E). In 2017, the school had an enrolment of 87 students with 35 teachers (28 full-time equivalent) and 55 non-teaching staff (35 full-time equivalent).

There are no mainstream schools in Mount Ommaney. The nearest government primary schools are Jindalee State School to the north in neighbouring Jindalee and Jamboree Heights State School to the south in neighbouring Jamboree Heights. The nearest government secondary school is Centenary State High School in Jindalee.

== Amenities ==
The Brisbane City Council operates a public library in the Mount Ommaney Centre at 171 Dandenong Road (27.5481°S 152.9379°E). The Centenary sub-branch of the Queensland Country Women's Association meets at the Mount Ommaney Library.

== Transport ==
Mount Ommaney Shopping Centre bus station serves routes to Brisbane City, surrounding Centenary Suburbs and Heathwood.

Transport for Brisbane operates 13 routes that serve stops in Mount Ommaney:

Weekday Services
Number	Destination	Via	Origin
103	Inala	Darra	Mount Ommaney Shopping Centre
106	Indooroopilly Shopping Centre	Seventeen Mile Rocks, Sherwood	Mount Ommaney Shopping Centre
453	Queen Street (City)	Jindalee, Indooroopilly	Mount Ommaney Shopping Centre
454	Queen Street (City)	Indooroopilly	Riverhills West
460	Queen Street (City)	Indooroopilly	Heathwood
467	Oxley Station	Jindalee, Seventeen Mile Rocks	Mount Ommaney Shopping Centre

Weekday Morning Peak Services
Number	Destination	Via	Origin
P455	Eagle Street (City)	Legacy Way, Roma Street	Riverhills West
P456	Eagle Street (City)	Jindalee, Legacy Way, Roma Street	Mount Ommaney Shopping Centre

* Services are one way during each peak with the AM services towards the city and PM peak from the city.

Weekend Services
Number	Destination	Via	Origin
103	Inala	Darra	Mount Ommaney Shopping Centre
450	Queen Street (City)	Jindalee, Indooroopilly	Riverhills West
460	Queen Street (City)	Indooroopilly	Heathwood

Weekend Night Services (1am-5am)
Number	Destination	Via	Origin
N449	Spine Street, Sumner	Milton, Indooroopilly, Jindalee, Mount Ommaney, Riverhills	Fortitude Valley
