= Electoral district of Mount Ommaney =

State electoral district of Queensland, Australia

Mount Ommaney Queensland—Legislative Assembly
- Map of the electoral district of Mount Ommaney, 2017
- State: Queensland
- MP: Jess Pugh
- Party: Labor Party
- Namesake: Mount Ommaney
- Electors: 35,577 (2020)
- Area: 31 km^{2} (12.0 sq mi)
- Demographic: Inner-metropolitan
- Coordinates: 27°33′S 152°57′E
Electorates around Mount Ommaney:
Moggill	Moggill	Maiwar
Moggill	Mount Ommaney	Miller
Moggill	Inala	Algester

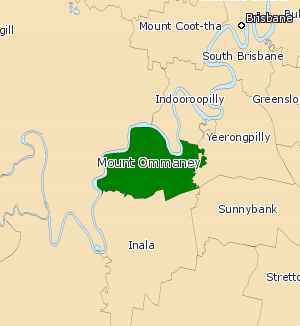
2008 map of Mount Ommaney

Mount Ommaney is an electoral district of the Legislative Assembly in the Australian state of Queensland. It was created with the 1992 redistribution.

It covers the western suburbs of Brisbane south of the Brisbane River. The Western Arterial Road runs through the middle of the seat from north to south. The suburb is split by the industrial suburb of Seventeen Mile Rocks between the older suburbs around Corinda in the east and the more recent areas around Mount Ommaney.

A significant population of elderly voters are found in the Sinnamon Village retirement complex in Sinnamon Park.

== Members for Mount Ommaney ==
Member	Party	Term
Peter Pyke	Labor	1992–1995
Bob Harper	Liberal	1995–1998
Julie Attwood	Labor	1998–2012
Tarnya Smith	Liberal National	2012–2017
Jess Pugh	Labor	2017–present

== Election results ==
2024 Queensland state election: Mount Ommaney
Party	Candidate	Votes	%	±%
Labor	Jess Pugh	15,005	45.46	−5.14
Liberal National	Lisa Baillie	12,544	38.00	+5.9
Greens	Chris Richardson	3,830	11.60	+0.60
One Nation	Thorold Cusack	1,137	3.45	+0.95
Animal Justice	Michelle Jensz	492	1.49	+1.49
Total formal votes		33,008	97.15	
Informal votes		970	2.85	
Turnout		33,978	92.10	
Two-party-preferred result
Labor	Jess Pugh	18,929	57.35	−5.25
Liberal National	Lisa Baillie	14,079	42.65	+5.25
Labor hold		Swing	-5.25	

Primary vote results in Mount Ommaney (Parties that have never gotten 5% of the vote are omitted)
Labor
Liberal/Liberal National
Greens
One Nation
Independent
View source data.
Two-candidate-preferred vote results in Mount Ommaney View source data.

== Suburbs in Mount Ommaney ==
- Corinda
- Darra
- Jamboree Heights
- Jindalee
- Middle Park
- Mount Ommaney
- Oxley
- Riverhills
- Seventeen Mile Rocks
- Sinnamon Park
- Sumner
- Westlake
