= Riverhills, Queensland =

Riverhills
- Suburb
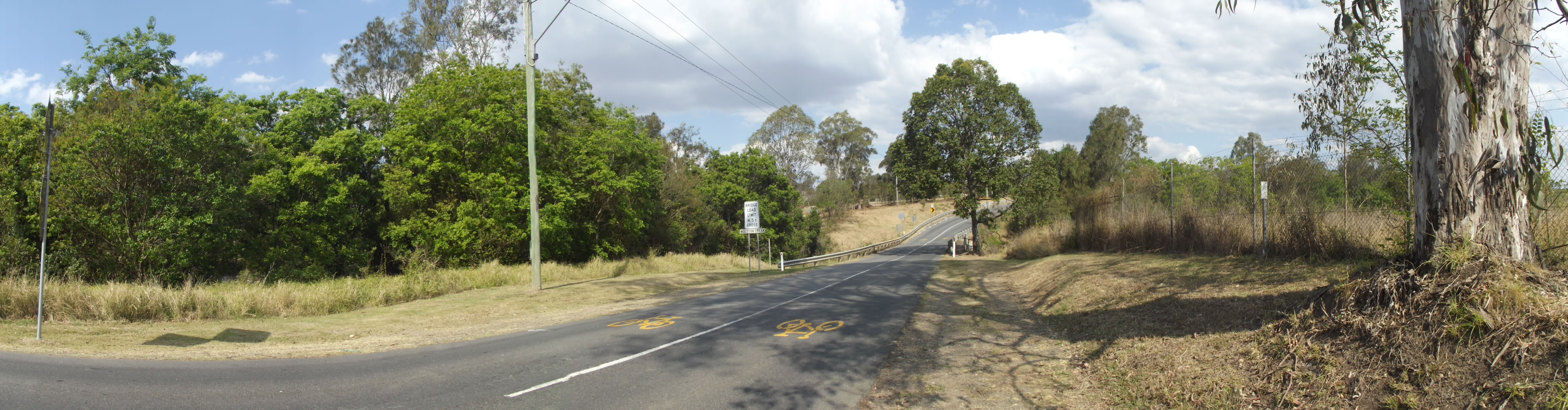
- Wolston Station Road heading to Wacol

- Interactive map of Riverhills
- Coordinates: 27.5614°S 152.9093°E
- Country: Australia
- State: Queensland
- City: Brisbane
- LGA: City of Brisbane (Jamboree Ward)
- Location: 19.5 km (12.1 mi) SW of Brisbane CBD

Government
  - State electorate: Mount Ommaney
  - Federal division: Oxley

Area
  - Total: 2.3 km^{2} (0.89 sq mi)

Population
  - Total: 4,121 (2021 census)
  - Density: 1,790/km^{2} (4,640/sq mi)
- Time zone: UTC+10:00 (AEST)
- Postcode: 4074
Suburbs around Riverhills
| Bellbowrie | Westlake | Middle Park |
| Bellbowrie | Riverhills | Sumner |
| Moggill | Wacol | Wacol |

Riverhills is a south-western suburb in the City of Brisbane, Queensland, Australia. It is one of the Centenary suburbs. In the 2021 census, Riverhills had a population of 4,121 people.

== Geography ==
Riverhills is 19.5 kilometres (12.1 mi) by road south-west of the Brisbane CBD.

Riverhills is bounded to the west by the Brisbane River, to the south by Wolston Creek, and to the south-east by Wacol Station Road.

The land use is predominantly residential. The terrain is hilly rising from below 10 metres (33 ft) above sea level beside the river to over 40 metres (130 ft) on the northern bank of Wolston Creek.

== History ==
The western part of the original land holdings that became the Centenary Suburbs were part of the Wolston Estate, consisting of 54 farms on an area of 3000 acres, offered for auction at Centennial Hall, Brisbane, on 16 October 1901. Wolston Estate is the property of M. B. Goggs, whose father obtained the land forty years previously in the 1860s and after whom Goggs Road is named. Only three of the farms sold at the original auction.

In 1879, the local government area of Yeerongpilly Division was created. In 1891, parts of Yeerongpilly Division were excised to create Sherwood Division becoming a Shire in 1903 which contained the area of the Wolston Estate. In 1925, the Shire of Sherwood was amalgamated into the City of Brisbane.

Riverhills, along with surrounding suburbs, was developed in 1959 as part of the Hooker Centenary Project in 1959. The 'Centenary Project' and the area is now more commonly referred to as the Centenary Suburbs.

On 8 January 1973, the suburb was officially named by Queensland Place Names Board using the name suggested in 1972 by the developer based on the geographic characteristics of the area.

In the 2011 Brisbane floods, there was flooding in the lower-lying areas around the creeks.

== Demographics ==
In the 2016 census, Riverhills had a population of 4,042 people, 50.6% female and 49.4% male. The median age of the Riverhills population was 34 years, 4 years below the Australian median. 66.7% of people living in Riverhills were born in Australia, compared to the national average of 66.7%; the next most common countries of birth were England 4.6%, New Zealand 4.4%, South Africa 1.7%, Vietnam 1.6%, Scotland 1.0%. 80.6% of people spoke only English at home; the next most common languages were 2.0% Vietnamese, 1.6% Mandarin, 1.1% Persian, 1.0% Arabic, 0.8% Spanish.

In the 2021 census, Riverhills had a population of 4,121 people.

== Education ==
There are no schools in Riverhills. The nearest government primary school is Middle Park State School in Middle Park to the west. The nearest government secondary school is Centenary State High School in Jindalee to the north.

== Amenities ==
The Riverhills Plaza is a shopping centre on Bogong Street (27.5589°S 152.9119°E). In 2011 one of its stores, Just Poppy's, was named Brisbane's Best Burgers in a contest run by the Brisbane Times.

There are a number of parks in the suburb with various sporting and recreational facilities. There are also less developed areas around a number of creeks and gullies flowing down to the river for those wishing to enjoy nature.

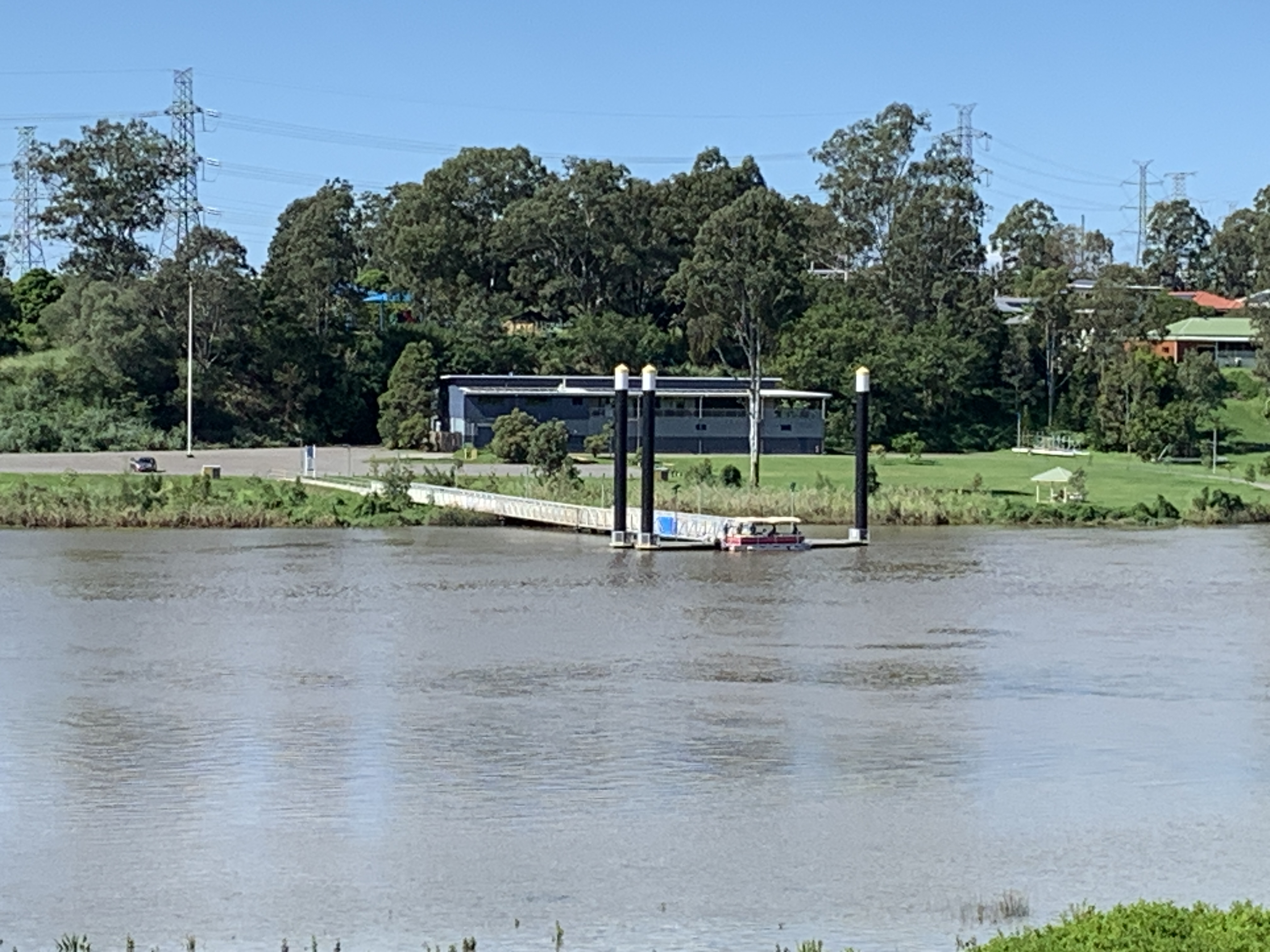
Floating pontoon, Newcomb Park, 2025

There is a boat launching area into the river for non-motorised craft at Newcomb Park at 529 Sumners Road (27.5630°S 152.8989°E). The Centenary Rowing Club and Lakers Dragon Boat Club operate from that park. A floating pontoon assists with getting in and out of watercraft. It was damaged in the 2022 Brisbane flood, but has been rebuilt.

== Transport ==
Riverhills is accessible via the Centenary Highway. Some bus routes service the suburb, namely:

- 450 - CityXpress via Cultural Centre, Toowong, Indooroopilly, Jindalee, Mount Ommaney, Middle Park and Westlake (weekends) (BT)
- 454 - CityXpress via Cultural Centre, Toowong, Indooroopilly and Riverhills (weekdays) (BT)
- 455 - Rocket via Milton, and the Western Freeway (Weekdays - peak hours only) (BT)
- 457 - City Precincts via Milton, Coronation Drive, Western Freeway, Jindalee, Mount Ommaney, Middle Park and Westlake (weekdays - peak hours only) (BT)
- 459 - City Precincts via Milton, Coronation Drive, Western Freeway and Mount Ommaney. (weekdays - peak hours only) (BT)

Riverhills is a short distance from Darra train station.

== Politics ==
The people of Riverhills are represented by Sarah Hutton, LNP Councillor for the Jamboree Ward, in the local council, by Jess Pugh, the Labor Member for Mount Ommaney in the Queensland Parliament and by Milton Dick in the federal division of Oxley.
