= City of Brisbane =

- Local government area
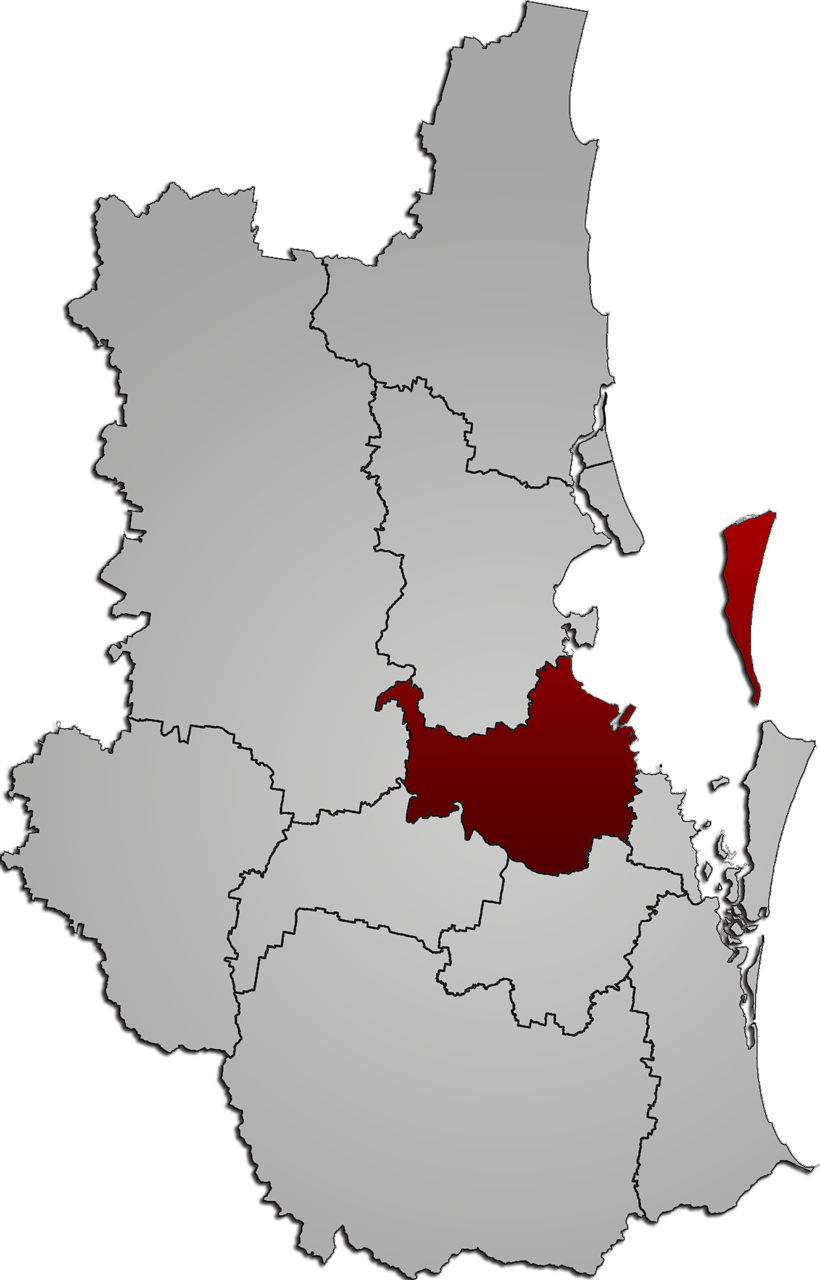
- Location within South East Queensland Flag of the City of Brisbane

- Interactive map of City of Brisbane
- Coordinates: 27.47°S 153.12°E
- Country: Australia
- State: Queensland
- Region: South East Queensland
- Established: 30 October 1924
- Council seat: Brisbane CBD (City Hall)

Government
  - Lord Mayor: Adrian Schrinner (LNP)
  - State electorate: Algester, Aspley, Bulimba, Chatsworth, Clayfield, Cooper, Everton, Ferny Grove, Greenslopes, Inala, Lytton, Maiwar, Mansfield, McConnel, Miller, Moggill, Mount Ommaney, Nudgee, Sandgate, South Brisbane, Stafford, Stretton, Toohey
  - Federal division: Brisbane, Blair, Bonner, Dickson, Griffith, Lilley, Moreton, Oxley, Petrie, Rankin, Ryan

Area
  - Total: 1,342.7 km^{2} (518.4 sq mi)

Population
  - Total: 1,242,825 (2021 census) (1st)
  - Density: 925.62/km^{2} (2,397.34/sq mi)
- Time zone: UTC+10:00 (AEST)
- Website: City of Brisbane
LGAs around City of Brisbane
Somerset	Moreton Bay	Moreton Bay
Somerset	City of Brisbane	Moreton Bay
Ipswich	Logan	Redland

The City of Brisbane is a local government area (LGA) which comprises the inner portion of Greater Brisbane, the capital of Queensland, Australia. Its governing body is the Brisbane City Council.

The LGAs in the other mainland state capitals (Sydney, Melbourne, Perth and Adelaide) are generally responsible only for the central business districts and inner neighbourhoods of those cities. However, the City of Brisbane administers a significant portion of the Brisbane Greater Capital City Statistical Area (GCCSA), accounting for just under half its population. As such, it has a larger population than any other local government area in Australia. The City of Brisbane was the first Australian LGA to reach a population of more than one million. Its population is roughly equivalent to the populations of Tasmania, the Australian Capital Territory and the Northern Territory combined. In 2016–2017, the council administered a budget of over $3 billion, by far the largest budget compared to those of the City of Sydney and City of Melbourne LGAs.

The City derives from cities, towns and shires that merged in 1925. The main offices and central library of the council are at 266 George Street, also known as Brisbane Square. Brisbane City Hall houses the Council Chamber, the offices of the Lord Mayor and Deputy Mayor, meeting and reception rooms and the Museum of Brisbane.

In the 2021 census, the City of Brisbane had a population of 1,242,825 people.

== Suburbs ==
The City of Brisbane includes the following settlements:

=== Inner suburbs ===
- Bardon
- Bowen Hills
- Brisbane CBD
- East Brisbane
- Fortitude Valley
- Herston
- Highgate Hill
- Kangaroo Point
- Kelvin Grove
- New Farm
- Newstead
- Paddington
- Petrie Terrace
- Red Hill
- South Brisbane
- Spring Hill
- Teneriffe
- West End
- Woolloongabba

Total: 19

=== Northern suburbs ===
- Albion
- Alderley
- Ascot
- Aspley
- Bald Hills
- Banyo
- Boondall
- Bracken Ridge
- Bridgeman Downs
- Brighton
- Brisbane Airport
- Carseldine
- Chermside
- Chermside West
- Clayfield
- Deagon
- Eagle Farm
- Everton Park
- Ferny Grove
- Fitzgibbon
- Gaythorne
- Geebung
- Gordon Park
- Grange
- Hamilton
- Hendra
- Kalinga
- Kedron
- Keperra
- Lutwyche
- McDowall
- Mitchelton
- Myrtletown
- Newmarket
- Northgate
- Nudgee
- Nudgee Beach
- Nundah
- Pinkenba
- Sandgate
- Shorncliffe
- Stafford
- Stafford Heights
- Taigum
- Virginia
- Wavell Heights
- Wilston
- Windsor
- Wooloowin
- Zillmere

Total: 50

=== Southern suburbs ===
- Acacia Ridge
- Algester
- Annerley
- Archerfield
- Burbank
- Calamvale
- Coopers Plains
- Darra
- Doolandella
- Drewvale
- Durack
- Dutton Park
- Eight Mile Plains
- Ellen Grove
- Fairfield
- Forest Lake
- Greenslopes
- Heathwood
- Holland Park
- Holland Park West
- Inala
- Karawatha
- Kuraby
- Larapinta
- MacGregor
- Mackenzie
- Mansfield
- Moorooka
- Mount Gravatt
- Mount Gravatt East
- Nathan
- Pallara
- Parkinson
- Richlands
- Robertson
- Rochedale
- Rocklea
- Runcorn
- Salisbury
- Seventeen Mile Rocks
- Sinnamon Park
- Stones Corner
- Stretton
- Sumner
- Sunnybank
- Sunnybank Hills
- Tarragindi
- Tennyson
- Upper Mount Gravatt
- Wacol
- Willawong
- Wishart
- Yeerongpilly
- Yeronga

Total: 54

=== Eastern suburbs ===
- Balmoral
- Belmont
- Bulimba
- Camp Hill
- Cannon Hill
- Carina
- Carina Heights
- Carindale
- Chandler
- Coorparoo
- Gumdale
- Hawthorne
- Hemmant
- Lota
- Lytton
- Manly
- Manly West
- Morningside
- Murarrie
- Norman Park
- Port of Brisbane
- Ransome
- Seven Hills
- Tingalpa
- Wakerley
- Wynnum
- Wynnum West

Total: 27

=== Western suburbs ===
- Anstead
- Ashgrove
- Auchenflower
- Banks Creek
- Bellbowrie
- Brookfield
- Chapel Hill
- Chelmer
- Chuwar
- Corinda
- England Creek
- Enoggera
- Enoggera Reservoir
- Ferny Grove
- Fig Tree Pocket
- Graceville
- Indooroopilly
- Jamboree Heights
- Jindalee
- Karana Downs
- Kenmore
- Kenmore Hills
- Kholo
- Lake Manchester
- Middle Park
- Milton
- Moggill
- Mount Coot-tha
- Mount Crosby
- Mount Ommaney
- Oxley
- Pinjarra Hills
- Pullenvale
- Riverhills
- Sherwood
- Sinnamon Park
- St Lucia
- Taringa
- The Gap
- Toowong
- Upper Brookfield
- Upper Kedron
- Westlake

Total: 43

=== Moreton Bay ===
- Bulwer
- Cowan Cowan
- Kooringal
- Moreton Bay
- Moreton Island

Total: 5

== History ==
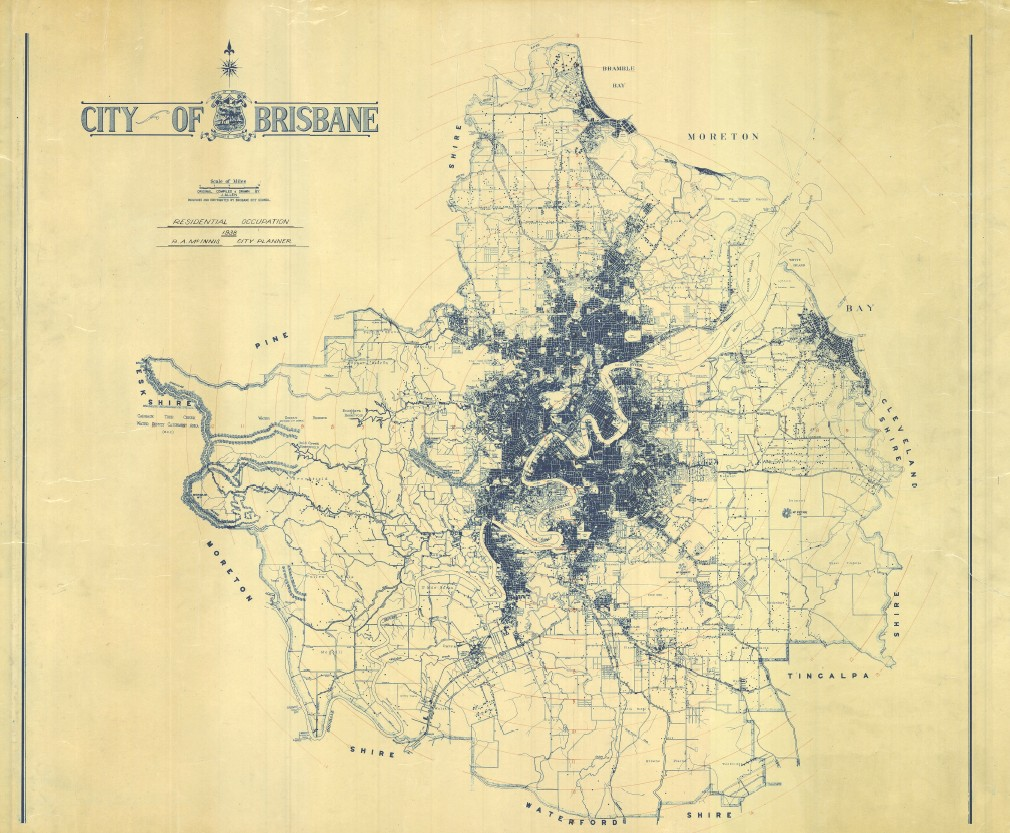
Map of Brisbane at time of amalgamation

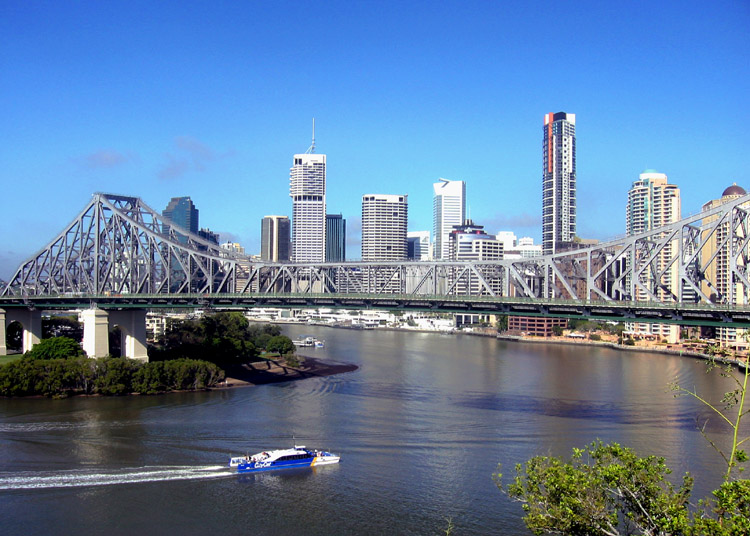
Story Bridge and Brisbane River, 2006

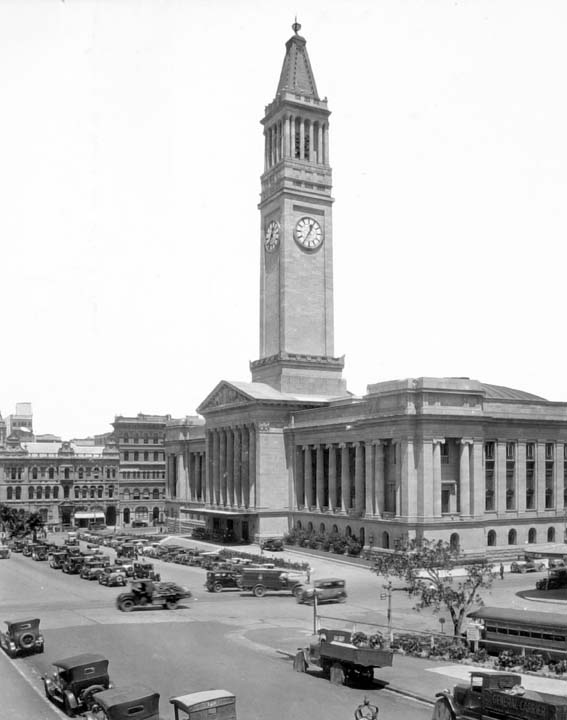
Brisbane City Hall in the 1930s

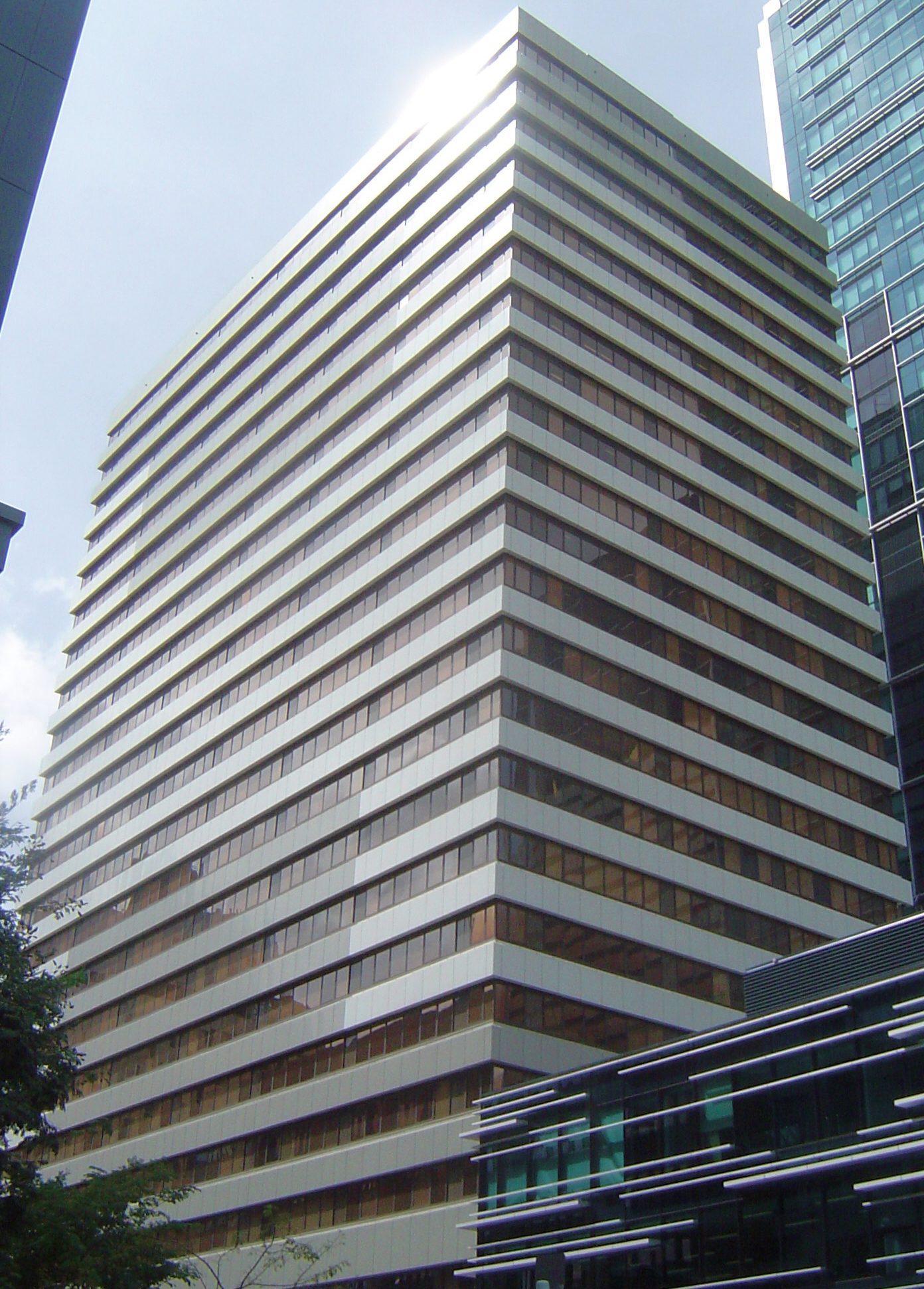
Former council offices, 2010

The Government of Queensland created the City of Brisbane with a view to uniting the Brisbane metropolitan area under a single planning and governance structure. The City of Brisbane Act 1924 received assent from the Governor on 30 October 1924. On 1 October 1925, twenty local government areas of various sizes were abolished and merged into the new city, namely:

- Cities:
  - Brisbane
  - South Brisbane
- Towns:
  - Hamilton
  - Ithaca
  - Sandgate
  - Toowong
  - Windsor
  - Wynnum
- Shires:
  - Balmoral
  - Belmont
  - Coorparoo
  - Enoggera
  - Kedron
  - Moggill
  - Sherwood
  - Stephens
  - Taringa
  - Tingalpa
  - Toombul
  - Yeerongpilly

The council also assumed responsibility for several quasi-autonomous government authorities, such as the Brisbane Tramways Trust.

== Demographics ==
Selected historical census data for City of Brisbane local government area						
Census year		2001	2006	2011	2016	2021
Population	Estimated residents on census night	873,780	956,129	1,041,839	1,131,155	1,242,825
Population	LGA rank in terms of size within Queensland		1st	1st	1st	1st
Population	% of Queensland population	24.37%	▲24.49%	▼24.05%	24.05%	▲24.10%
Population	% of Australian population	4.66%	▲4.82%	▲4.84%	▼4.83%	▲4.88%
Cultural and language diversity						
Ancestry, top responses	English			25.0%	▼24.3%	▲33.3%
Ancestry, top responses	Australian			23.1%	▼20.2%	▲27.9%
Ancestry, top responses	Irish			9.5%	▲9.7%	▲12.3%
Ancestry, top responses	Scottish			7.4%	7.4%	▲10.2%
Ancestry, top responses	Chinese			4.1%	▲5.2%	▲7.7%
Language, top responses (other than English)	Mandarin	1.4%	▲1.9%	▲2.6%	▲4.1%	▲4.4%
Language, top responses (other than English)	Cantonese	1.4%	1.4%	▲1.5%	1.5%	1.5%
Language, top responses (other than English)	Vietnamese	1.3%	▲1.4%	▲1.5%	▲1.6%	▲1.7%
Language, top responses (other than English)	Italian	1.1%	▼0.9%	▼0.8%		
Language, top responses (other than English)	Greek	0.8%	▼0.7%			
Language, top responses (other than English)	Spanish			0.7%	▲0.9%	▲1.1%
Language, top responses (other than English)	Korean				1.0%	
Language, top responses (other than English)	Punjabi					1.0%
Religious affiliation						
Religious affiliation, top responses	Catholic	28.0%	▼27.1%	▼26.3%	▼23.1%	▼20.7%
Religious affiliation, top responses	Anglican	19.5%	▼17.2%	▼14.8%	▼11.0%	▼8.5%
Religious affiliation, top responses	No religion	15.0%	▲18.5%	▲23.3%	▲31.6%	▲40.8%
Religious affiliation, top responses	Uniting	7.8%	▼6.6%	▼5.6%	▼4.0%	▼2.9%
Religious affiliation, top responses	Presbyterian	3.7%	▼3.2%			
Religious affiliation, top responses	Buddhism			3.0%		
Median weekly incomes						
Personal income	Median weekly personal income		A$556	A$696	A$770	A$947
Personal income	% of Australian median income		119.3%	120.6%	116.3%	117.6%
Family income	Median weekly family income		A$1403	A$1873	A$2091	A$2474
Family income	% of Australian median income		119.8%	126.5%	120.6%	116.6%
Household income	Median weekly household income		A$1157	A$1547	A$1746	A$2068
Household income	% of Australian median income		112.7%	125.4%	121.4%	118.4%
Dwelling structure						
Dwelling type	Separate house	74.7%	▼71.9%	▼70.9%	▼67.4%	▼62.6%
Dwelling type	Semi-detached, terrace or townhouse	6.7%	7.9%▲	▲9.7%	▲10.4%	▲11.3%
Dwelling type	Flat or apartment	17.2%	▲19.3%	▲18.8%	▲21.3%	▲25.6%

== Heritage ==
The Brisbane City Council maintains the Brisbane Local Heritage Register, a list of nominated sites that satisfy the council's heritage criteria.

== Governance ==
The City of Brisbane is governed by the Brisbane City Council, the largest local council in Australia. The Brisbane City Council has its power divided between a lord mayor, a parliamentary-style council of twenty-six councillors representing single-member wards of approximately 30,000 voters (roughly equivalent in size to state electorates), and a civic cabinet comprising the lord mayor, the deputy mayor (drawn from the majority on council) and the chairpersons of the seven standing committees drawn from the membership of council. Due to the City of Brisbane's status as the country's largest LGA, the lord mayor is elected by the largest single-member electorate in Australia. Like all mayors in Queensland, the lord mayor is vested with very broad executive power.

The Brisbane City Council operates under the City of Brisbane Act 2010, while other local governments in Queensland are governed by the Local Government Act 2009. Council meetings are held at Level 2, City Hall, 64 Adelaide Street, Brisbane City every Tuesday at 2pm except during recess and holiday periods. This temporary venue is in use due to the restoration work being performed on the traditional venue Brisbane City Hall. Council Meetings generally open to the public, excluding the Civic Cabinet.

== Wards ==
Brisbane City Council
- 31st Council
- Coat of Arms

- Logo

Type
- Type: Unicameral

History
- Founded: 1924; 102 years ago
- Preceded by: 20 Councils: Brisbane City Council; South Brisbane City Council; Hamilton Town Council; Ithaca Town Council; Sandgate Town Council; Toowong Town Council; Windsor Town Council; Wynnum Town Council; Balmoral Shire Council; Belmont Shire Council; Coorparoo Shire Council; Enoggera Shire Council; Kedron Shire Council; Moggill Shire Council; Sherwood Shire Council; Stephens Shire Council; Taringa Shire Council; Tingalpa Shire Council; Toombul Shire Council; Yeerongpilly Shire Council

Leadership
- Lord Mayor: Adrian Schrinner, Liberal National
- Deputy Mayor: Fiona Cunningham, Liberal National
- Leader of the Opposition: Jared Cassidy, Labor
- Chair of Council: Steven Toomey, Liberal National
- Deputy Chair of Council: Sandy Landers, Liberal National

Structure
- Seats: 27 elected representatives including Lord Mayor and 26 Ward Councillors
- Political groups: Majority (19); Liberal National (19); Opposition (8); Labor (5); Greens (2); Independent (1)
- Committees: 10
- Length of term: 4 years
- Salary: A$164,156 (2021) (Note: A city Councillor that does not hold the Mayoralty, Deputy Mayoralty, a Civic Cabinet Chair position, Chair of Council, or Leader of the Opposition positions has the base salary of A$164,156 excluding allowances.)

Elections
- Voting system: Instant-runoff voting
- First election: 21 February 1925
- Last election: 28 March 2024
- Next election: 25 March 2028

Motto
- Meliora Sequimur

Meeting place
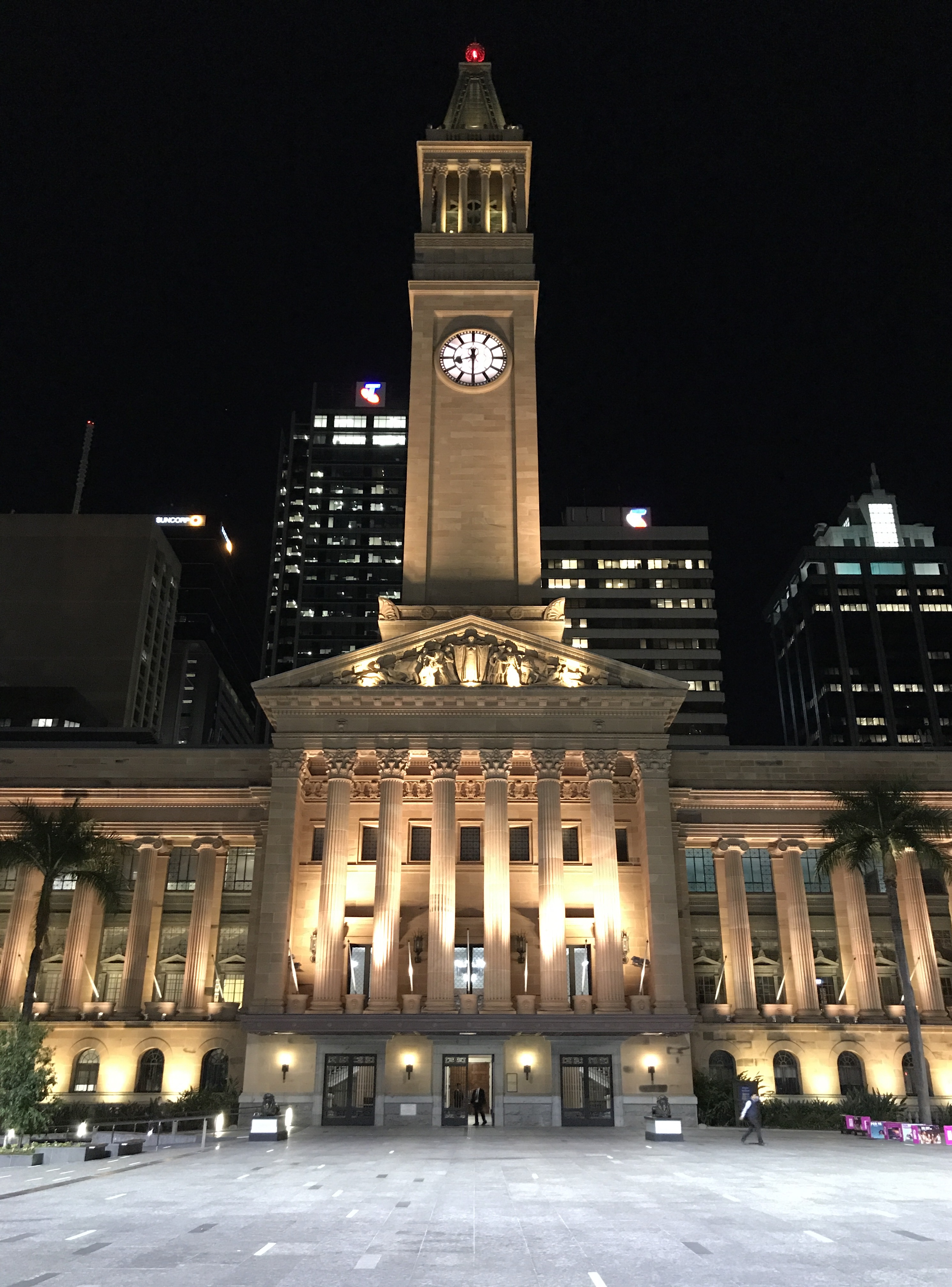
- Brisbane City Hall, King George Square, Brisbane

Website
- www.brisbane.qld.gov.au

The city of Brisbane is divided by 26 wards, each of which is represented by a councillor. Elections for these positions are held every four years. The results of the March 2024 elections delivered a Liberal National Party majority, with the wards of the City of Brisbane represented by the following councillors:

Party	Wards	Current Chamber (Total 26 Wards)
Liberal National	19	
Labor	5	
Greens	2	
Independent	1	

Ward	Party	Councillor
Bracken Ridge	LNP	Sandy Landers
Calamvale	Labor	Emily Kim
Central	LNP	Vicki Howard
Chandler	LNP	Ryan Murphy
Coorparoo	LNP	Fiona Cunningham
Deagon	Labor	Jared Cassidy
Doboy	LNP	Lisa Atwood
Enoggera	LNP	Andrew Wines
Forest Lake	Labor	Charles Strunk
Hamilton	LNP	Julia Dixon
Holland Park	LNP	Krista Adams
Jamboree	LNP	Sarah Hutton
MacGregor	LNP	Steven Huang
Marchant	LNP	Fiona Hammond
McDowall	LNP	Tracy Davis
Moorooka	Labor	Steve Griffiths
Morningside	Labor	Lucy Collier
Northgate	LNP	Adam Allan
Paddington	Greens	Seal Chong Wah
Pullenvale	LNP	Greg Adermann
Runcorn	LNP	Kim Marx
Tennyson	Independent	Nicole Johnston
The Gabba	Greens	Trina Massey
The Gap	LNP	Steven Toomey
Walter Taylor	LNP	Penny Wolff
Wynnum Manly	LNP	Alex Givney

== Heraldry ==
Brisbane coat of arms

The motto of the City of Brisbane is Meliora sequimur, Latin for We aim for better things. The council's corporate slogan is Dedicated to a better Brisbane. The city's colours are blue and gold. Its corporate logo was introduced in 1982 in preparation for the Commonwealth Games hosted in Brisbane that year. It features a stylised version of Brisbane's City Hall which opened in 1930. The city's floral emblems are the (exotic) poinsettia and Brisbane wattle, and its faunal emblems are the graceful tree frog and the koala.

== Amenities ==
Brisbane City Council operate libraries in Annerley, Ashgrove, Banyo, Bracken Ridge, Brisbane CBD (Brisbane Square), Bulimba, Carina, Carindale (Westfield Carindale), Chermside, Coopers Plains, Corinda, Everton Park, Fairfield, Upper Mount Gravatt (Garden City), Grange, Hamilton, Holland Park, Inala, Indooroopilly, Kenmore, Mitchelton, Mount Coot-tha (Botanic Gardens), Mount Gravatt, Mount Ommaney, New Farm, Nundah, Sandgate, Stones Corner, Sunnybank Hills, Toowong, West End, Wynnum, and Zillmere. In addition, it operates a mobile library service to Aspley, Bellbowrie, Brighton, Ellen Grove, Forest Lake, Manly West, Mount Crosby and The Gap. There is also a pop-up library that attends community events and festivals, as well as visiting various parks around Brisbane for children's storytime sessions (a list of dates and places is published some months in advance).

== Sister cities ==
Brisbane's sister cities are:

- Abu Dhabi, United Arab Emirates (2009)
- Auckland, New Zealand (1988)
- Chongqing, China (2005)
- Daejeon, South Korea (2002)
- Hyderabad, India (2010)
- Kaohsiung, Taiwan (1997)
- Kobe, Japan (1985)
- Semarang, Indonesia (1993)
- Shenzhen, China (1992)

Nice, France was formerly a sister city of Brisbane until the relationship was severed in 1995 as protest against the Chirac government's decision to resume nuclear testing in the Pacific Ocean. Bangkok became a sister city of Brisbane in 1997, but the partnership ended in 2017 at the latest.

== See also ==
- Lord Mayor of Brisbane
- List of mayors and lord mayors of Brisbane
- Local government in Australia
