= Jamboree Heights =

- Suburb
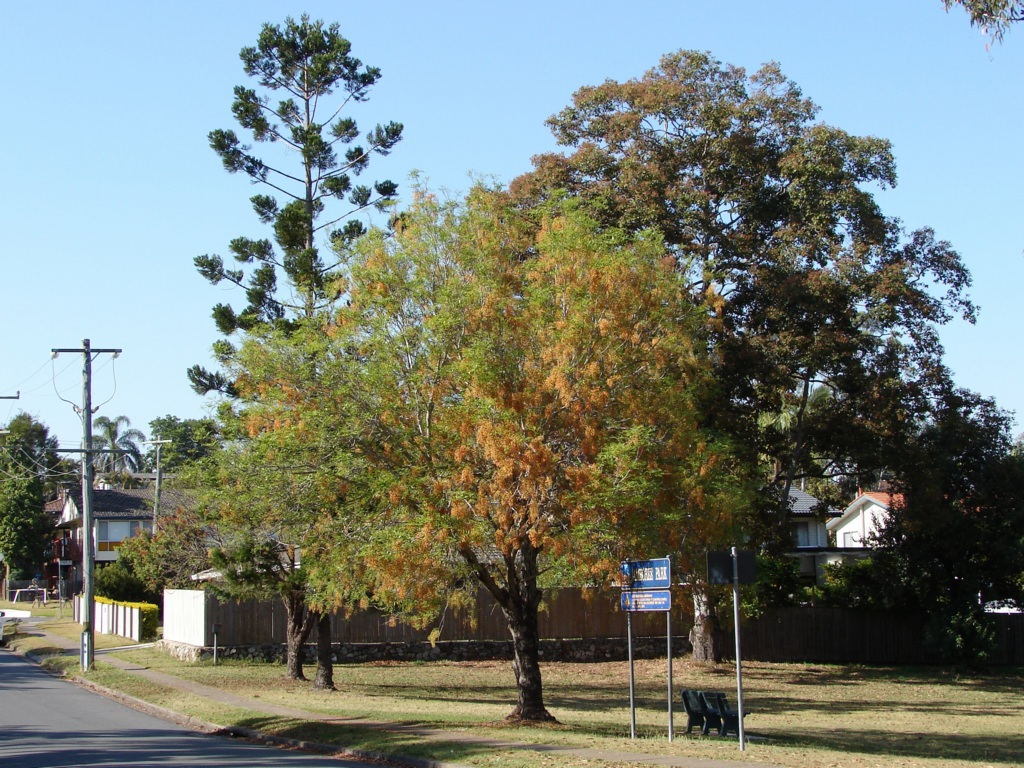
- Jamboree Park in Guide Street, 2009

- Interactive map of Jamboree Heights
- Coordinates: 27.5547°S 152.9327°E
- Country: Australia
- State: Queensland
- City: Brisbane
- LGA: City of Brisbane (Jamboree Ward)
- Location: 16.1 km (10.0 mi) SW of Brisbane CBD

Government
  - State electorate: Mount Ommaney
  - Federal division: Oxley

Area
  - Total: 1.2 km^{2} (0.46 sq mi)

Population
  - Total: 3,141 (2021 census)
  - Density: 2,620/km^{2} (6,780/sq mi)
- Time zone: UTC+10:00 (AEST)
- Postcode: 4074
Suburbs around Jamboree Heights
Mount Ommaney	Mount Ommaney	Sinnamon Park
Middle Park	Jamboree Heights	Sinnamon Park
Sumner	Sumner	Darra

Jamboree Heights is a south-western suburb in the City of Brisbane, Queensland, Australia. In the 2021 census, Jamboree Heights had a population of 3,141 people.

== Geography ==
Jamboree Heights is 16.2 km (10.1 mi) by road south west of the Brisbane CBD.

Jamboree Heights is bounded to the east by the Centenary Motorway, to the south by Sumners Road, to the west by Estate Road and Beanland Street, to the north-west by Lofts Road and Dandenong Road and to the north by the Mount Ommaney Shopping Centre.

The land use of the suburb is predominantly residential. There is a small shopping centre in Guide Street (27.5581°S 152.932686°E).

== History ==
Wolston Estate was the property of M. B. Goggs, whose father obtained the land forty years previously in the 1860s and after whom Goggs Road is named.

In 1879, the local government area of Yeerongpilly Division was created. In 1891, parts of Yeerongpilly Division were excised to create Sherwood Division.

The western part of the original land holdings that became the Centenary Suburbs were part of the Wolston Estate, consisting of 54 farms on an area of 3,000 acres (1,200 ha), offered for auction at Centennial Hall, Brisbane, on 16 October 1901. Only three of the farms sold at the original auction.

In 1903, the Sherwood Division became the Shire of Sherwood which contained the Wolston Estate. In 1925, the Shire of Sherwood was amalgamated into the City of Brisbane.

Jamboree Heights was part of the Hooker 'Centenary Project' to develop land which commenced in 1959. The suburb of Jamboree Heights was named by the Queensland Place Names Board on 1 July 1969. The name reflects the hosting of the 8th Australian Scout Jamboree in December 1967 and January 1968.

Jamboree Heights State School opened on 29 January 1974.

== Demographics ==
In the 2011 census, Jamboree Heights had a population of 3,057 people, 49.4% female and 50.6% male. The median age of the Jamboree Heights population was 36 years of age, 1 year below the Australian median. 95.3% of people living in Jamboree Heights were born in Australia, compared to the national average of 69.8%; the next most common countries of birth were New Zealand 4.7%, England 3.7%, Vietnam 3%, South Africa 2%, China 1.9%. 92% of people spoke only English at home; the next most common languages were 4% Vietnamese, 2.8% Cantonese, 2.1% Mandarin, 1% Arabic, 0.8% Gujarati.

In the 2016 census, Jamboree Heights had a population of 3,093 people.

In the 2021 census, Jamboree Heights had a population of 3,141 people.

== Education ==
Jamboree Heights State School is a government primary (Early Childhood to Year 6) school for boys and girls at 35 Beanland Street (27.5548°S 152.9289°E). In 2017, the school had an enrolment of 819 students with 61 teachers (50 full-time equivalent) and 27 non-teaching staff (16 full-time equivalent). It includes a special education program.

There are no secondary schools in Jamboree Heights. The nearest government secondary school is Centenary State High School in Jindalee to the north.

== Facilities ==
A Police Beat is located at 31 Lanena St and can be phoned on (07) 3376 8092.

A Fire Station is located at 238 Arrabri Ave and can be phoned on (07) 3279 0536.

An Ambulance Station is located on Westcombe St and can be contacted on (07) 3895 3911.

There is an Australian Naval Cadet Training Ship (TS Vengeance) located on Moolanda Street, close to the Centenary State High School.

== Transport ==
There are multiple bus services going to and from Mount Ommaney Shopping Centre Bus Exchange to the city and other locations including:

- 454 (Riverhills, Mount Ommaney Bus Exchange, Indooroopilly, Toowong, City)
- 460 (Heathwood, Forest Lake, Mt Ommaney, Indooroopilly, City)
- 453 (Mt Ommaney, Jindalee, Indooroopilly, City)
- 106 (Mount Ommaney, Sinnamon Park, Oxley, Corinda, Sherwood, Graceville, Chelmer, Indooroopilly)

There is also a S703 run which is open to the public, but is mainly used by school students heading to Kenmore State High School.
