= Jindalee, Queensland =

Jindalee
- Suburb
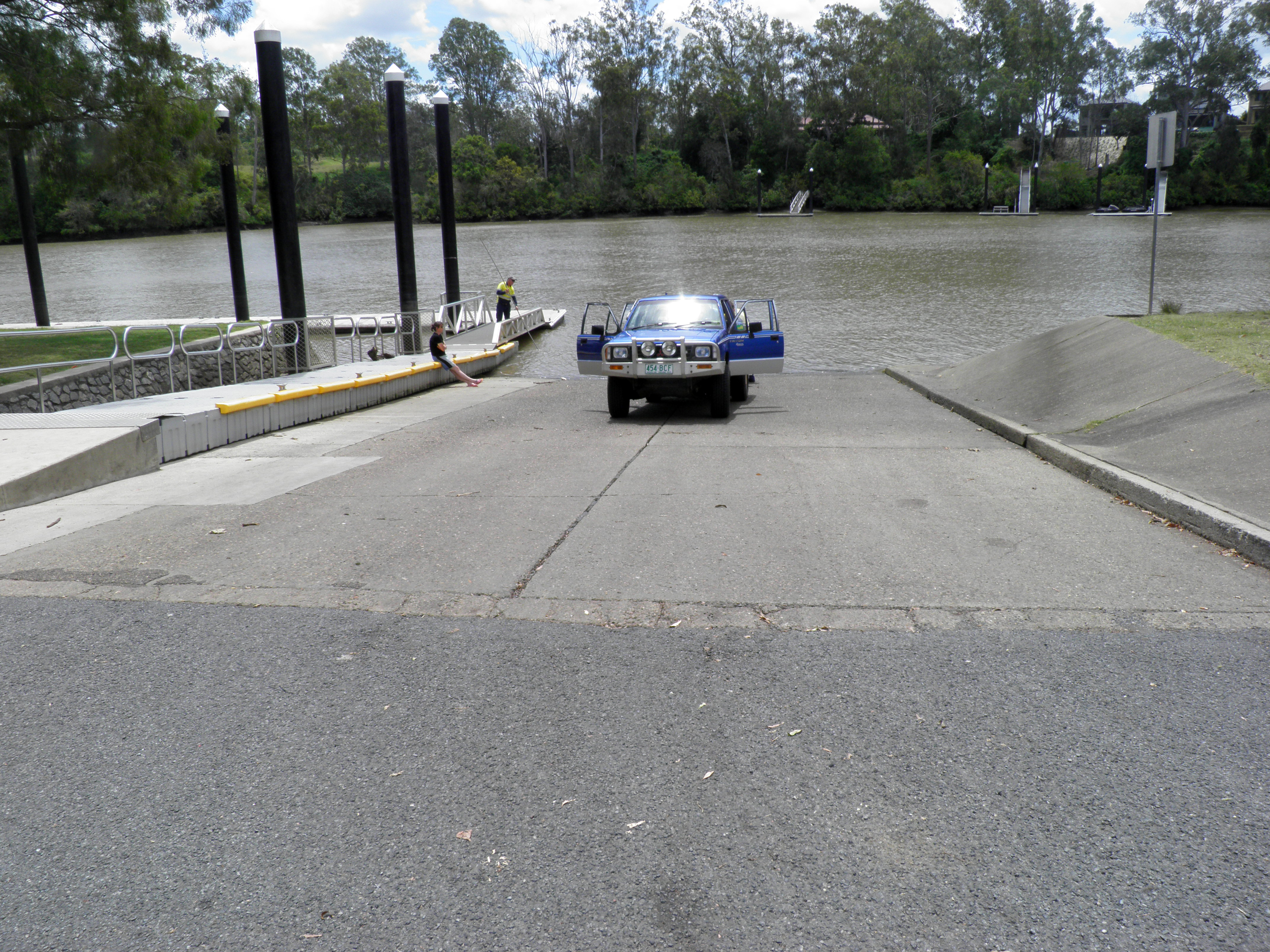
- Jindalee Boat Ramp, 2010

- Interactive map of Jindalee
- Coordinates: 27.5345°S 152.9366°E
- Country: Australia
- State: Queensland
- City: Brisbane
- LGA: City of Brisbane (Jamboree Ward)
- Location: 15.2 km (9.4 mi) SW of Brisbane CBD

Government
  - State electorate: Mount Ommaney
  - Federal division: Oxley

Area
  - Total: 3.1 km^{2} (1.2 sq mi)

Population
  - Total: 5,320 (2021 census)
  - Density: 1,716/km^{2} (4,440/sq mi)
- Time zone: UTC+10:00 (AEST)
- Postcode: 4074
Suburbs around Jindalee
Kenmore	Kenmore	Fig Tree Pocket
Pinjarra Hills	Jindalee	Sinnamon Park
Mount Ommaney	Mount Ommaney	Sinnamon Park

Jindalee is a south-western residential suburb in the City of Brisbane, Queensland, Australia. In the 2021 census, Jindalee had a population of 5,320 people.

== Geography ==
Jindalee is 15.2 km (9 mi) by road south-west of the Brisbane CBD, and is a part of the Centenary suburbs. It is bordered by the Brisbane River to the north.

The Centenary Motorway enters the suburb from the north (Kenmore), crossing the river on the Centenary Bridge (27.5278°S 152.9470°E), and forms the south-eastern boundary of the suburb before exiting on the south-east corner of the suburb into Mount Ommaney / Sinnamon Park.

The older part of the suburb is to the west of the motorway and is predominantly residential in character with individual houses. The Jindalee Golf Course is immediately west of the motorway (27.5363°S 152.9441°E). To the east of the motorway are two large retail centres, separated by Sinnamon Road (27.5327°S 152.9479°E). Also to the east of the motorway is a more recent townhouse estate between the retail precinct and the river (27.5299°S 152.9483°E).

The north-western boundary with the river has a riverside park with boat ramp (27.5296°S 152.9287°E) provided by the Brisbane City Council.

== History ==
Wolston Estate was the property of M. B. Goggs, whose father obtained the land forty years previously in the 1860s and after whom Goggs Road is named.

In 1879, the local government area of Yeerongpilly Division was created. In 1891, parts of Yeerongpilly Division were excised to create Sherwood Division, which contained the area of Wolston Estate.

A small portion of Jindalee comes from the Wolston Estate, consisting of fifty-four farms on an area of three thousand acres, offered for auction at Centennial Hall, Brisbane, on 16 October 1901. Only three of the farms sold at the original auction.

In 1903, the Sherwood Division became the Shire of Sherwood.

In 1925, the Shire of Sherwood was amalgamated into the City of Brisbane.

The Aboriginal meaning for Jindalee is "bare hills". Jindalee was the first of a series of suburbs originally called the "Centenary" suburbs, as planning for them commenced in 1959, the year of Queensland's centenary.

Prior to development, the area had been largely used for grazing and dairy farming; however, it was developed as part of the Hooker Centenary Project, beginning in 1960. The 8th Australian Scout Jamboree was held in the southwestern corner of Jindalee, which was subdivided and became Jamboree Heights, a suburb in its own right.

Jindalee State School opened on 24 January 1966.

The 1974 floods caused extensive damage to Jindalee, including inundation of many houses, as well as severe damage to the Centenary Bridge. A gravel barge rammed into the upstream side, blocking the floodwaters and raising real fears that the bridge would collapse. The barge was partly sunk using explosives to reduce pressure on the bridge. When the floodwater receded, the barge was refloated and beached downstream to be cut up for scrap. The damage sustained by the bridge required its partial closure for repairs. For two years after the floods, the bridge was reduced to a single lane. The bridge was duplicated in 1980, providing two lanes each way.

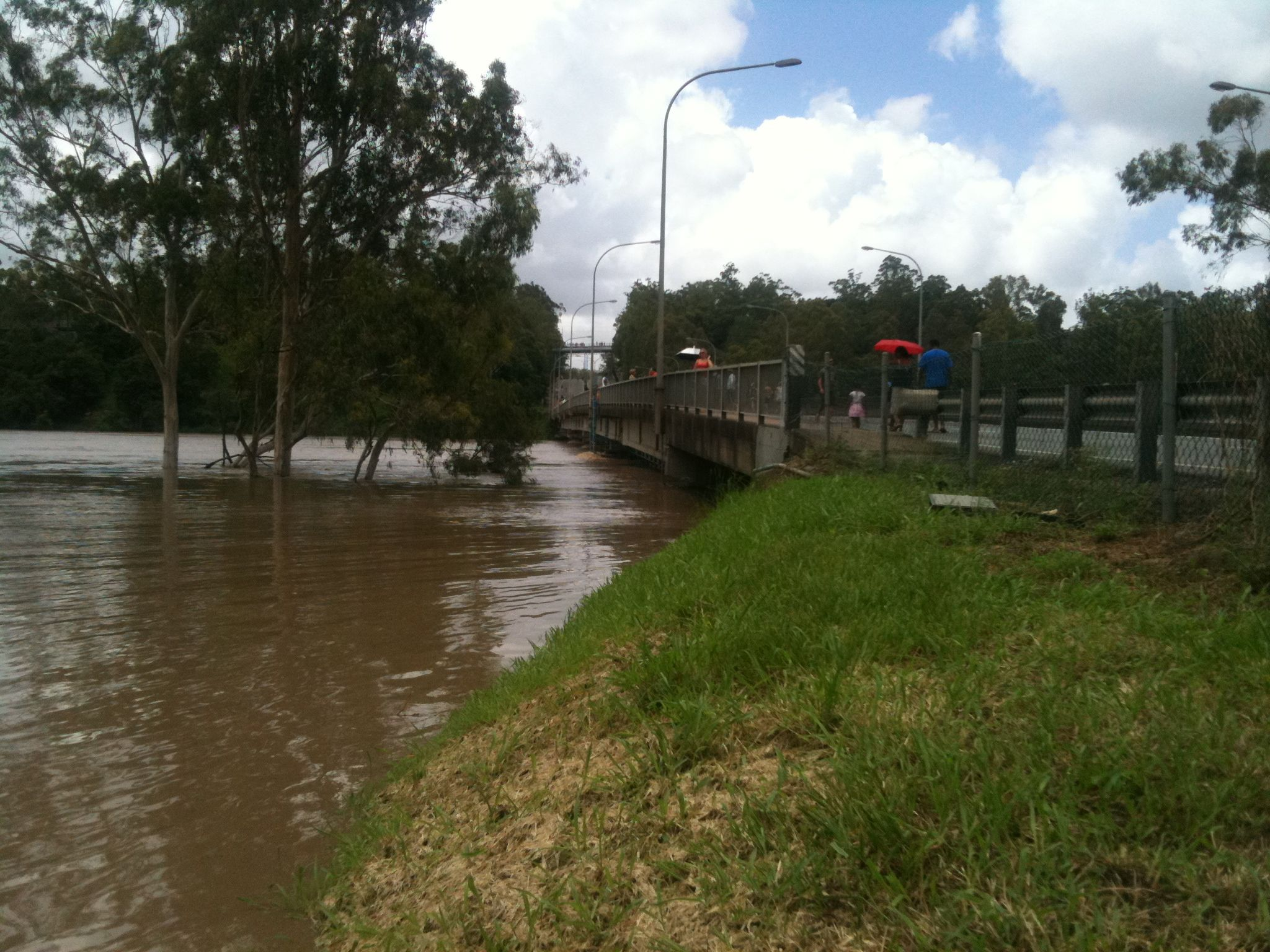
Brisbane River in flood at Jindalee at the Centenary Bridge, 2011

In 1987 Our Lady of the Sacred Heart School in Darra opened a pre-school in Jindalee, renaming the school Darra-Jindalee Catholic School. In 2003 the facility in Jindalee closed and on 14 July 2008 the school returned to the name of the Our Lady of the Sacred Heart School operating only at Darra.

Centenary State High School opened in January 1999.

The 2011 floods badly affected the suburb.

== Demographics ==
In the 2016 census, Jindalee had a population of 5,320 people.

In the 2021 census, Jindalee had a population of 5,320 people.

== Education ==
Jindalee State School is a government primary (Prep–6) school for boys and girls at 114 Burrendah Road (27.5298°S 152.9349°E). In 2017, the school had an enrolment of 820 students with 65 teachers (54 full-time equivalent) and 36 non-teaching staff (22 full-time equivalent). It includes a special education program.

Centenary State High School is a government secondary (7–12) school for boys and girls at 1 Moolanda Street (27.5386°S 152.9403°E). In 2017, the school had an enrolment of 1,484 students with 119 teachers (113 full-time equivalent) and 48 non-teaching staff (35 full-time equivalent). It includes a special education program.

== Transport ==
Jindalee is accessible via the Centenary Highway. Some Transport for Brisbane bus routes service the suburb, namely:

- 450 – City – Riverhills: CityXpress via Cultural Centre, Toowong, Indooroopilly, Jindalee, Mount Ommaney, Middle Park and Westlake (Weekends)
- 453 – City – Mount Ommaney: CityXpress via Cultural Centre, Toowong, Indooroopilly and Jindalee (Weekdays)
- 456 – City – Mount Ommaney: Rocket via Milton, Western Freeway and Jindalee (Weekdays - Peak Hours only)
- 457 – City – Riverhills: City Precincts via Coronation Drive, Western Freeway, Jindalee, Mount Ommaney, Middle Park and Westlake (Weekdays - Peak Hours only)
- 458 – City – Mount Ommane: City Precincts via Coronation Drive, Western Freeway and Jindalee. (Weekdays – Peak Hours only)

== See also ==
- Centenary Suburbs
