= Pallara =

- Suburb
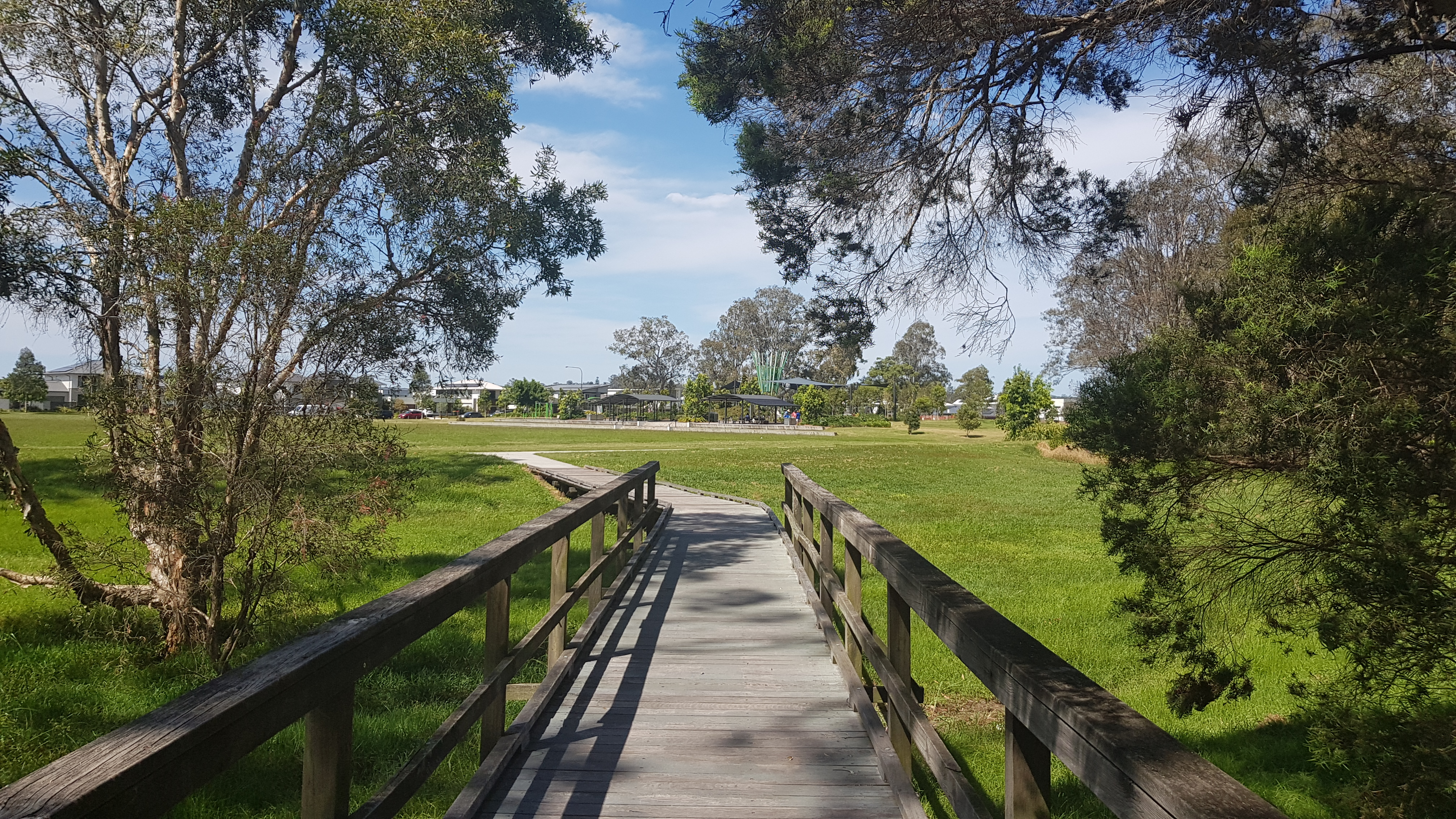
- Pallara Park, 2022

- Interactive map of Pallara
- Coordinates: 27.6208°S 153.005°E
- Country: Australia
- State: Queensland
- City: Brisbane
- LGA: City of Brisbane (Moorooka Ward)
- Location: 24.3 km (15.1 mi) S of Brisbane CBD
- Established: 1971

Government
  - State electorate: Algester
  - Federal divisions: Moreton; Oxley

Area
  - Total: 6.8 km^{2} (2.6 sq mi)

Population
  - Total: 3,861 (2021 census)
  - Density: 568/km^{2} (1,471/sq mi)
- Time zone: UTC+10:00 (AEST)
- Postcode: 4110
Suburbs around Pallara
Doolandella	Willawong	Willawong
Forest Lake	Pallara	Algester
Heathwood	Larapinta	Parkinson

Pallara is an outer southern suburb in the City of Brisbane, Queensland, Australia. In the 2021 census, Pallara had a population of 3,861 people.

== Geography ==
Pallara is 24.3 kilometres (15.1 mi) by road south of the Brisbane CBD.

== History ==
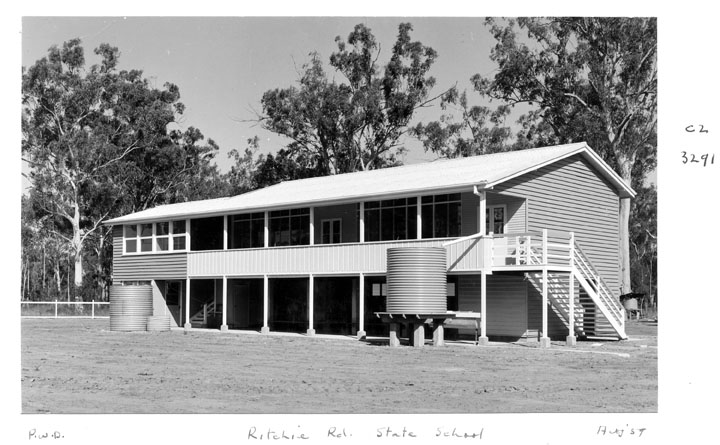
Pallara State School (then Ritchie Road State School), August 1959

The name Pallara means flat land and is derived from a non-local Aboriginal word spelt with only one "l".

The suburb is relatively undeveloped with electricity supply only reaching Pallara in 1961.

Ritchie Road State School opened on 24 August 1959. The name was later changed to Pallara State School.

In 1997, the Pallara Parklands were opened on a remediated dump.

== Demographics ==
In the 2016 census, Pallara had a population of 511 people.

In the 2021 census, Pallara had a population of 3,861 people.

== Education ==
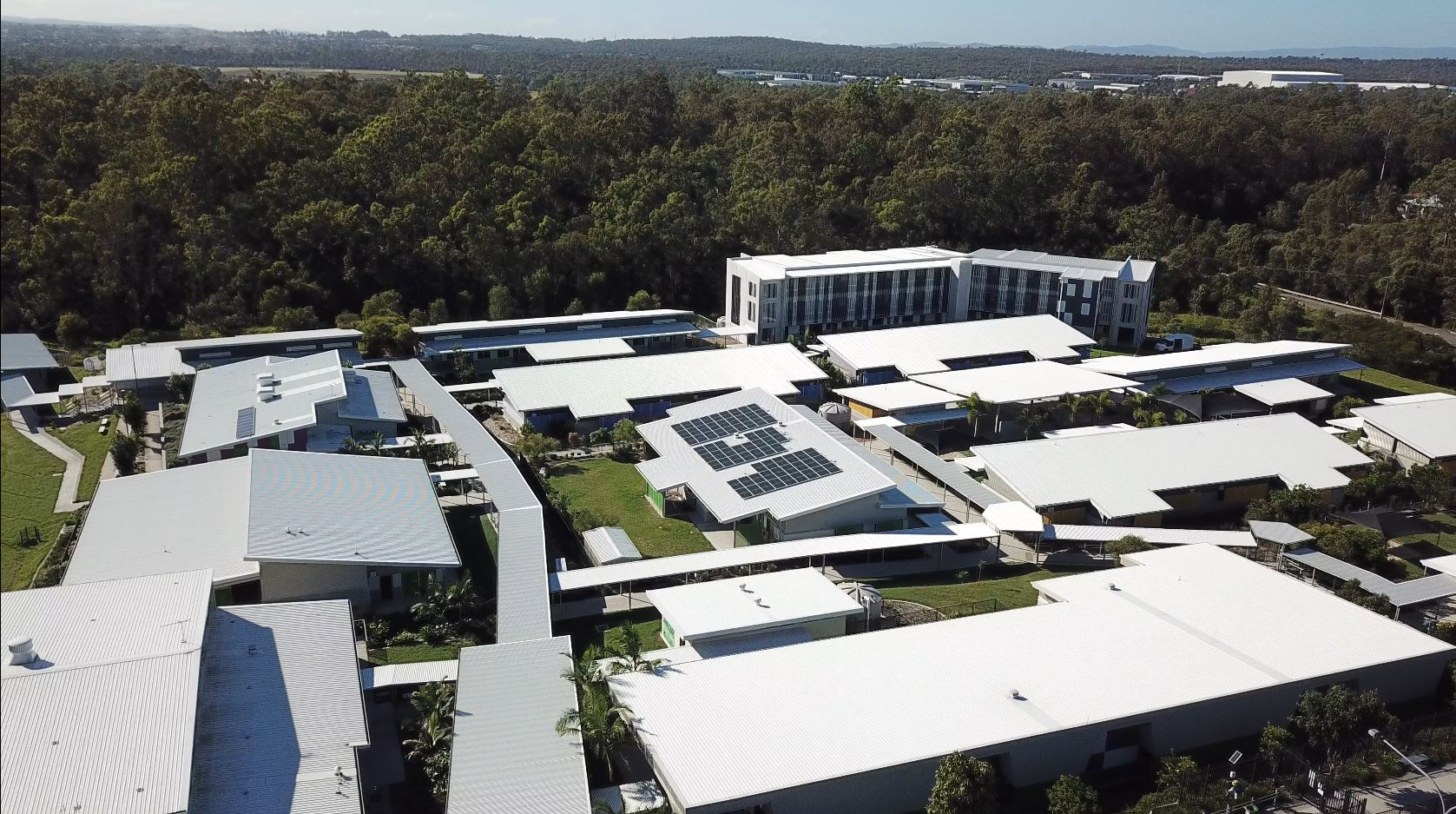
Pallara State School, 2021

Pallara State School is a government primary (Prep-6) school for boys and girls at 39 Ritchie Road (27.6290°S 152.9934°E). In 2018, the school had an enrolment of 500 students with 30 teachers (29 full-time equivalent) and 22 non-teaching staff (13 full-time equivalent). As at August 2021, the school had an enrolment of 866 students with 52 teachers (50 full-time equivalent) and 32 non-teaching staff (21 full-time equivalent).

There are no secondary schools in Pallara. The nearest government secondary schools are Forest Lake State High School in neighbouring Forest Lake to the west, Glenala State High School in Durack to the north-west, and Calamvale Community College in Calamvale to the east.

== Amenities ==
There are a number of parks in the suburb:

- Blunder Creek Reserve (27.6182°S 152.9879°E)
- Brookbent Road Park (27.6114°S 153.0118°E)
- Paradise Road Park (27.6129°S 153.0239°E)
- Sweets Road Park (27.6144°S 153.0102°E)
