= Rocklea =

Suburb of Brisbane, Queensland, Australia

- Suburb
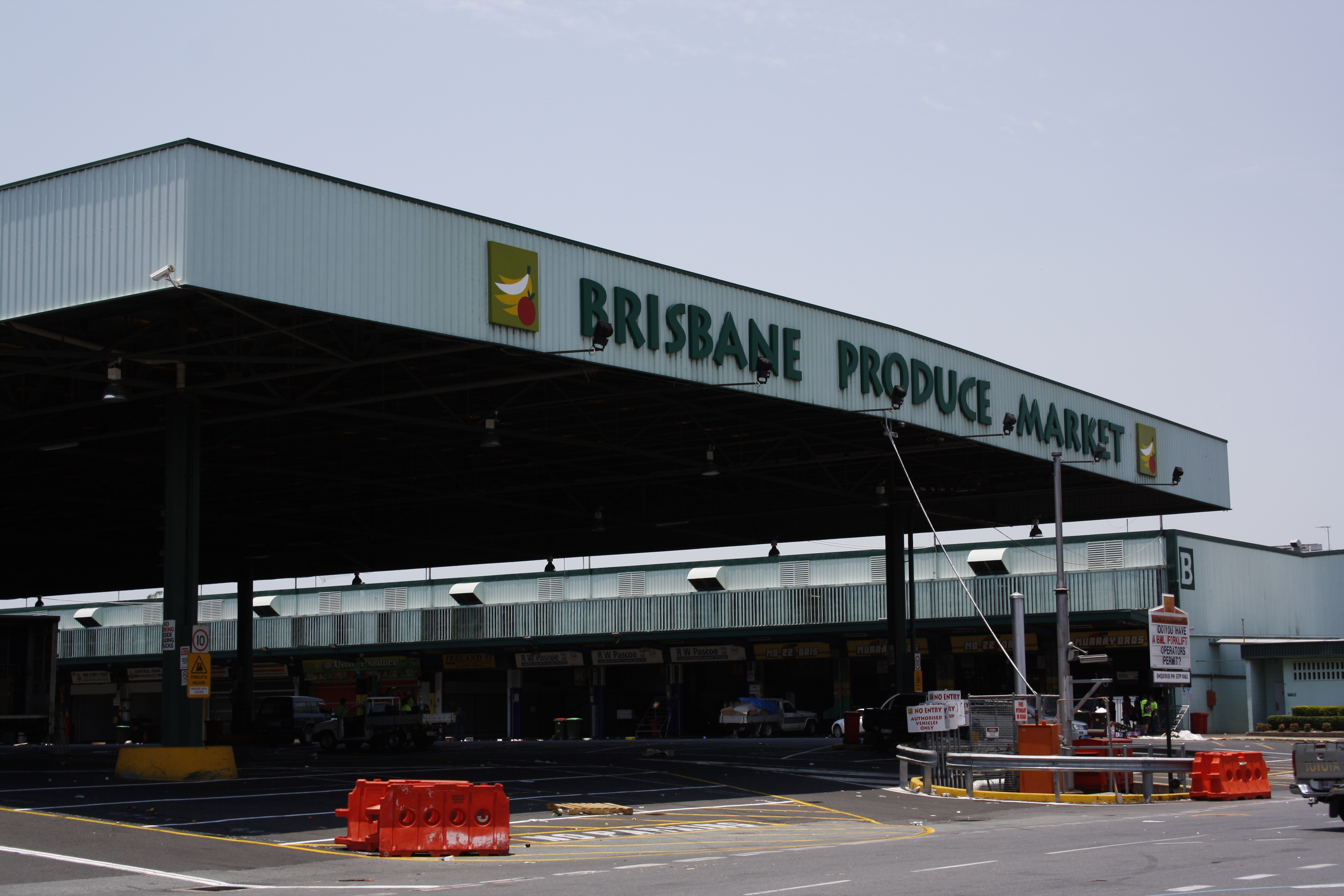
- The Brisbane Markets within the suburb

- Interactive map of Rocklea
- Coordinates: 27.5525°S 153.0027°E
- Country: Australia
- State: Queensland
- City: Brisbane
- LGA: City of Brisbane (Moorooka Ward)
- Location: 11.1 km (6.9 mi) SSW of Brisbane CBD

Government
  - State electorates: Miller; Toohey; Algester
  - Federal division: Moreton

Area
  - Total: 9.3 km^{2} (3.6 sq mi)

Population
  - Total: 1,672 (2021 census)
  - Density: 179.8/km^{2} (465.6/sq mi)
- Time zone: UTC+10:00 (AEST)
- Postcode: 4106
Suburbs around Rocklea
Sherwood; Corinda	Tennyson	Yeerongpilly; Moorooka
Oxley	Rocklea	Salisbury
Willawong	Archerfield	Coopers Plains

Rocklea is a southern suburb in the City of Brisbane, Queensland, Australia. In the 2021 census, Rocklea had a population of 1,672 people. Low-lying parts of the suburb are flood prone.

== Geography ==
Rocklea is located 9 kilometres south of the city. The west of the suburb is bordered by the Oxley Creek. The suburb's name is derived from the Rocky Waterholes in the area.

It is also at one end of the Ipswich Motorway; Ipswich Road continues north from the Ipswich Motorway, through Moorooka and into the Brisbane central business district.

The Beenleigh railway line passes through the suburb which is serviced by Rocklea railway station.

Rocklea is a mostly industrial suburb, being the home to many large firms from a range industries.

== History ==
The locality was originally called Rocky Waterholes Creek. It was renamed Rocklea after a town in Dorset, England, with the opening of the Beenleigh railway line in 1884 as it was felt the original name was too long.

The Rocky Holes Post Office was renamed Rocklea in May 1885.

The suburb was once the centre of the Shire of Yeerongpilly, which was established in 1879 and disbanded in 1925 after the City of Brisbane was created.

In August 1884, E. Hooker and Son auctioned 29 allotments of the Rocklea Estate. The map shows area near Ipswich Road and the Rocklea railway station.

In September 1884, Hooker, Sons and Elliott Auctioneers auctioned 214 allotments of the Rocklea Township estate. The allotments were on Hawtree, Brier, Piers, Holmes and Blackburn Streets. Also in September 1884, John W. Todd auctioned 28 large blocks of the Mount Pleasant Estate. The map shows the area in Rocklea bordered by Ipswich Road and what is now Boundary Road, opposite what is now Archerfield Airport.

In September 1884, 238 subdivided allotments of Rocky Waterholes Township Proper were auctioned by John Cameron. The following year, in December 1885, 152 subdivided allotments of Rocky Waterholes Township Proper Estate were auctioned by John Cameron Auctioneer. A map advertising the estate shows it to be very close to Rocky Waterholes Creek.

Rocklea State School opened on 29 September 1885.

In January 1925, work commenced on the Brisbane to Sydney railway line.

Rocklea Tramline Estate was advertised for auction on 11 September 1915 by Henry B Watson, auctioneer. 189 building sites were offered on Freney and Bale Streets, Rocklea. The map advertising the estate sale states that the estate was six minutes from Rocklea and Salisbury railway stations.

Show Ground Estate Rocklea was offered for sale in the late 1920s by Queensland Development Company, consisting of 104 allotments. The estate map shows the Brisbane to Sydney railway line under construction (built 1925–1930). The Estate was adjacent to the Rocklea Showground and included Goburra, Corella, Boobook and Galah Streets. The southern border of the estate is labelled Fauna Parade, now Fauna Parade Park.

In May 1928, W. J. Down and Co auctioned 55 allotments of the Abercrombie Estate. The map shows that the estate is in walking distance from the Rocklea railway station.

A congregation of the Church of Christ was formed in 1934, following some years of operating a Sunday school in the local Masonic Hall. A church was built in 1941 at 22 Annie Street; it was the first church in Rocklea. Increasing housing built in the area required a larger church. On Saturday 7 November 1953, a new church building was opened on the corner of Short Street and Granard Road. The increasing industrialisation in the area reduced the size of the congregation, eventually resulting in the church's in the 1970s, The church was relocated to Boonah to be used as the Dayspring Renewal Centre, the hall was relocated to Silverdale, and the funds from the sale of the land were given to support the church in Springwood.

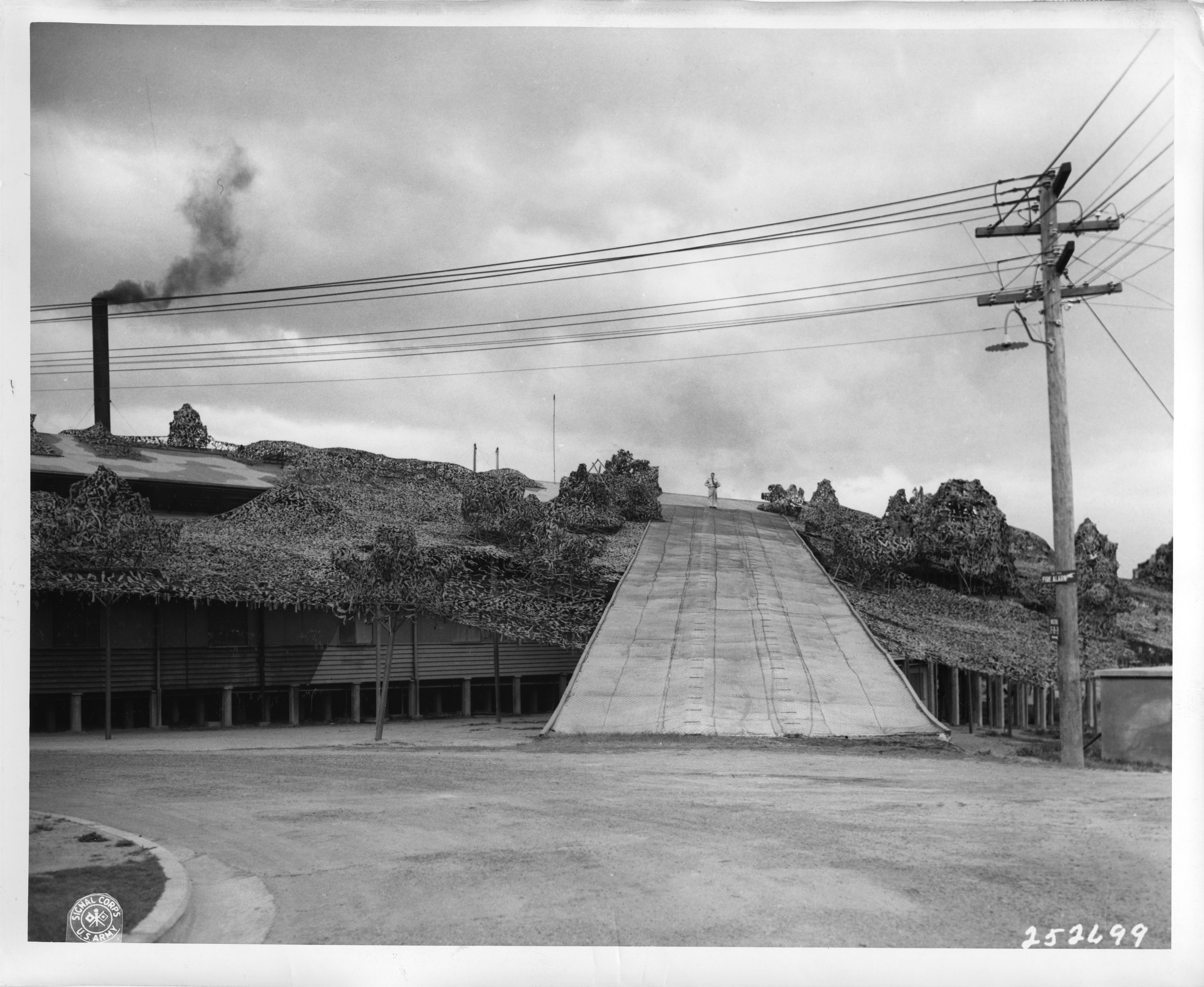
The munitions factory at Rocklea, camouflaged by a false road and leaves over the roof of the buildings, 1943

In November 1941 during World War II, the Rocklea Munitions Works was opened to make small arms ammunition and artillery shells for the Australian Army. The factory was camouflaged from above. In 1943, it was repurposed to overhaul engines for the US Army Air Force operating in the South-West Pacific against the Japanese. It was on a land parcel of over 80 acres (32 ha) on the corner of Compo Road (now Evans Road) and Industries Road (27.5439°S 153.0287°E), now within the suburb of Salisbury.

In 1949, Commonwealth Engineering established a railway factory in Rocklea.

The Brisbane Markets on a 53 hectares (130 acres) were officially opened on 31 August 1964 by the Premier of Queensland, Frank Nicklin. The first markets in Brisbane were at Market Street and produce was delivered by boats on the Brisbane River. In 1864 the markets relocated to Roma Street Markets where they were very well-located to Roma Street railway station which opened in 1873 enabling produce to be sent by rail. The markets expanded over time into Turbot Street until the traffic congestion created by the markets forced the markets to move to the suburbs in 1964.

On 31 July 2009, the last race was held at the Rocklea horse harness racing track.

Rocklea was Brisbane's worst affected suburb in the 2010–2011 Queensland floods. Bunnings on Granard Road was flooded and was closed for two months.

== Demographics ==
In the 2011 census, the population of Rocklea was 1,255, 45.3% female and 54.7% male. The median age of the Rocklea population was 36 years, one year below the Australian median. 60.5% of people living in Rocklea were born in Australia, which is somewhat less than the national average of 69.8%. The other top responses for country of birth were New Zealand 5.2%, England 2.5%, India 2.2%, China 1.8%, Russia 1.4%. 69.4% of people spoke only English at home; the next most popular languages were 2.9% Russian, 2.8% Vietnamese, 2.1% Mandarin, 1.8% Tamil, 1.7% Arabic. The most common religious affiliation was "no religion" (25%), followed by Catholic (22%) and Anglican (10%).

In the 2016 census, Rocklea had a population of 1,595 people.

In the 2021 census, Rocklea had a population of 1,672 people.

== Education ==
Rocklea State School is a government primary (Prep–6) school for boys and girls at 19 Elmes Road (27.5466°S 153.0118°E). In 2017, the school had an enrolment of 38 students with 7 teachers (4 full-time equivalent) and 8 non-teaching staff (4 full-time equivalent).

There are no secondary schools in Rocklea. The former Nyanda State High School in neighbouring Salisbury was closed by the Queensland Government in 2014, with the property purchased by (and turned into a high-school campus of) Brisbane Christian College. The nearest government secondary schools are Corinda State High School in Corinda to the north-west, Yeronga State High School in Yeronga to the north-east, and Glenala State High School in Durack to the south-west.

== Industry ==
The suburb is predominately zoned for industrial land uses. Many of the companies situated in Rocklea are part of the transport sector, with the proximity to Archerfield Airport being a drawcard. The Rocklea Works of English Electric built diesel-electric locomotives for several operators including the Queensland Railways 1600 class and successor classes.

DuluxGroup's main paint manufacturing facility is located in the suburb.

The Brisbane Markets occupy a 100-hectare (250-acre) site on Sherwood Road (27.5334°S 153.0007°E) where fresh fruit, vegetables, and flowers are sold to the wholesalers and retailers.

== Amenities ==
Despite its name, the Archerfield Wetlands is a 150-hectare (370-acre) greenspace precinct within the suburbs of Durack, Willawong, Rocklea, and Oxley in the Oxley Creek corridor. It borders the Archerfield Airport. The main entry point to the wetlands is via the Archerfield Wetlands District Park at 455 Bowhill Road, Durack. The district park replaces the former Inala wastewater treatment plant and has a number of indoor and outdoor community spaces, playgrounds with water features, and picnic and barbeque facilities. It is also the start of a number of walking and cycling trails through the larger wetlands.

== Flooding ==
Rocklea is one of Brisbane's most flood affected suburbs. Severe damage was experienced in both the 1974 Brisbane flood and 2010–2011 Queensland floods. Flooding in Rocklea is particularly harmful to the coastal ecosystem because of the oil and other toxic chemicals which are washed downstream. The effect of flooding on the Brisbane Markets was minor in 1974 but since then the site has grown five times and in 2011 35 buildings were inundated.

After the 2011 flood, home and land values in the suburb decreased dramatically. The median house price decreased by 23.9%.
