= Doolandella =

- Suburb
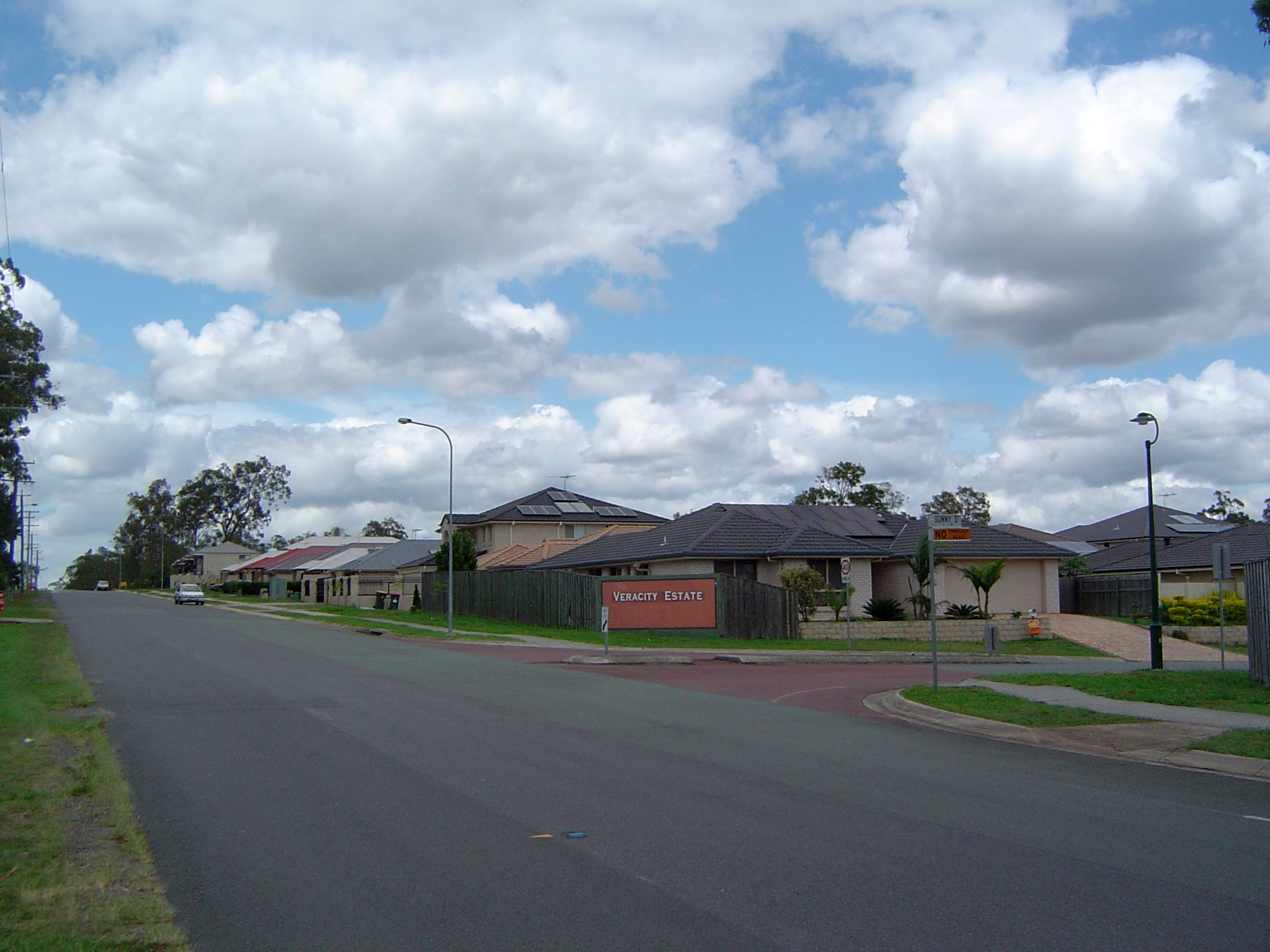
- Rockfield Street

- Interactive map of Doolandella
- Coordinates: 27.6127°S 152.9863°E
- Country: Australia
- State: Queensland
- City: Brisbane
- LGA: City of Brisbane (Forest Lake Ward)
- Location: 20.7 km (12.9 mi) SSW of Brisbane CBD
- Established: 1976

Government
  - State electorate: Inala
  - Federal division: Oxley

Area
  - Total: 3.5 km^{2} (1.4 sq mi)

Population
  - Total: 7,123 (2021 census)
  - Density: 2,035/km^{2} (5,270/sq mi)
- Time zone: UTC+10:00 (AEST)
- Postcode: 4077
Suburbs around Doolandella
Inala	Durack	Willawong
Forest Lake	Doolandella	Pallara
Forest Lake	Pallara	Pallara

Doolandella is an outer western suburb in the City of Brisbane, Queensland, Australia. In the 2021 census, Doolandella had a population of 7,123 people.

== Geography ==
Doolandella is 20.7 kilometres (13 mi) south-west by road from the Brisbane CBD. Blunder Creek forms the eastern and southern boundaries of the suburb.

The suburb has access to the Ipswich Motorway via Blunder Road as well as the Logan Motorway to the south.

The land use is almost entirely residential.

== History ==
Doolandella was declared as an official suburb in 1976. The name Doolandella, or Dulandella as expressed by Aboriginal Australians, is a Yuggera word referring to the Geebung tree, a broad leaved shrub with yellow fruit which grows in the area.

== Demographics ==
In the 2011 census, Doolandella had a population of 3,105 people, 49% female and 51% male. The median age of the Doolandella population was 30 years of age, 7 years below the Australian median. 55.6% of people living in Doolandella were born in Australia, compared to the national average of 69.8%; the next most common countries of birth were Vietnam 11.9%, New Zealand 5.6%, India 2.9%, England 2.1%, Fiji 1.7%. 53.3% of people spoke only English at home; the next most popular languages were 19.5% Vietnamese, 2.7% Samoan, 2.3% Hindi, 2.1% Mandarin, 1.9% Spanish.

In the 2016 census, Doolandella had a population of 4,817 people.

In the 2021 census, Doolandella had a population of 7,123 people.

== Education ==
There are no schools within the suburb. The nearest government primary schools are Servicetown South State School in neighbouring Inala to the north-west and Pallara State School in neighbouring Pallara to the south-east. The nearest government secondary schools are Forest Lake State High School in neighbouring Forest Lake to the south-west and Glenala State High School in neighbouring Durack to the north.

== Amenities ==
There are a number of parks in the area:

- Beccaria Place Park (27.6075°S 152.9853°E)
- Blunder Creek Reserve (27.6182°S 152.9879°E)
- Bridgeman Place Park (27.6120°S 152.9768°E)
- Daintree Close Park (27.6231°S 152.9757°E)
- Wallaroo Way Park (27.6093°S 152.9765°E)
- Wedgetail Street Park (27.6066°S 152.9821°E)
