= Inala =

Inala can refer to:

- Inala, Queensland, a place in Brisbane
- Electoral district of Inala, Queensland, Australia
- Inala, a 1985 album by the South African chorus Ladysmith Black Mambazo
