= Oxley Creek =

Oxley
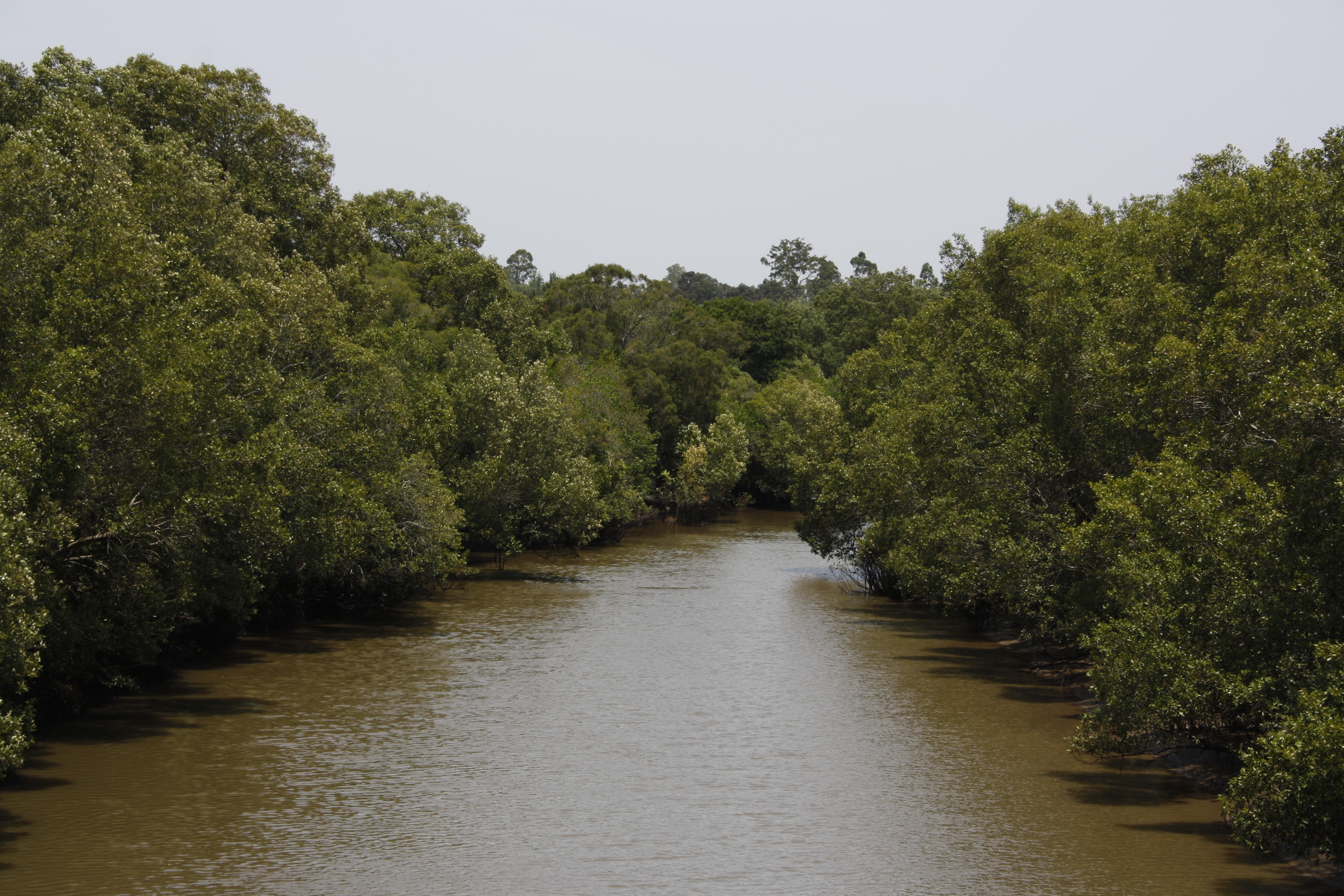
- Oxley Creek seen from Sherwood Road borders Sherwood and Rocklea

- Location of the Oxley Creek mouth in Queensland
- Etymology: John Oxley
- Native name: Benarrawa (Yagara)

Location
- Country: Australia
- State: Queensland
- Region: South East Queensland

Physical characteristics
- Source
  - location: Undullah, Scenic Rim Region
  - coordinates: 27.79187°S 152.82509°E
  - elevation: 252 m (827 ft)
- Mouth: confluence with the Brisbane River
  - location: Graceville / Tennyson
  - coordinates: 27.52389°S 152.99472°E
  - elevation: 1 m (3 ft 3 in)
- Length: 70 km (43 mi)
- Basin size: 260 km^{2} (100 sq mi)

Basin features
- River system: Brisbane River

The Oxley Creek (Yagara: Benarrawa) is a creek that is a tributary of the Brisbane River, located in suburban Brisbane in the South East region of Queensland, Australia.

Rising in the hills in Undullah in Logan City, water from the 260-square-kilometre (100 sq mi) large catchment area flows into Oxley Creek as it flows through the western parts of Logan City and into the City of Brisbane. At 70 kilometres (43 mi), the Oxley Creek is Brisbane's longest creek and the only sand-based one in the city.

The creek has been polluted from activities such as agriculture, extractive mining, industrial uses, unregulated land-filling activities, illegal dumping and wastewater treatment operations. Oxley Creek Transformation is a project designed to transform Oxley Creek into a green, lifestyle and leisure open space.

== Course and features ==
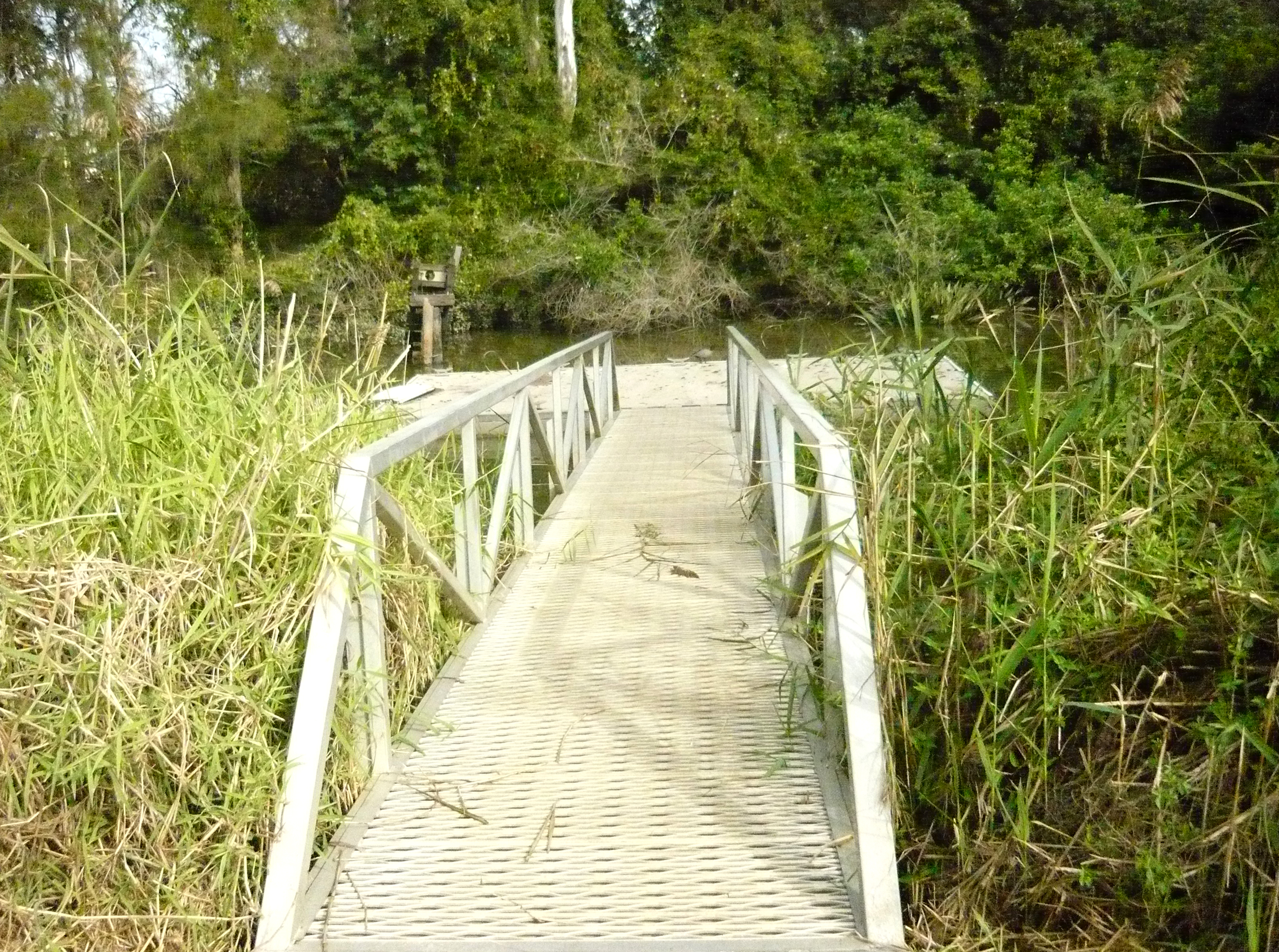
Pontoon in Oxley, 2010

The headwaters of Oxley Creek begin on the eastern slopes of an unnamed ridgeline in Undullah in Logan City, at the south-eastern extent of the Brisbane River's basin. From here, the creek flows in a north-easterly direction for about 70 kilometres (43 mi), eventually discharging into the Brisbane River where it forms the boundary between the suburbs of Graceville and Tennyson. Tributaries of Oxley Creek include Crewes Creek, Blunder Creek, Sheep Station Gully, Stable Swamp Creek, Rocky Water Holes Creek, Little Doris Creek and Moolabin Creek.

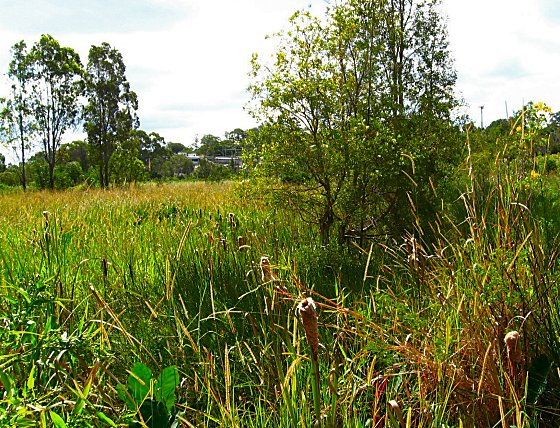
The upper catchment area of Stable Swamp Creek extends eastwards into Sunnybank

Oxley Creek's upper catchment is sparsely populated and largely natural, with forested hills and grazing land. However, in other parts of the catchment, urban development has had great impact. In the middle and lower catchment, Oxley Creek and its tributaries flow through 28 Brisbane suburbs including Algester, Corinda, Darra, Durack, Forest Lake, Moorooka, Salisbury, Sunnybank Hills, and Sherwood. Major industrial areas of Acacia Ridge, Coopers Plains and Rocklea are located in the catchment, as well as waste water treatment plants at Oxley and Inala, and the vicinity of Archerfield Airport.

Oxley Creek is crossed by the Logan Motorway (27.64026°S 152.99842°E) and the Ipswich Motorway (27.56412°S 152.98985°E). The creek is tidal upstream to the Ipswich Motorway crossing. In the suburbs of Oxley, Corinda and Tennyson the lower reaches of the creek contain the Oxley Creek Canoe Trail and are bordered by houses, parks, a driving range and sports fields. In these areas it is heavily polluted. These winding areas for the creek's catchment are prone to flooding, especially if there is an overflow on the Rocklea flood plains from the tributary Stable Swamp Creek.

== History ==
The Yerongpan clan of the Turrbal people are thought to have once roamed throughout the catchment. Traditional owners in the catchment made use of the abundant natural resources, various plants and animals were used as staple foods and the roots of the bungwall fern a particular favourite. They called the creek Benarrawa in their traditional Turrbal language.

The creek was named in honour of John Oxley who first surveyed it in December 1823. Initially Oxley had called the creek the Canoe Creek. This was in recognition of the first Europeans to reach the creek, Thomas Pamphlett, John Finnegan, Richard Parsons who reached the area after being shipwrecked on Stradbroke Island. At Oxley Creek the three found two canoes, one of which was used to cross the river and travel downstream. By 1825 it had become known as Oxley Creek.

As early as 1828, hoop pine was being felled near the mouth of Oxley Creek for use in the Moreton Bay penal settlement and in the area that is now known as Chelmer and Graceville. In 1852, the first public bridge over the creek was built for the dray road that led to Ipswich. By the 1860s timber cutters from Brisbane were entering the Oxley Creek flood plain. The creek and tributaries were described as being surrounded by dense scrubland with patches of sub-tropical rainforest.

In 2006, the Brisbane City Council established the Lord Mayor's Oxley Creek Catchment Taskforce in an effort to rehabilitate the creek and its catchment. In 2012, the taskforce was awarded 1st place in its category at the Healthy Waterways Awards.

In 2017, Oxley Creek Transformation was established as a wholly owned Brisbane City Council subsidiary with a funding commitment of $100 million over 20 years for seeking environmentally sensitive outcomes by transforming the Oxley Creek corridor into a vast multi-use parkland, reducing impacts of industry and development on the creek and surrounds, embedding flood resilience into the corridor and growing its rich network of green spaces. Priority projects include a 20-kilometre recreation trail from the river to a new nature-based adventure parkland in Larapinta, a world-renowned birdwatching destination at Oxley Creek Common, a regional parkland at Archerfield Wetlands with a visitor centre, and whole-of-corridor environmental and economic strategies.

== Amenities ==
Despite its name, the Archerfield Wetlands is a 150-hectare (370-acre) greenspace precinct within the neighbouring suburbs of Durack, Willawong, Rocklea, and Oxley in the Oxley Creek corridor. It borders the Archerfield Airport. The main entry point to the wetlands is via the Archerfield Wetlands District Park at 455 Bowhill Road, Durack. The district park replaces the former Inala wastewater treatment plant and has a number of indoor and outdoor community spaces, playgrounds with water features, and picnic and barbeque facilities. It is also the start of a number of walking and cycling trails through the larger wetlands.

== Fauna and flora ==
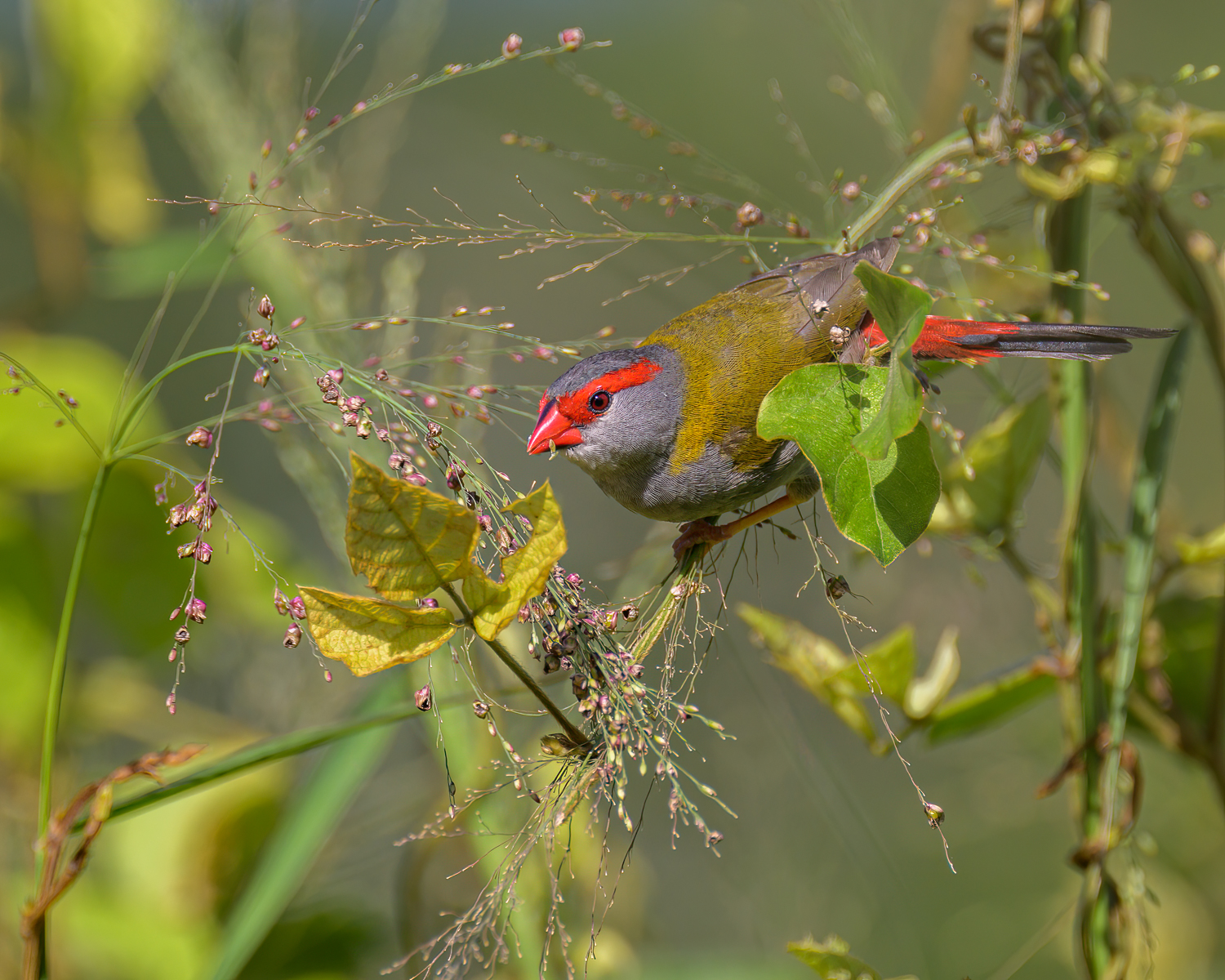
Red-browed finch

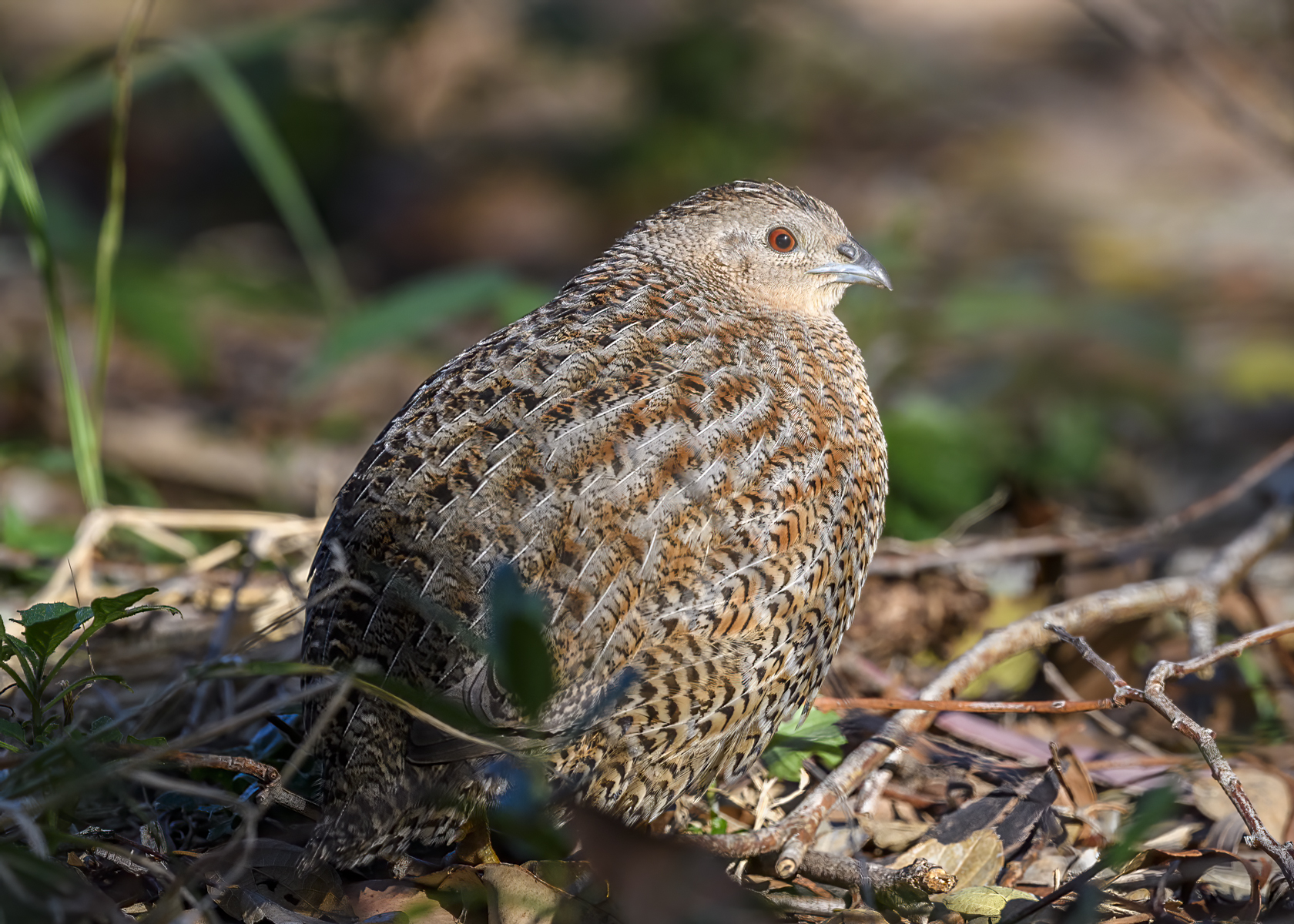
Brown quail

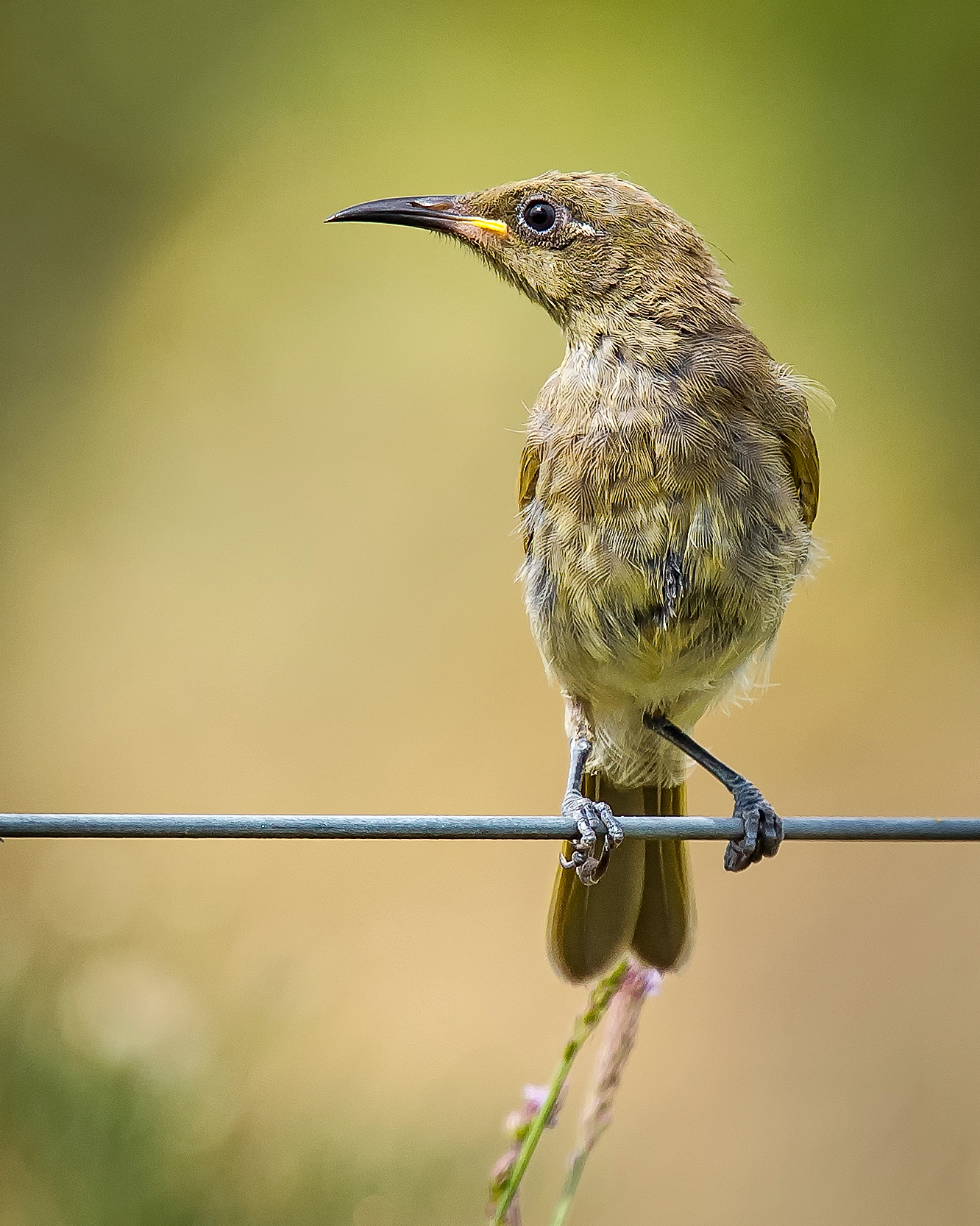
Brown honeyeater

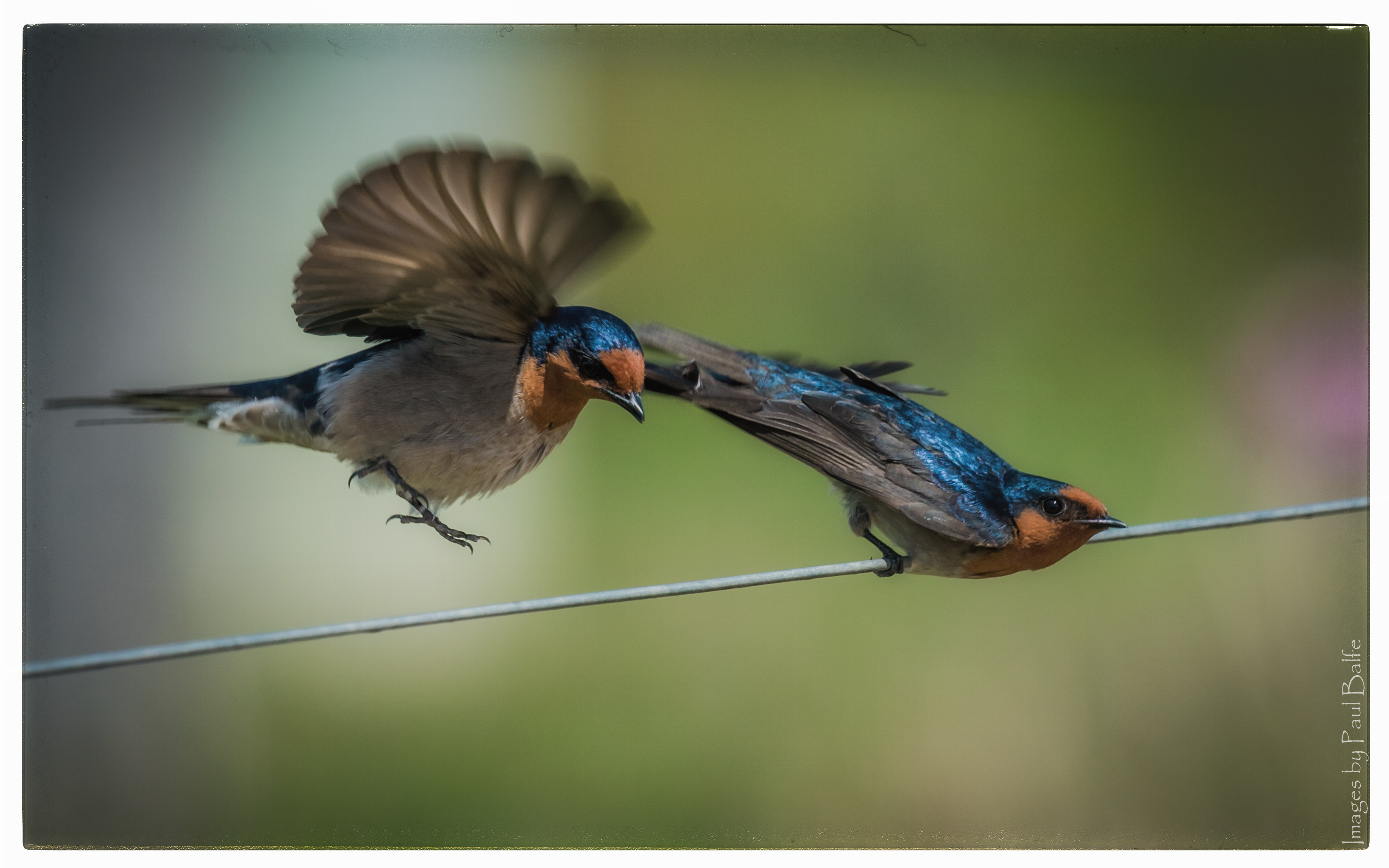
Welcome swallow pair

Some native wildlife photographed at Oxley Creek Common

The most common native marine species are the surf bream, sleepy cod, king threadfin, flathead gudgeon, dwarf flathead gudgeon, sea mullet and catfish (Arius gigas). Bull sharks have been found in the lower reaches.

The catchment is home to a diversity of plant and animal life including several species in its upper reaches listed as vulnerable: Gossia gonoclada, Lilaeopsis brisbanica, swift parrot, grey-headed flying fox, glossy black cockatoo, tiger quoll as well as the locally vulnerable eastern grey kangaroo, koala and powerful owl.

Several species of venomous snakes are found along the river including the eastern brown snake (Pseudonaja textilis), red-bellied black snake (Pseudechis porphyriacus), and common tree snake (Boiga irregularis).

== Environmental concerns ==
Residential and industry development, sewage, sediment, land clearing and sand mining in the catchment have greatly affected the water quality of Oxley Creek, particularly in its lower reaches. At Larapinta sand mining converted the anabranch into the main stream, leaving a series of lagoons.

Key environmental issues that face the catchment include rapid population increase and development, altered flow patterns of the creek causing active erosion, deteriorating water quality, increased noise and vehicle movements, waste disposal, invasion of bushland by exotic plants and animals, management of the extractive industries and the day-to-day behaviour of residents and workers of the catchment.

Local councils and bushcare groups have worked to reduce sediment entering the creek by planting vegetation. By 2008 improvements had resulted in water quality tests on the creek system's rating lifting from a F to a D. However the rating returned to F in the following three years.

Effluent from the Oxley Waste Treatment Centre was released into Oxley Creek during the 2010–2011 Queensland floods. Levels of bacteria 250 times higher than normal were recorded in the waterway. Due to safety concerns parts of Oxley Creek were not immediately cleared of debris. Brisbane's Recovery Task Group has identified Oxley Creek along with a number of other waterways that are to be targeted in the recovery process that may take a number of years to restore. According to the Queensland Minister for the Environment, Vicky Darling by January 2012, $16 million had been spent to remove more than 2,000 containers of hazardous materials from the catchment. 500 tonnes of debris had also been collected from the banks of Oxley Creek.

Some locals want a groyne to be built at the mouth of the creek to aid flows and reduce sediment, while others want a halt to sand mining because it produces silt.

== See also ==
- List of rivers of Australia § Queensland
