= Moorooka Ward =

City council ward in Brisbane, Australia

- Moorooka Ward, 2024
- Created: 1994
- Councillor: Steve Griffiths
- Party: Labor
- Namesake: Moorooka
- Electors: 30,797 (2024)

The Moorooka Ward is a Brisbane City Council ward covering Moorooka, Acacia Ridge, Archerfield, Coopers Plains, Nathan, Pallara, Rocklea, Salisbury, Willawong, and parts of Durack and Oxley.

== Councillors for Moorooka Ward ==
Member	Party	Term
Mark Bailey	Labor	1994–2003
Steve Griffiths	Labor	2003–present

== Results ==
=== 2024 ===
2024 Queensland local elections: Moorooka Ward
Party	Candidate	Votes	%	±%
Labor	Steve Griffiths	11,269	45.63	−4.27
Greens	Melissa McArdle	6,910	27.98	+7.78
Liberal National	Peter Zhuang	6,515	26.38	+1.28
Total formal votes		24,694	97.31	
Informal votes		683	2.69	
Turnout		25,377	82.40	
Notional two-party-preferred count
Labor		12,559	69.5	−0.1
Liberal National	Peter Zhuang	5,467	30.5	+0.1
Two-candidate-preferred result
Labor	Steve Griffiths	12,588	62.78	−6.88
Greens	Melissa McArdle	7,463	37.22	+37.22
Labor hold		Swing	−6.88	

=== 2020 ===
2020 Queensland local elections: Moorooka Ward
Party	Candidate	Votes	%	±%
Labor	Steve Griffiths	10,416	49.9	−0.3
Liberal National	Warren Craze	5,234	25.1	−4.8
Greens	Claire Garton	4,209	20.2	+4.2
Independent	Brett Gillespie	1,000	4.8	+4.8
Total formal votes		20,859		
Informal votes		727		
Turnout		21,586		
Two-party-preferred result
Labor	Steve Griffiths	12,837	69.5	+5.0
Liberal National	Warren Craze	5,621	30.5	−5.0
Labor hold		Swing	+5.0	

=== 2016 ===
2016 Queensland local elections: Moorooka Ward
Party	Candidate	Votes	%	±%
Labor	Steve Griffiths	11,463	51.8	−2.2
Liberal National	Brett Gillespie	7,218	32.6	−3.8
Greens	Leo Campbell	3,446	15.6	+6.1
Total formal votes		22,127	-	−
Informal votes		760	-	−
Turnout		22,887	-	−
Two-party-preferred result
Labor	Steve Griffiths	13,085	63.7	+3
Liberal National	Brett Gillespie	7,469	36.3	−3
Labor hold		Swing	+3	

=== 2004 ===
2004 Brisbane City Council election: Moorooka Ward
Party	Candidate	Votes	%	±%
Labor	Steve Griffiths	10,837	56.60	
Liberal	Julie Sinclair	8,308	43.40	
Total formal votes		19,145	97.28	
Informal votes		536	2.72	
Turnout		19,681	87.45	
Two-party-preferred result
Labor	Steve Griffiths	10,837	56.60	
Liberal	Julie Sinclair	8,308	43.40	
Labor hold		Swing		
