= Inala bus station =

Bus station in Brisbane, Australia

Inala
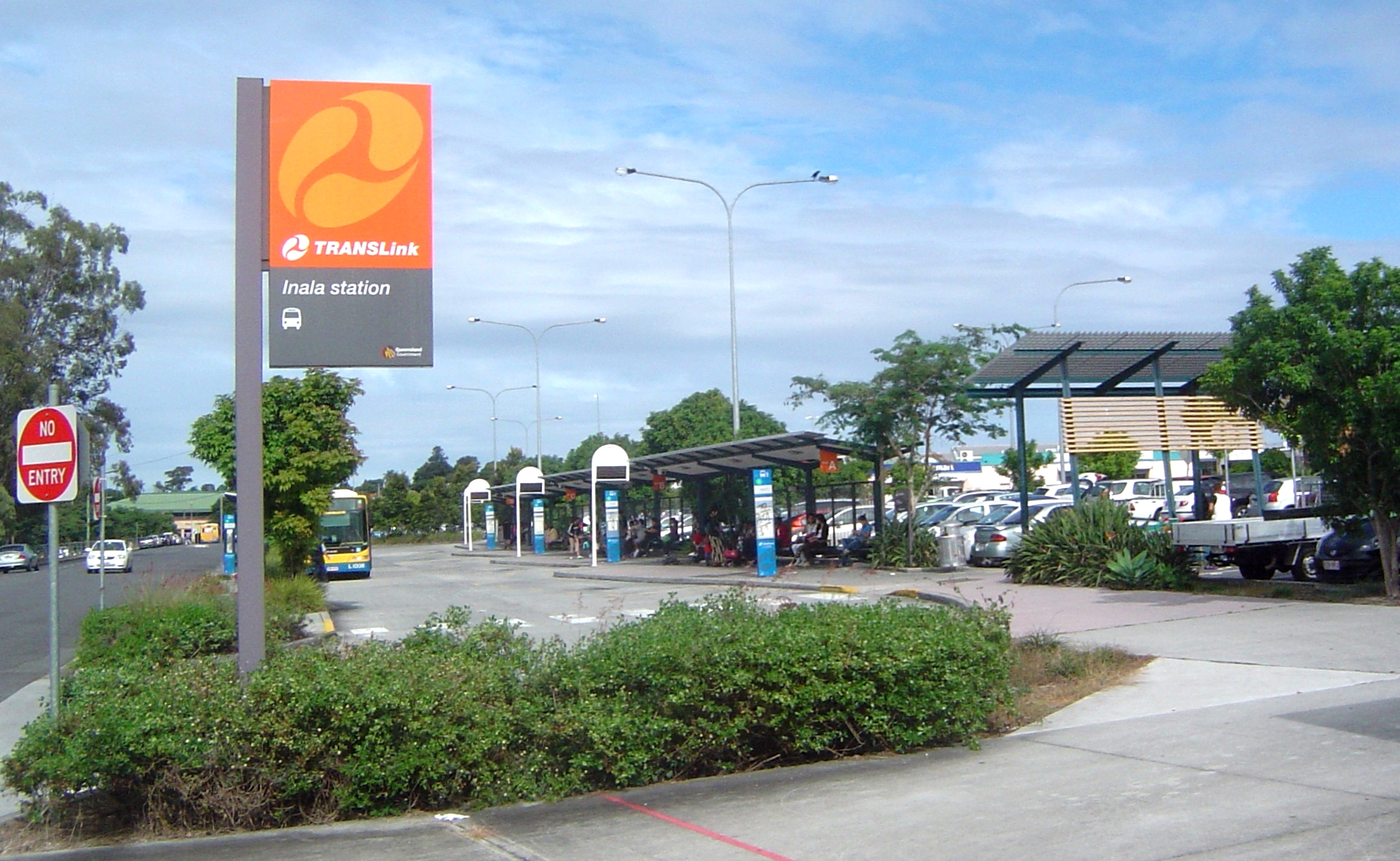

General information
- Location: Corsair Avenue, Inala
- Coordinates: 27.599345°S 152.974965°E
- Platforms: 2
- Bus stands: 5

Construction
- Parking: Park and ride
- Accessible: Yes

Other information
- Fare zone: Zone 2
Location

Inala (sometimes referred to as Inala Plaza) is a bus station operated by Translink. It is located at Inala Plaza in the Brisbane suburb of Inala. It is a ground level station, featuring two side platforms with five bus stands.

In 2025, Brisbane City Council installed permanent CCTV cameras at the station to improve safety.
