= Durack, Queensland =

Durack
- Suburb
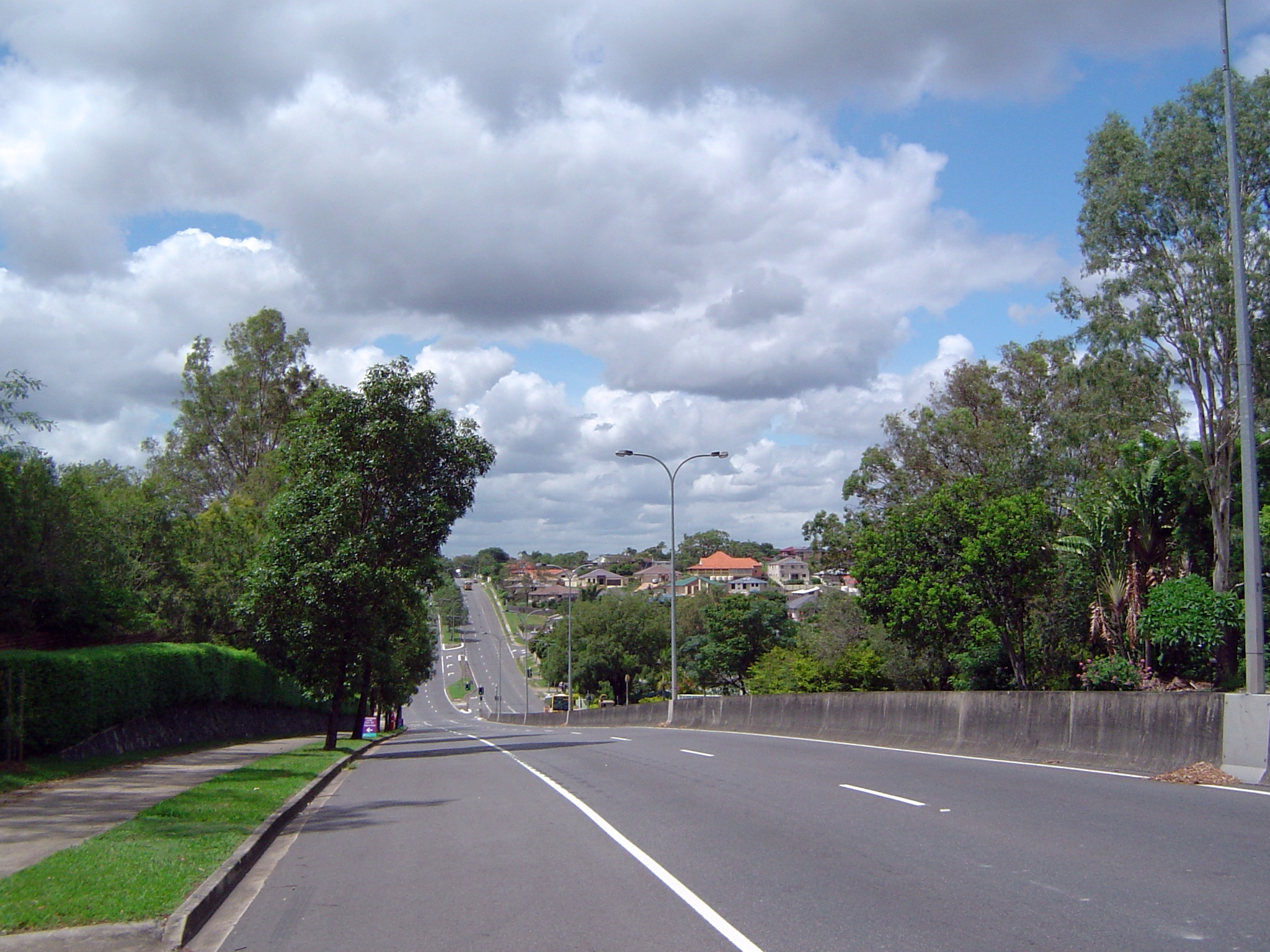
- Blunder Road

- Interactive map of Durack
- Coordinates: 27.5872°S 152.9872°E
- Country: Australia
- State: Queensland
- City: Brisbane
- LGA: City of Brisbane (Forest Lake Ward; Moorooka Ward)
- Location: 17.4 km (10.8 mi) SSW of Brisbane CBD

Government
  - State electorate: Inala
  - Federal division: Oxley

Area
  - Total: 4.0 km^{2} (1.5 sq mi)

Population
  - Total: 7,788 (2021 census)
  - Density: 1,947/km^{2} (5,040/sq mi)
- Time zone: UTC+10:00 (AEST)
- Postcode: 4077
Suburbs around Durack
Inala	Oxley	Willawong
Inala	Durack	Willawong
Inala	Doolandella	Willawong

Durack is an outer south-western suburb in the City of Brisbane, Queensland, Australia. In the 2021 census, Durack had a population of 7,788 people.

== Geography ==
Durack is 17.4 kilometres (11 mi) south-west of the Brisbane CBD.

== History ==
Durack is named after Michael Durack, one of the landholders of the Archerfield pastoral station. It was given this name in 1976 following a naming competition in a local newspaper.

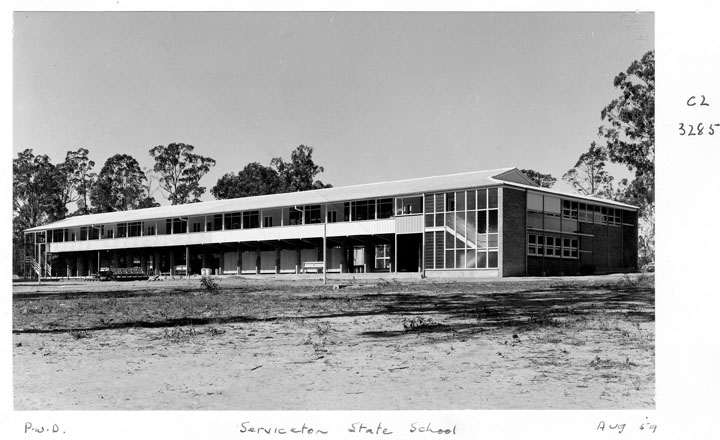
Serviceton State School, 1959

Serviceton State School opened on 27 January 1959 with 252 students under head teacher Arthur Wentworth Alpen. On 1 January 2001, it was renamed Durack State School.

Inala State High School opened on 30 January 1962. It closed on 15 December 1995 to amalgamate with Richlands State High School to create Glenala State High School on the Inala State High School site. Despite the name, Inala State High School was in Durack on the north-east corner of Glenala Road and Hampton Street (27.5861°S 152.9802°E).

Brisbane Muslim School opened in Buranda in 2002. In 2005, the school moved to Durack and was renamed Australian International Islamic College.

== Demographics ==
In the 2011 census, Durack had a population of 6,177 people, 51.6% female and 48.4% male. The median age of the Durack population was 38 years of age, 1 year above the Australian median. 54.6% of people living in Durack were born in Australia, compared to the national average of 69.8%; the next most common countries of birth were Vietnam 14.3%, New Zealand 3.9%, England 3.2%, Samoa 1.5%, Philippines 1.4%. 54.4% of people spoke only English at home; the next most popular languages were 23.2% Vietnamese, 3.1% Samoan, 1.3% Arabic, 0.9% Tagalog, 0.9% Spanish.

In the 2016 census, Durack had a population of 7,487 people.

In the 2021 census, Durack had a population of 7,788 people.

== Education ==
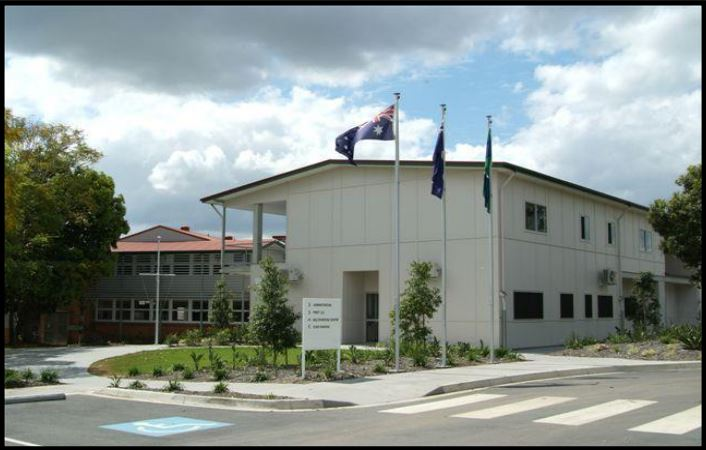
Durack State School, 2000s

Durack State School is a government primary (Prep–6) school for boys and girls at 69 Inala Avenue (27.5973°S 152.9818°E). In 2017, the school had an enrolment of 593 students with 45 teachers (40 full-time equivalent) and 36 non-teaching staff (23 full-time equivalent). It includes a special education program.

Glenala State High School is a government secondary (7–12) school for boys and girls at Glenala Road (27.5861°S 152.9803°E). In 2017, the school had an enrolment of 790 students with 72 teachers (70 full-time equivalent) and 40 non-teaching staff (30 full-time equivalent). It includes a special education program.

Australian International Islamic College is a private primary and secondary (Prep–12) school for boys and girls at 724 Blunder Road (27.5976°S 152.9877°E). In 2017, the school had an enrolment of 613 students with 45 teachers (42 full-time equivalent) and 31 non-teaching staff (25 full-time equivalent).

== Amenities ==
Phap Quang Temple, a Vietnamese Buddhist temple is located in the suburb.

Despite its name, the Archerfield Wetlands is a 150-hectare (370-acre) greenspace precinct within the suburbs of Durack, Willawong, Rocklea, and Oxley in the Oxley Creek corridor. It borders the Archerfield Airport. The main entry point to the wetlands is via the Archerfield Wetlands District Park at 455 Bowhill Road, Durack (27.58707°S 152.98786°E). The district park replaces the former Inala wastewater treatment plant and has a number of indoor and outdoor community spaces, playgrounds with water features, and picnic and barbeque facilities. It is also the start of a number of walking and cycling trails through the larger wetlands. A direct entry to the trail network is via 415 Bowhill Road, Durack (27.58601°S 152.99101°E).

== Transport ==
The Northern Section of the suburb, is Connected to Brisbane CBD, Princess Alexandra Hospital, Moorooka railway station, Inala bus station and Forest Lake by High Frequency Bus Route 100 BUZ.

Just outside the North Western Boundary is Bus 103 which links the Suburb to Inala Plaza and the Inala bus station or to Darra railway station and Mt Ommaney Centre. At Darra railway station can Connect to Trains to Ipswich, Rosewood or Springfield and Brisbane CBD. At Mt Ommaney Centre - Bus connections to Riverhills, Jindalee and to Indooroopilly Shopping Centre and Brisbane CBD., and.

The Southern Section of the Suburb is connected to Princess Alexandra Hospital with connections to Brisbane CBD, Salisbury railway station, Inala bus station by the 110 Bus. The 122 Bus links this suburb to Inala bus station, Coopers Plains railway station, Queen Elizabeth II Jubilee Hospital, Griffith University at Nathan and Westfield Mt Gravatt (Garden City).
