= Inala, Queensland =

Inala
- Suburb
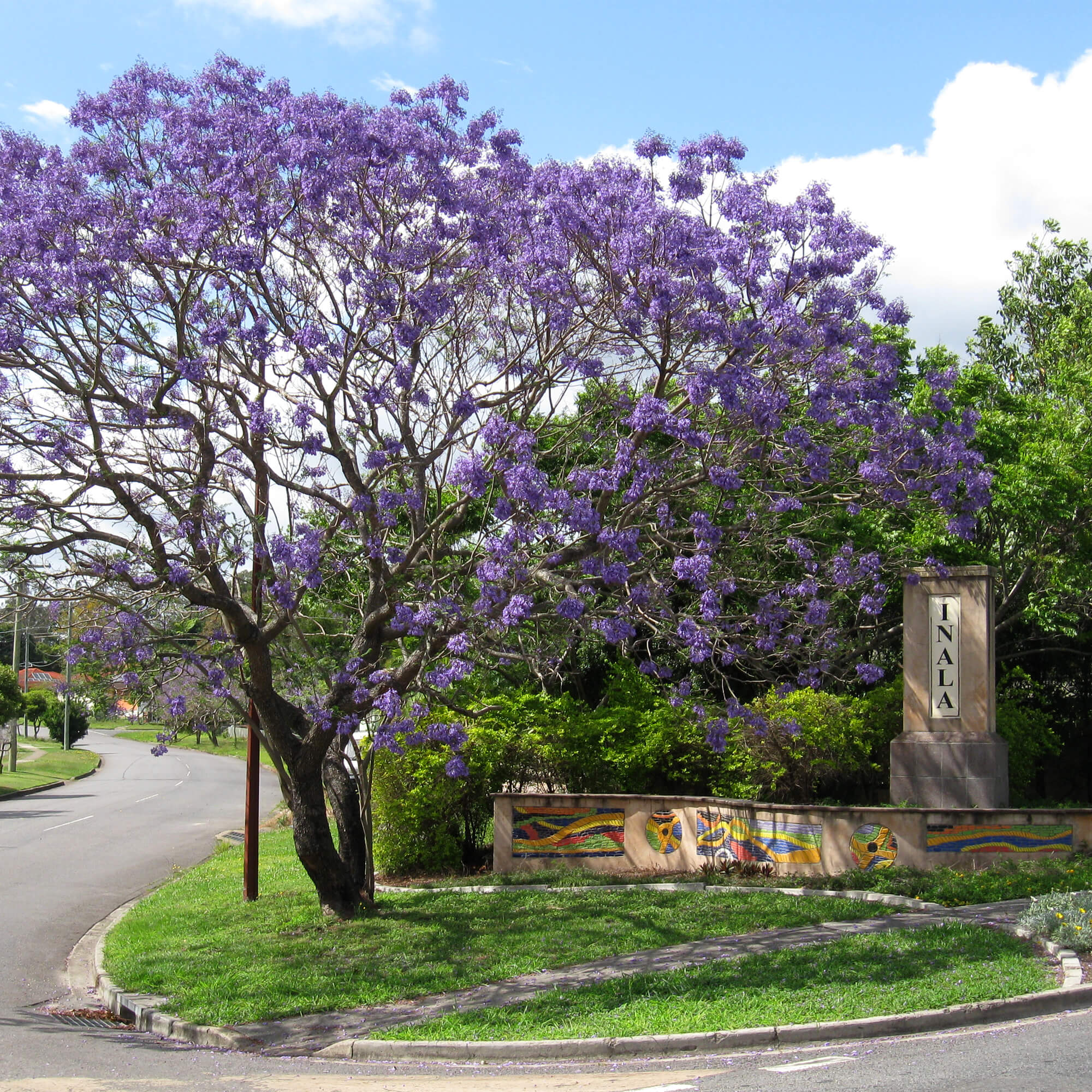
- Suburb sign at Tamarind Street, Inala

- Interactive map of Inala
- Coordinates: 27.59°S 152.9705°E
- Country: Australia
- State: Queensland
- City: Brisbane
- LGA: City of Brisbane (Forest Lake Ward)
- Location: 22.1 km (13.7 mi) SW of Brisbane CBD
- Established: 1946

Government
  - State electorate: Inala
  - Federal division: Oxley

Area
  - Total: 6.3 km^{2} (2.4 sq mi)

Population
  - Total: 15,273 (2021 census)
  - Density: 2,424/km^{2} (6,280/sq mi)
- Time zone: UTC+10:00 (AEST)
- Postcode: 4077
Suburbs around Inala
Darra	Oxley	Durack
Richlands	Inala	Durack
Forest Lake	Forest Lake	Doolandella

Inala is a south-western suburb in the City of Brisbane, Queensland, Australia. In the 2021 census, Inala had a population of 15,273 people.

== Geography ==
Inala is 22.1 kilometres (13.7 mi) by road south-west of the Brisbane GPO.

Inala Avenue/Poinsettia Street is the main roadway east–west and Serviceston Avenue/Rosemary Street and Blunder Road are the main roads stretching north–south.

== History ==
The suburb was named Inala by the Queensland Surveyor-General on 10 January 1952, using a Bundjalung word meaning resting time or night time. It was previously known as Boylands Pocket.

Following World War II there was a shortage of 250,000 houses across Australia. In Queensland alone over 4,000 families were living in makeshift dwellings of tin, calico and canvas. The Queensland and Australian Governments responded by making housing a priority.

The history of Inala started as the suburb of Serviceton, established following a meeting held in a Brisbane RSL Hall in May 1946. A group of ex-servicemen, led by Harold (Hock) Davis, were seeking affordable accommodation for their families during the post-war housing shortage. The Serviceton Co-operative Society was formed and they purchased 480 hectares of flood-safe land, which was then divided amongst the shareholders, giving them 800 square metres each. At that stage, Inala was planned as a satellite town set on a broad, high, gently sloping ridge.

In 1949–1950 the Queensland Housing Commission purchased Serviceton, comprising approximately 850 acres (3.4 km^{2}) of land, from the faltering Serviceton Housing Co-operative. The Housing Commission subsequently annexed another 200 acres (0.8 km^{2}) to the suburb and changed its name to Inala in 1953 to avoid postal confusion with another Serviceton in Victoria.

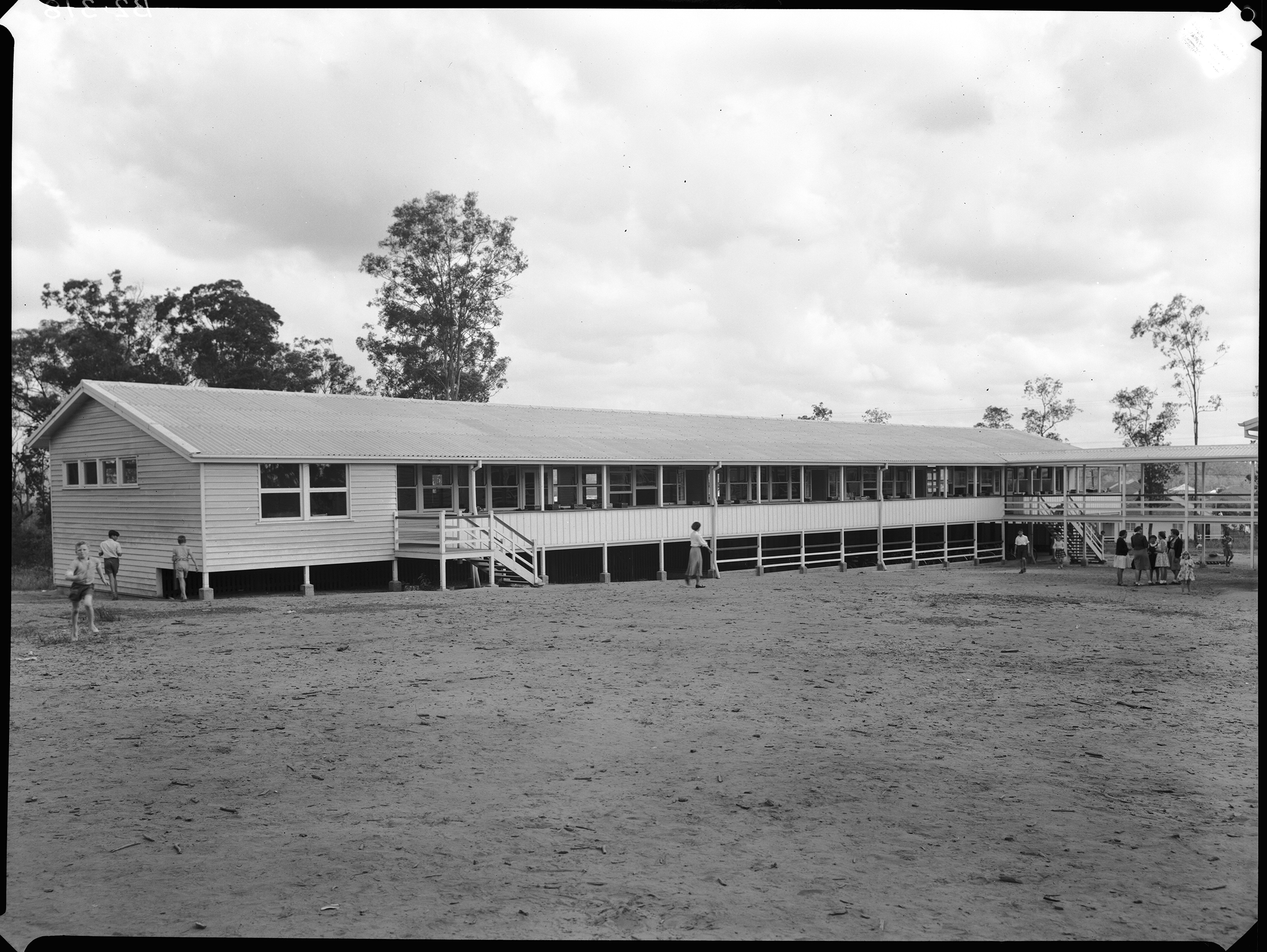
Inala State School, 1956

Inala State School opened on 1 July 1955. In September 1974, it was expanded to include a pre-school.

Inala Methodist Church opened in 1957, becoming Inala Uniting Church in 1977 when the Methodist Church amalgamated into the Uniting Church in Australia.

Inala West State School opened on 2 January 1960 at 2 Deodor Street (end of Biota Street, 27.5879°S 152.9675°E). It closed on 31 December 2009. The school's website was archived.

Serviceton South State School opened on 2 September 1963 and celebrated its 50th anniversary on 2 September 2013.

Samoa Methodist Church Inala was established circa 1965.

Richlands East State School opened on 23 January 1967 in Poinsettia Street (27.5976°S 152.9679°E). It is now within the boundaries of Inala.

Inala Special School opened on 26 August 1968. On 1 January 2007 it was renamed Western Suburbs State Special School.

Inala State High School opened on 30 January 1962. It closed on 15 December 1995 to amalgamate with Richlands State High School to create Glenala State High School on the Inala State High School site. Despite the name, Inala State High School was in neighbouring Durack on the north-east corner of Glenala Road and Hampton Street.

== Demographics ==
In the 2016 census, Inala had a population of 14,849 people, 48.5% male and 51.5% female. The median age of the Inala population was 34 years, 3 years below the Australian median. 45.9% of people living in Inala were born in Australia, compared to the national average of 66.7%; the next most common countries of birth were 19.4% Vietnam, 3.1% New Zealand, 2.0% Samoa and 1.9% England. 39.8% of people spoke only English at home. Inala had the largest Buddhist community (2,055 people; 13.8%) and the largest Vietnamese Australian community (4,446 people; 30.0%) of any suburb in Queensland.

In the 2016 census, Inala had a population of 14,849 people.

In the 2021 census, Inala had a population of 15,273 people. 46.5% of people living in Inala were born in Australia, compared to the national average of 66.9%; the next most common countries of birth were 21.4% Vietnam, 3.0% New Zealand, 2.0% Eritrea, 1.7% Samoa and 1.6% Somalia. 38.3% of people spoke only English at home followed by 30.7% Vietnamese, 3.6% Somali, 2.8% Samoan, 1.7% Arabic and 1.6% Tigrinya. The main ancestral origins of residents were 27.6% Vietnamese, 16.4% Australian, 16.2% English, 5.8% Australian Aboriginal, 4% Somali. The main religions were No religion, so described 25.2%, Catholic 18.8%, Buddhism 13.5%, Islam 10% and Not stated 9.5%.

== Education ==
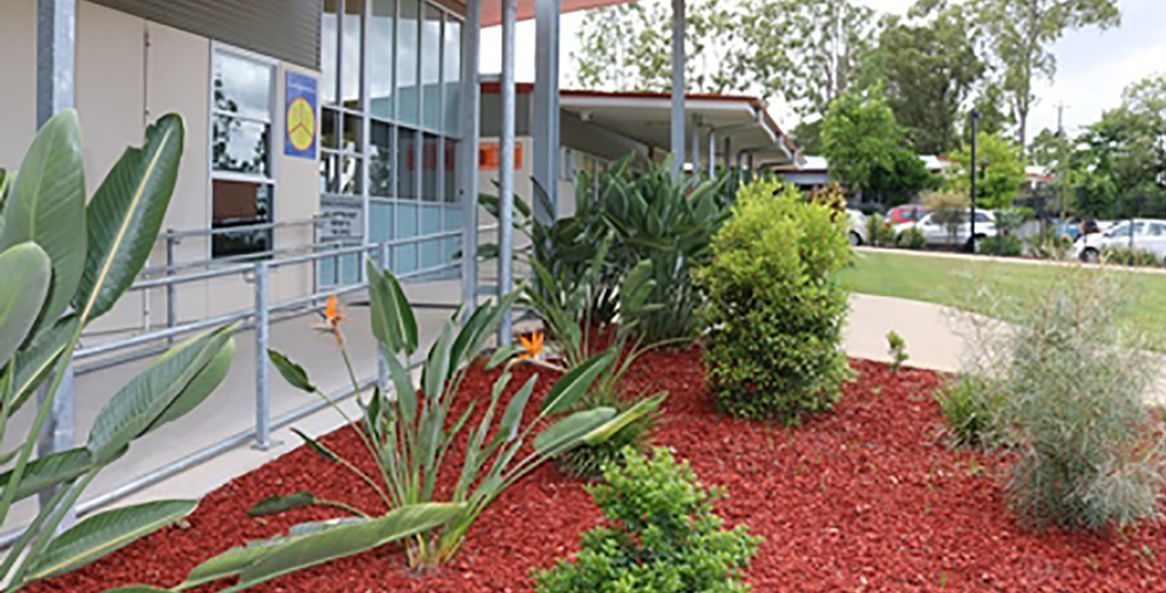
Inala State School, 2025

Inala State School is a government primary (Preparatory to Year 6) school for boys and girls at 99 Glenala Road (corner of Rosemary Street, 27.5868°S 152.9768°E). In 2018, the school had an enrolment of 539 students with 40 teachers (37 full-time equivalent) and 39 non-teaching staff (26 full-time equivalent). It includes a special education program.

Serviceton South State School is a government primary (Preparatory to Year 6) school for boys and girls at 59 Lorikeet Street (27.6058°S 152.9769°E). In 2018, the school had an enrolment of 364 students with 34 teachers (27 full-time equivalent) and 29 non-teaching staff (16 full-time equivalent). It includes a special education program.

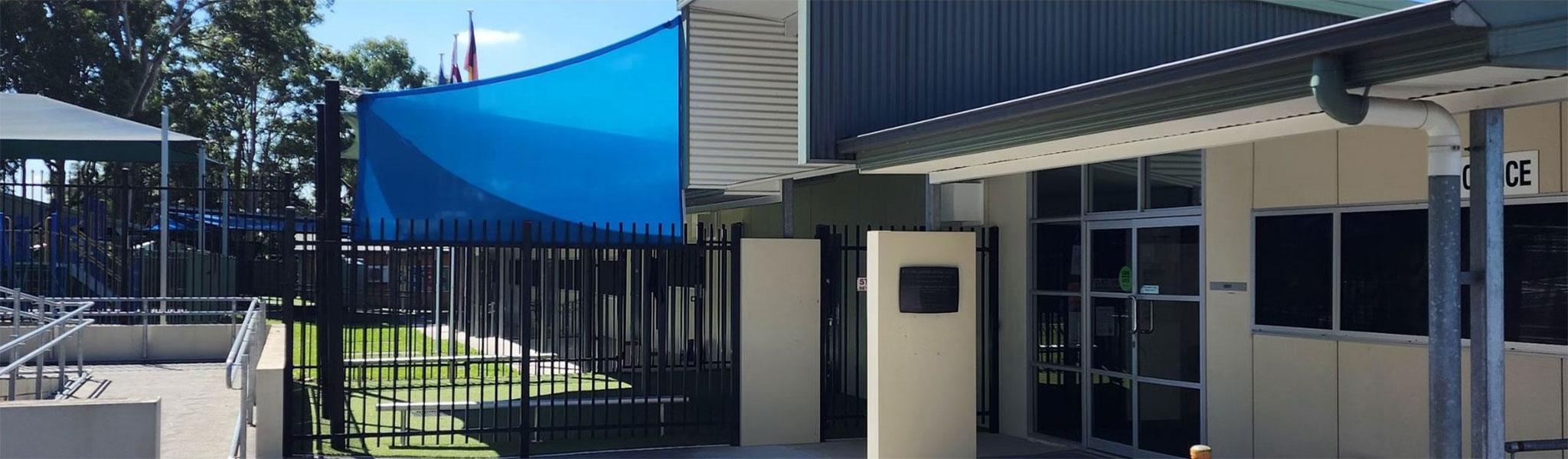
Western Suburbs State Special School, 2025

Richlands East State School is a government primary (Preparatory to Year 6) school for boys and girls at 99 Poinsettia Street (27.5971°S 152.9670°E). In 2018, the school had an enrolment of 555 students with 43 teachers (37 full-time equivalent) and 35 non-teaching staff (22 full-time equivalent). It includes a special education program.

St Mark's School is a Catholic primary (Preparatory to Year 6) school for boys and girls at 92 Lilac Street (27.5941°S 152.9684°E). In 2018, the school had an enrolment of 487 students with 38 teachers (32 full-time equivalent) and 21 non-teaching staff (13 full-time equivalent).

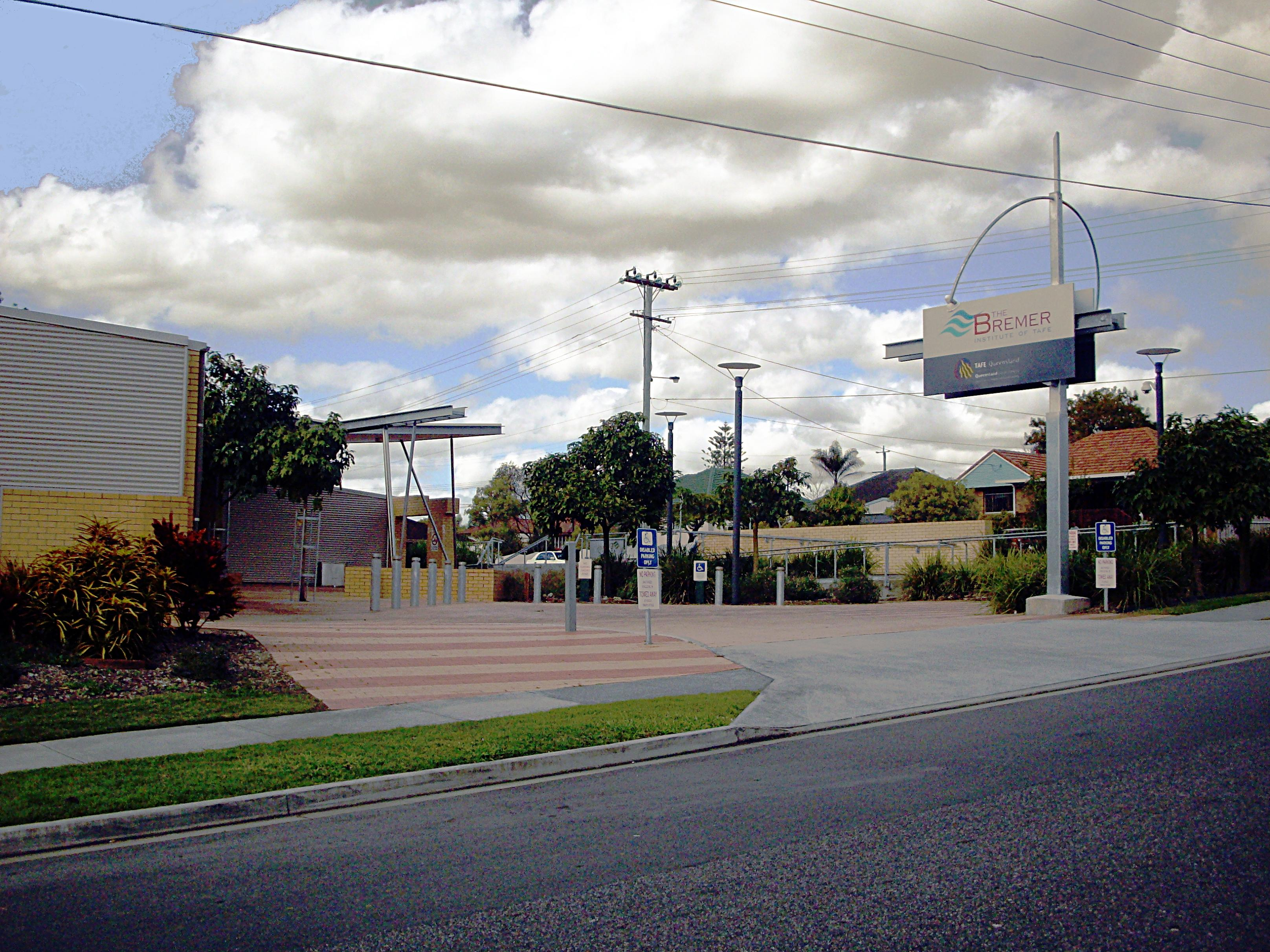
TAFE college, Inala, 2008

Inala Flexible Learning Centre is a Catholic secondary (7–12) school for boys and girls at 79 Poinsettia Street (27.5978°S 152.9665°E). It is operated by Edmund Rice Education Australia and provides individual educational programs for children who do not engage effectively with mainstream education for a variety of reasons. In 2018, the school had an enrolment of 70 students with 11 teachers (8 full-time equivalent) and 13 non-teaching staff (8 full-time equivalent).

Western Suburbs State Special School is a primary and secondary (Preparatory to Year 12) school providing special education for boys and girls at 78 Glenala Road (27.5868°S 152.9776°E). In 2018, the school had an enrolment of 175 students with 48 teachers (43 full-time equivalent) and 65 non-teaching staff (39 full-time equivalent).

There is no secondary school in Inala. The nearest government secondary schools are Glenala State High School in neighbouring Durack to the east and Forest Lake State High School in neighbouring Forest Lake to the south.

Inala also has a campus of the TAFE Queensland at 54 Thrush Street (27.6028°S 152.9764°E).

== Amenities ==
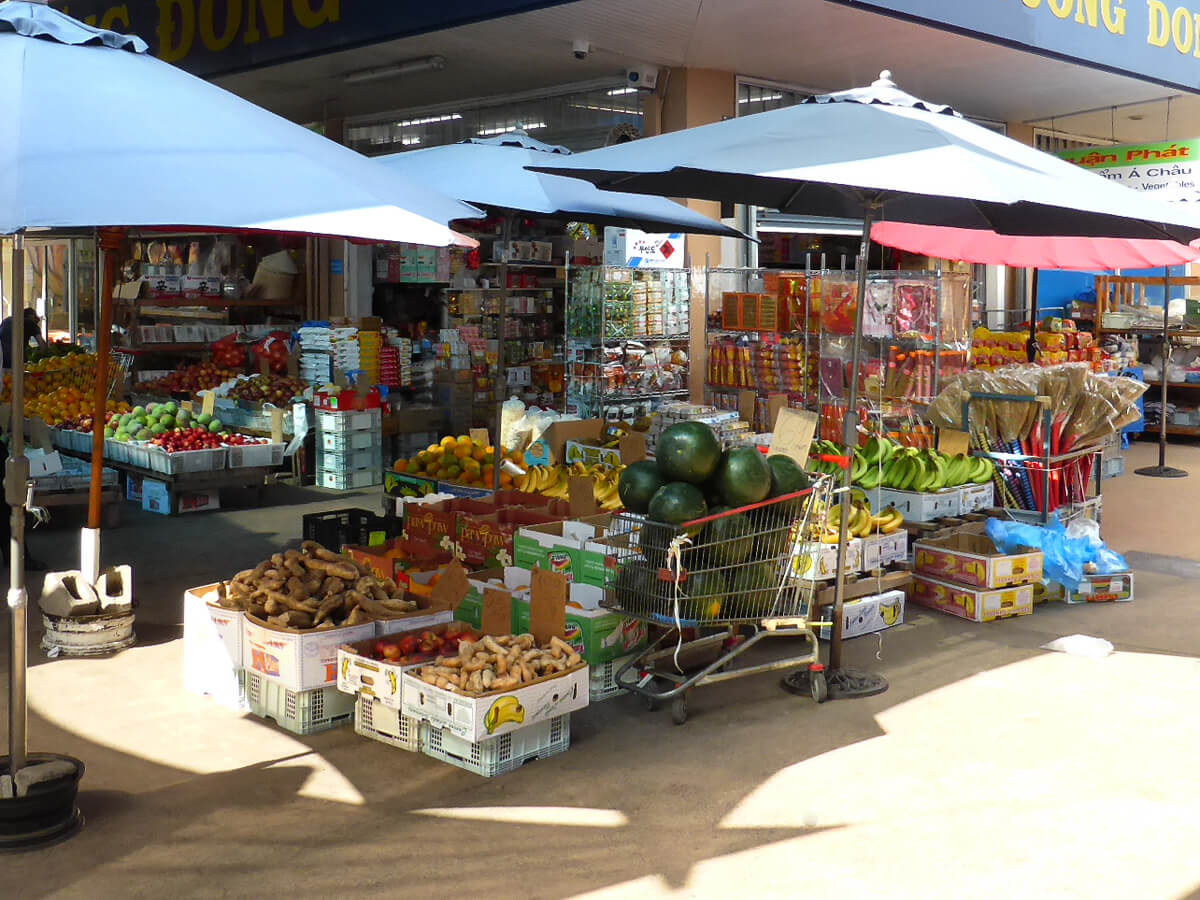
Market at Inala Civic

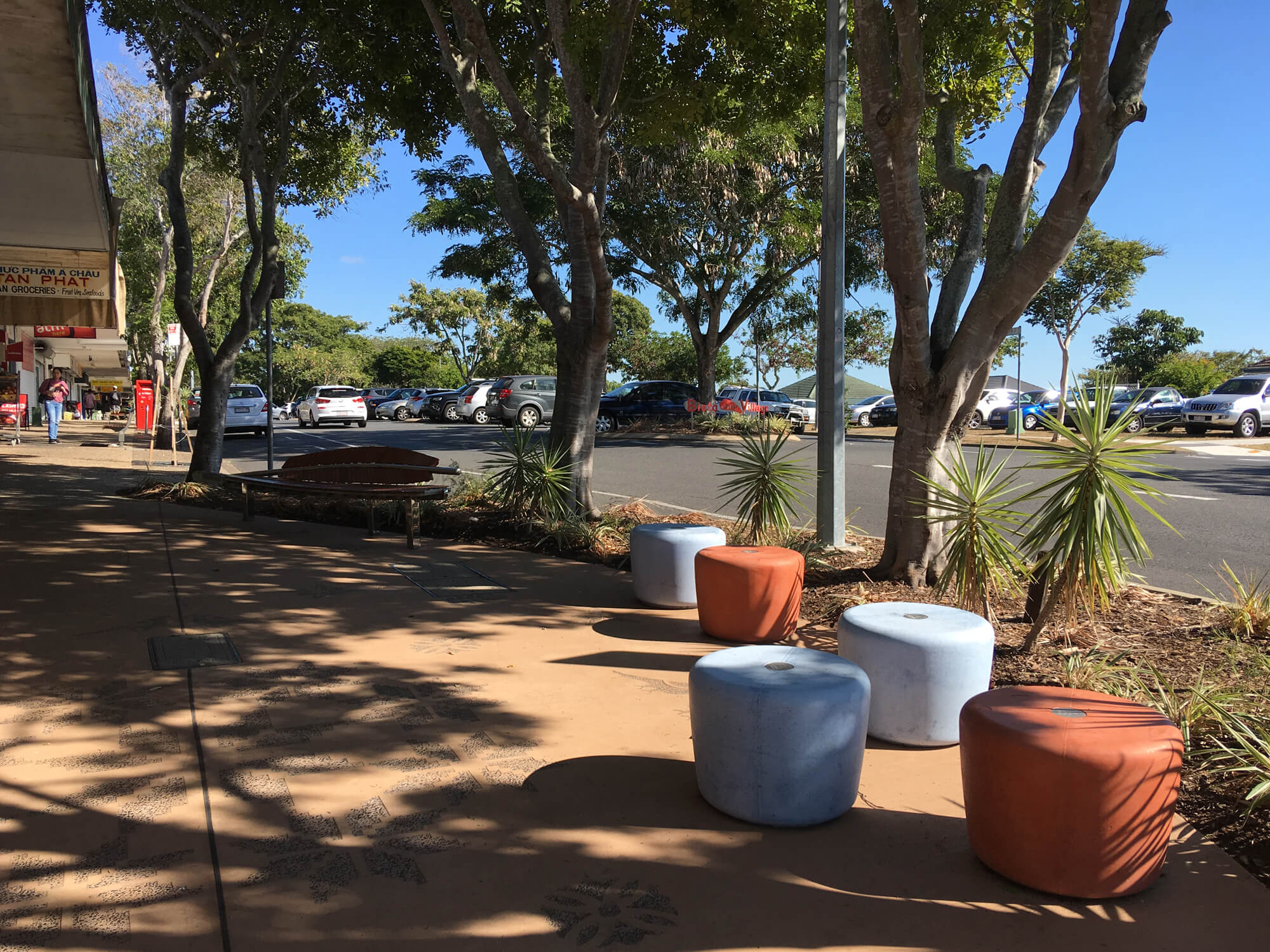
Biota Street Village shopping precinct, Inala

=== Shopping ===
There are several shopping precincts within Inala. The joined Inala Plaza–Civic Centre complex located on the corner of Kittyhawk and Inala Avenues is the largest precinct in Inala. It offers two major supermarkets, Vietnamese markets, restaurants, and a wide variety of independent shops. Other shops and restaurants exist on Biota Street located to the north, on Skylark Street to the east, and on the junction of Lavender and Lilac Streets.

=== Services ===
Inala has two post offices, numerous medical centres and services, many of which are bulk billing.

Most government services are located within the Inala Plaza precinct and its surrounds. These include a Brisbane City Council Library, Department of Communities, Housing and Digital Economy, Department of Corrective Services and a Medicare and Centrelink office.

=== Culture ===
There are two community halls and a community art gallery.

The Inala Library opened in 1963 with a major refurbishment in 1994 and a smaller renovation in 2011.

=== Community groups ===
The Richlands, Inala and Suburbs History Group is dedicated to the research of local history and diverse cultural heritage, historical presentations and book publications on the topics of local history, community and culture.

There are a large number of government funded and non-government non-profit community organisations and programs located in Inala, some of these include Inala Community Centre, Hub Neighbourhood Centre, Inala Community House, Skylarkers Healthy Ageing, Western Districts Out of Home Care, Inala Youth Service, Western Districts Family Steps, Childcare Access, Equity Resource Support Unit.

=== Parks ===
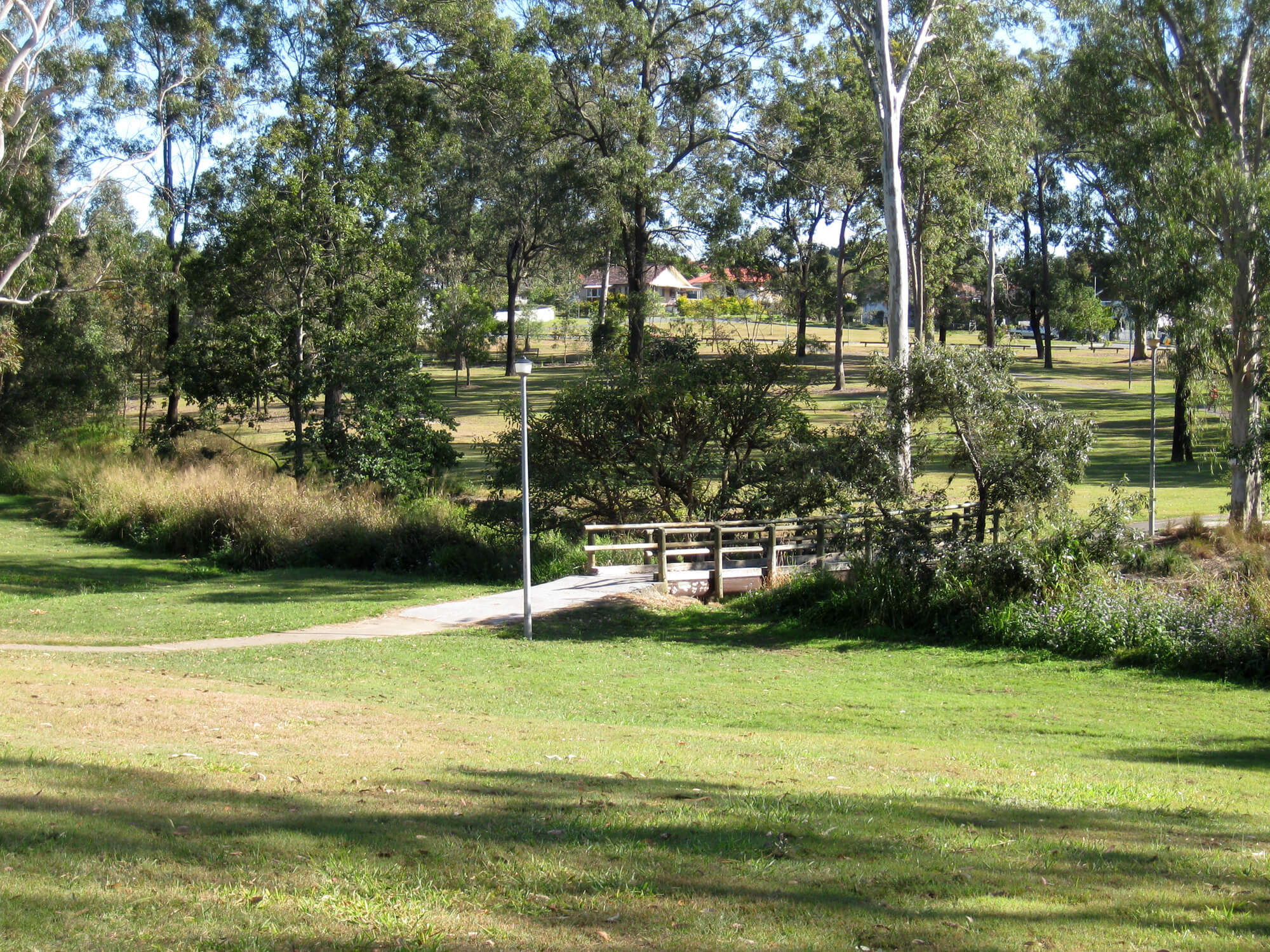
Kev Hooper park, Inala

Inala has a high ratio of green areas and parks, most of which are named after prominent people who helped establish the suburb or contributed to the community. The parks and the large numbers of grown native trees through the suburb maintain the ecosystem of Inala, quiet environment and clean air.

Special pedestrian walkways between residential houses facilitate residents' access to bus stops, schools, shops and recreational areas. Inala has four dog parks with fenced off-leash areas, shelters, benches and water taps, located at Kev Hooper Park on Lavender Street, at Richlands Depot Park on Government Road, on the corner of Inala Avenue and Sycamore Street, and on Kimberley Street near C.J. Greenfield Park.

=== Places of worship ===
In 2016 Census, 31.3% of Inala residents stated no religious affiliation, followed by Inala's two major religious affiliations: Catholic (21.2%) and Buddhism (13.8%).

Inala Uniting Church is at 29 Berrigan Street. It is part of the Bremer Brisbane Presbytery of the Uniting Church in Australia.

Samoa Methodist Church Inala is at 472 Archerfield Road (27.5945°S 152.9600°E).

Inala Samoan Church conduct their services at the Old Inala Hall on the corner of Abelia Street and Rosemary Street (27.5901°S 152.9765°E); it is part of the Wesleyan Methodist Church.

Inala Tongan Church conduct their services at the Seventh Day Adventist Church at 124 Crocus Street (27.5881°S 152.9750°E); it is part of the Wesleyan Methodist Church.

Forest Lake Samoan Church conduct their services on the corner of Corsair Avenue and Inala Avenue (approx 27.5976°S 152.9756°E); it is part of the Wesleyan Methodist Church.

Other churches and religious places in the suburb include:

- Anglican Church, St Hugh's Parish Inala
- Assemblies of God (Australian Christian Churches)
- Buddhist Temple Chùa Pháp Quang
- Buddhist Temple Chùa Phật Đà
- Church of Jesus Christ of Latter-day Saints
- Christian Reformation Community Church
- Citipointe West Church
- Gospel Hall
- Great Hope Baptist Church
- Multi-Cultural Baptist Church
- Place of Peace Church of the Nazarene
- Salvation Army
- Seventh-day Adventist Church
- St Mark's Catholic Parish
- Sikh Temple Guru Nanak Gurdwara
- Vietnamese Catholic Community Brisbane (Cộng Đồng Công Giáo Việt Nam Brisbane)
- Vietnamese English Baptist Church (Hội Thánh Tinh Lành Báp-tít Việt-Anh)

=== Sports ===
Sport and recreation facilities include a Police Citizens Youth Club gym and fitness centre, a number of Brisbane City Council parks and recreation areas, sport ovals and facilities, and the Inala Skate Park (D.J. Sherrington Park).

Other sporting clubs include:

- Blue Fin Fishing Club
- Brisbane Lions Soccer Club
- West Inala Panthers Rugby League Football Club
- West Inala Panthers Junior Rugby League Football Club

== Transport ==
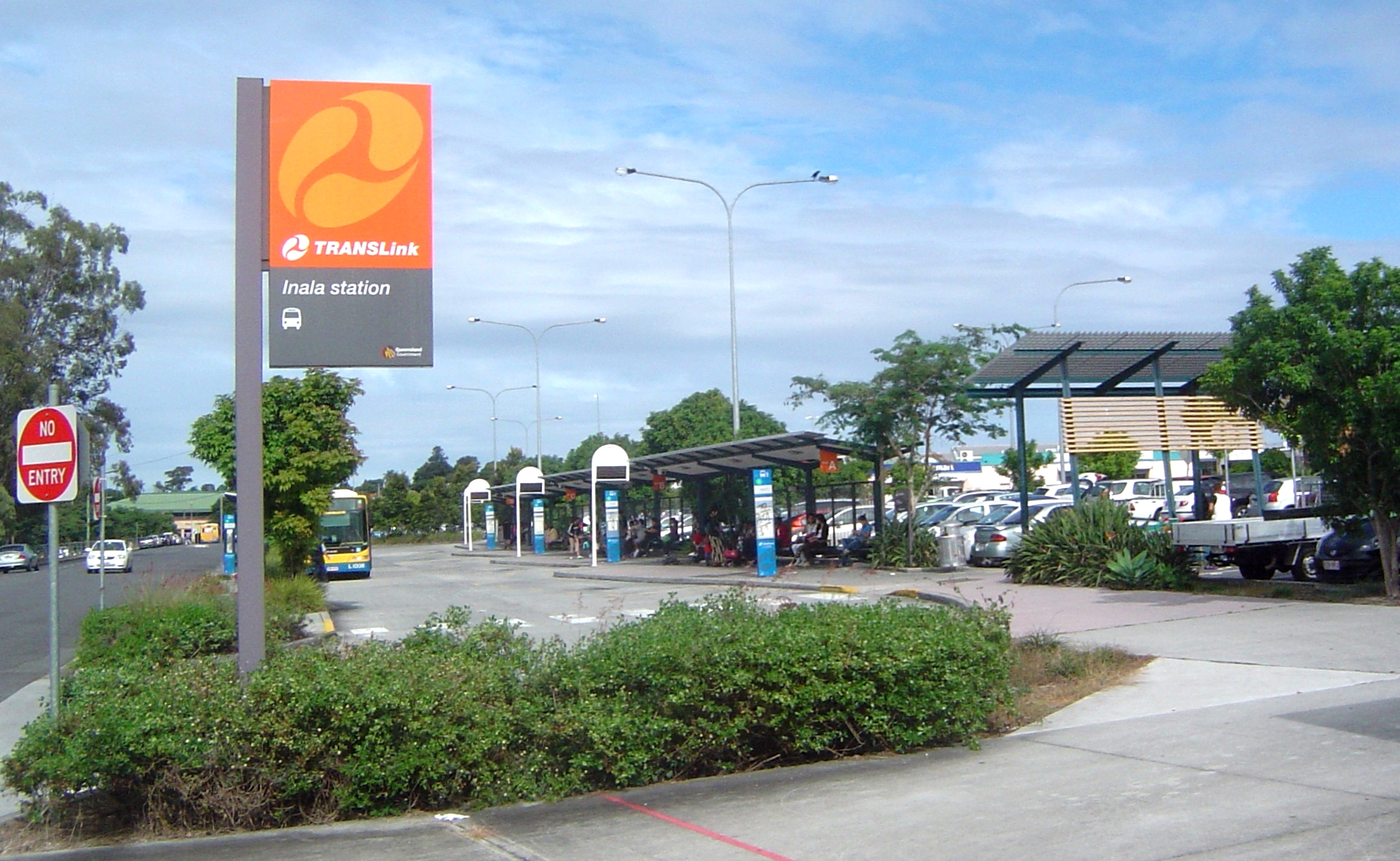
Bus station at Inala Plaza

Buses conduct services from Inala bus station near the Inala Plaza shopping centre through the Inala suburb, to railway stations nearest to Inala: Richlands, Darra, Oxley, to Forest Lake Village Shopping Centre, Mount Ommaney Shopping Centre, Garden City Shopping Centre, Princess Alexandra Hospital and QEII Hospital. Richlands railway station opened in 2011 and is now Inala's closest rail link, approximately 3 kilometres (1.9 mi) from central Inala. Paths for easy pedestrian and bike access from Inala to Richlands station are set in the area development plan. Inala also has bus connections to Salisbury, Moorooka and Coopers Plains railway stations, and to Woolloongabba busway station, South Bank and the Brisbane City via the frequent express bus route 100 that operates from early morning until late night.

Inala has a very good access to Ipswich Motorway, Centenary Motorway and Logan Motorway, and further to Warrego Highway and Cunningham Highway.

== Political representation ==
Les Bryant, former ALP Richlands Ward Councillor, represented Inala in the Brisbane City Council for 17 years, 1991–2008. Les was succeeded by Milton Dick (Australian Labor Party) in 2008, who moved into Federal politics winning the Federal Division of Oxley in 2016. Charles Strunk (ALP) won the renamed old Ward of Richlands, now Forest Lake Ward, in 2016, to become the new Brisbane City Councillor for Forest Lake Ward. Annastacia Palaszczuk (ALP) was the Member of the Queensland Legislative Assembly for Inala from 2006 to 2023; she became Premier of Queensland in 2015 and retained her position until her retirement in 2023. A by-election was held in March 2024 to elect Margie Nightingale. She retained her seat in the 2024 Queensland state election

== Architecture ==
The development of Inala coincided with the emergence of architectural modernism in Australia. The innovative designs of young southern architects such as Robin Boyd, Roy Grounds and Harry Seidler featured the efficient use of space with minimal ornamentation, utilisation of new materials and techniques, and above all design simplicity, while striving to build solid houses that would require little maintenance. Inala was designed and built in Modernist Revival style with elements of Art Deco. It was both aesthetically successful and a practical architectural solution.

The post-war worldwide shortage of building materials coupled with huge demands created the impetus for exploring and using new materials and techniques in Inala. The choice to use reinforced concrete in the construction of Inala houses was made because of its strength, reliability and flexibility. Inala also had the advantage of good access to the local cement and concrete made from washed river sand and lime from Moreton Bay coral shipped up the river by barge and processed at Darra. Concrete was an ideal material for the fashionable Modernist style. Inala houses were built on raised concrete foundations, framed with hardwood timber, floored with hard-wearing brushbox, with silky oak used for window frames. The outer walls were constructed of poured concrete approximately 18 cm thick, internal walls and ceilings – with rendered wire lath. These robust construction techniques also served to minimise maintenance costs and achieve a long life span of the houses.

== Notable residents ==
Former Inala resident, Joanna Lindgren was an LNP Australian Senator for Queensland in 2015 and 2016; the niece of Neville Bonner AO, Joanna is the first Aboriginal female Senator for Queensland.
