= Glenala State High School =

Coordinates: 27°35′09″S 152°58′45″E

- Brisbane, Queensland; Australia

Information
- School type: Co-education, secondary, public, day school
- Motto: Believe and Achieve
- Principal: Michelle Campbell
- Enrolment: 1,053 (2023)
- Campus: Urban (Inala)
- Website: glenalashs.eq.edu.au

Glenala State High School is a public, co-educational, high school, located on Glenala Road in Durack, Brisbane, Queensland, Australia, on the border with Inala. It is administered by the Department of Education, with an enrolment of 1,053 students and a teaching staff of 96, as of 2023. The school serves students from Year 7 to Year 12.

== History ==
The school was opened on 29 January 1996 after a full amalgamation of both students from Inala State High School (30 January 1962 – 15 December 1995) and the Year 8, 9, and 11 students at Richlands State High School (27 January 1970 – 13 December 1996). In 1997, all students from Richlands State High School were transferred to Glenala.

=== Inala State High School ===
The school motto for Inala State High School was "Onward and Upward." In 1973, a student was killed, 13 others were injured, including the teacher, after a science experiment had gone wrong.

=== Richlands State High School ===
As of 2007, the land where the school was once located was a development site.

In 2004, low motivation and attendance at Glenala was an evident problem; however, after the brief eleven-week program "The Band Thing: Bringing New Styles," an improvement in 'student behaviour, focus and attendance' was seen.

== Notable alumni ==
=== Inala State High School (1962–1995) ===
- Wayne Goss, Australian Politician; former Queensland Premier.
