= Sinnamon Farm =

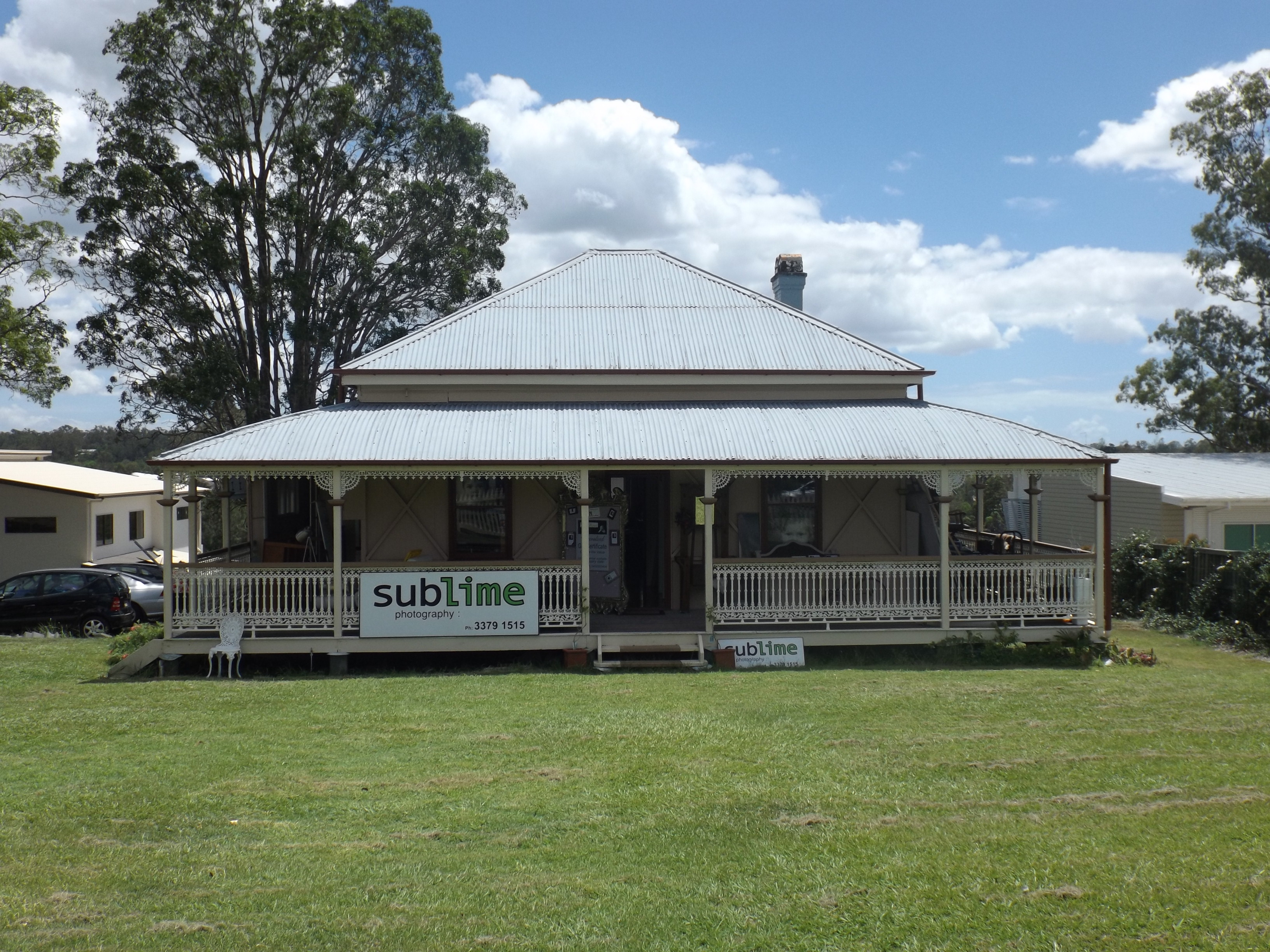
- Avondale in 2014

- Location within Queensland Location within Australia
- 27.5382°S 152.9519°E
- Location: 645 & 693 Seventeen Mile Rocks Road, Sinnamon Park, City of Brisbane, Queensland, Australia

History
- Design period: 1840s–1860s (mid-19th century)
- Built: 1869–1890s

Queensland Heritage Register
- Official name: Sinnamon Farm, Avondale and Macleod aviation site, Beechwood, Glen Ross and Seventeen Mile Rocks School, 600237, 600234, 600236
- Type: state heritage (archaeological, built)
- Designated: 21 October 1992
- Reference no.: 600233
- Significant period: 1869–1890s (fabric); 1860s–1960s, 1910 (historical)
- Significant components: shed – storage, farmhouse, shed – shelter, objects (movable) – farming, garden – ornamental/flower, trees/plantings, school/school room, plaque, orchard, barn, kitchen/kitchen house, garden – vegetable

Sinnamon Farm is a heritage-listed farm at 645 & 693 Seventeen Mile Rocks Road, Sinnamon Park, City of Brisbane, Queensland, Australia. It was built from 1869 to 1890s. It is also known as Avondale & Macleod aviation site, Beechwood, Glen Ross, and Seventeen Mile Rocks School. It was added to the Queensland Heritage Register on 21 October 1992.

== History ==
The Sinnamon family arrived at Brisbane via Tasmania in 1863. James aged 50 was a well established Northern Ireland farmer of Huguenot origin. With his wife Margaret, seven sons and three daughters, he emigrated for economic betterment and religious freedom. In 1865 the family, including another daughter born en route, settled at Seventeen Mile Rocks on the Mermaid Reach of the Brisbane River.

This area, which had been surveyed into small farms in 1864, sold rapidly due to economic buoyancy and peak immigration during the early 1860s. To the initial parcel of 20 acres (portion 302) purchased from William Lovell in 1865, James added adjacent allotments from other vendors. Since land along much of the river was dense sub-tropical rainforest or vine scrub, the family had to clear sufficient farm land by felling and firing. On portion 299 (acquired by James Sinnamon in 1866), the family built a large split slab hut with earthen floor. In addition to using their government land orders totalling £216, the Sinnamons borrowed money for capital improvements, which was repaid within several years. By 1869 they were able to build the more commodious, handsawn timber house further up the hill, known as Beechwood (portion 302).

To construct Beechwood, the family cut and hauled timber from the property to their nearby sawpit. During a hauling trip James was fatally injured when kicked by a horse. His widow Margaret and family completed the building and carried on farming, later erecting other buildings for farming and family purposes. John, the eldest and unmarried son, resided at Beechwood with his mother until her death in 1904 aged 83 and his own demise ten years later. Beechwood has been occupied continuously since 1869, and together with Wolston House (1863) at Wacol, remains one of the oldest residences in the district.

In 1887 a third and more substantial residence, Glen Ross, was constructed to the west of Beechwood on portion 301 for James Jr, the sixth child of James and Margaret Sinnamon, who had acquired title to the land in 1880. James Jr married in December 1887, and the new house, named Glen Ross in reference to the family home in Ireland, was extended over time to accommodate six sons and three daughters. A substantial hay shed was erected on the Glen Ross farm c. 1890, but was burnt down in 1978. After James Jr died in 1942 aged 91, the farming property was purchased, occupied and augmented by their fourth child, Hercules V Sinnamon (later Sir Hercules), a businessman and farmer. HV Sinnamon placed shareholders on the land and continued to maintain the Sinnamon farms.

A fourth residence, Avondale, on portion 304 to the east of Beechwood, was erected in the 1890s for Benjamin Sinnamon, the ninth child, who purchased the property in 1886 from other family members. He married Elizabeth Annie Primrose in 1889, and they and their six children resided at Avondale. Following Benjamin's death in 1941, the property continued operating on a share farm basis.

George, the third of James and Margaret Sinnamon's children, purchased Rosemount, a sixteen-acre property on the opposite side of Seventeen Mile Rocks Road, where an avenue of mango trees remains (portion 313). Rosemount burnt down about 1970, after which the property was presented to the Methodist Church, which erected the Sinnamon Retirement Village on the site.

Altogether the Sinnamon farms produced a wide range of primary produce, commencing with sugarcane and cotton, then maize, potatoes, pineapples and dairy produce, while concentrating in later years on breeding horses and cattle, especially pure jersey stock.

The Sinnamon family also took a leading part in local affairs, in particular with the establishment of the Seventeen Mile Rocks School and the local church (Sinnamon Memorial Uniting Church), and Benjamin Sinnamon served on the Sherwood Shire Council.

As children in the Seventeen Mile Rocks area had to journey to Corinda to school, a provisional school was built in Goggs Road as early as 1870. This building of split timber with furnishings was supplied by local farmers in accordance with the Education Act of the same year. By 1876 local residents had collected sufficient funds to erect a new school facing Goggs Road on the southeast corner of portion 316, about 100 metres (330 ft) south of the original site. This building was completed in 1877 by Wilson Henry, local resident and cousin to the Sinnamon family, and opened at the beginning of the 1878 school year with 32 pupils. The schoolhouse was complemented by a detached shelter shed and a teacher's residence. In the early 1900s the interior of the schoolhouse was lined with narrow tongue and groove boards and its shingled roof was replaced with corrugated galvanised iron. The school finally closed in 1966, when Jindalee State School opened. The building was sold subsequently to Hercules Sinnamon, who offered it as headquarters for the Indooroopilly Rural Youth Club. Generations of the Sinnamon family had attended the school and been involved in its development, particularly HV Sinnamon's father, James Jr, who was the school committee's first treasurer, and his uncle Benjamin, who was chairman of the school committee for forty years. The school (without its teacher's residence) was moved from crown land to HV Sinnamon's property in the late 1980s and has been used since by school groups as an interactive museum.

Sinnamon Farm was the venue for pioneering glider flights and the first officially observed flight in Queensland of a heavier-than-air machine, undertaken by Thomas Macleod on the slopes of portions 303 and 298 in 1910. These events were commemorated in 1970 by the erection of a plaque adjacent to the now relocated school.

From the 1960s some Sinnamon land was sold for inclusion in the new suburb of Jindalee, but all of the family property between Seventeen Mile Rocks Road and the Brisbane River was retained, principally through the efforts of HV Sinnamon. In order to preserve his family's history and heritage in the Seventeen Mile Rocks area, HV Sinnamon opposed the proposal for a cross-river bridge through the remaining farmland, shifted the threatened former state school onto his property, and published a history of the Sinnamon family. In the mid-1960s he also donated land for the relocation of the threatened Seventeen Mile Rocks Church. In 1994, HV Sinnamon died at the age of 94 years.

Despite Hercules Sinnamon's commitment to retaining the area as farmland, after his death, the land was sold for development of residential housing estates. In 2011 a masterplan was created to redevelop the heritage-listed buildings Glen Ross, Beechwood and the former Seventeen Mile Rocks School as residences with work underway in 2014.

== Description ==
Sinnamon Farm comprises all of the buildings, structures, sites, objects, planting and land associated with the Sinnamon family within the heritage register boundary. This includes the following:

- Beechwood (1869), a gable-roofed, verandahed house and planting.

This farm house comprises four bedrooms and a parlour, and is a typical timber dwelling of the Separation period, although the detached kitchen and stables no longer exist. The front and back verandah roofs are joined continuously to the main gable roof, its split hardwood shingles now covered by corrugated galvanised iron. The front verandah is plainly furnished with square stick balustrading. Four pairs of French doors open onto this verandah. The house is constructed of pitswan timber, adzed and otherwise shaped on the property. This includes internal cedar joinery, and hardwood log bearers which run the width of the house on stumps, their ends protruding beyond the walls. The rear verandah or skillion has been modified. The early formal garden has long gone, but several old bunya pines line the river front.

- Glen Ross (1887), a short ridge-roofed, verandahed house and attached kitchen house, with outbuildings, fencing and formal garden.

The residence to the west of Beechwood is a typical late 19th century Queensland house. Beneath its short-ridge roof of corrugated galvanised iron and rear extension are twelve rooms, a number of which have been created by enclosing parts of the encircling verandahs. Wide front and side verandahs are ornamented with cast iron balustrading and brackets between timber posts, and the rear verandah has simple dowel balustrading. The exposed stud frame of the main house, which is lined on the inside with vertical tongue and groove boards, is accentuated by a large cross brace on either side of each four-paned sash window. Joinery throughout is of cedar. Two chimneys serve fireplaces in the parlour and the present kitchen. The attached former kitchen house has a separate corrugated iron hipped roof and verandahs to each side, but the western verandah is enclosed. This wing is clad in weatherboards, and retains its brick chimney at the northern end. The whole house is complemented internally by period furnishings and family mementoes, and externally by timber fencing and planting. The latter comprises a formal front garden, rear vegetable beds, an orchard to the east including persimmon and a large Moreton Bay fig tree near the front gate. To the west a group of outbuildings provides shelter for various vehicles and implements, including the early Sinnamon family plough of bush timber and iron share. An adjacent shed of vertical slabs survives, as well as more recent structures.

Glen Ross is an intact, cohesive and maintained farm house which retains its original character and has been extended sympathetically over time to accommodate a family on the land.

- Avondale (c. 1890s), a short ridge-roofed, verandahed house, with outbuildings.

To the east of Beechwood is Avondale, another late 19th century Queensland farmhouse which is similar in form to Glen Ross. Built of timber and corrugated iron, Avondale has wide verandahs on all sides and is ornamented with cast iron balustrading, brackets, and a small cast-iron valance between the timber posts. The rear and parts of the side verandahs have been enclosed. Its exposed stud frame, which is lined on the inside with vertical tongue and groove boards, is accentuated by a large cross brace on either side of each four-paned sash window. Avondale has fewer main rooms than Glen Ross, and the walls of four inch vertically jointed boards and the rear projection indicate a later construction period. Outbuildings to the west include an old slab and corrugated iron barn with a recent extension. There are the stone remnants of a circular horse-powered mill race to the west of the house.

- Former Seventeen Mile Rocks School (1877), a relocated gable-roofed, verandahed building, with shelter shed.

The one-roomed 28-by-16-foot (8.5 m × 4.9 m) school building now set on a concrete block base was typical for a rural locality. It is an unadorned, front and back verandahed, gable roofed structure with weatherboard cladding and a corrugated galvanised iron roof. The ceiling is lined with diagonal tongue and groove sheeting and the interior walls are lined with narrow vertically jointed tongue and groove boards. The original front window sashes have been replaced with casements. Early furnishings include student desks and benches. The schoolhouse is complemented by a detached hip-roofed, corrugated iron-covered shelter shed.

- Macleod aviation site (1910), location of the pioneering glider flights and first officially observed flight in Queensland of a heavier-than-air machine by Thomas Macleod (on the slopes of portions 303 and 298), as commemorated by a plaque (1970) adjacent to the now relocated school.

== Heritage listing ==
Sinnamon Farm was listed on the Queensland Heritage Register on 21 October 1992 having satisfied the following criteria.

The place is important in demonstrating the evolution or pattern of Queensland's history.

Sinnamon Farm is significant historically because it illustrates the early phase of rural settlement and land use which took place along reaches of the Brisbane River and other Queensland waterways from the 1860s to the 1890s, especially the clearing of rainforest for "scrub farms", the ensuing pattern of farming, and the growth of community life centred on the family, school and church. In particular, the farm survives as illustration of the evolution, association and location within a single family of a small grouping of farm dwellings, outbuildings and associated community buildings.

The place demonstrates rare, uncommon or endangered aspects of Queensland's cultural heritage.

The buildings, structures, sites, objects, and plantings of Sinnamon Farm form a rare rural grouping within a late 20th century suburban district in Brisbane, and are important in illustrating a past way of life. As a farming landscape, with a developmental sequence of 19th century buildings and structures, Sinnamon Farm forms a rare and distinctive grouping in Brisbane.

The place is important in demonstrating the principal characteristics of a particular class of cultural places.

The principal buildings and structures of Sinnamon Farm include a gable-roofed house of the late 1860s, two 1880s-90s residences, slab outbuildings and an 1870s gable-roofed schoolhouse. These are typical timber buildings of what was once rural Queensland, and in their intactness are important in demonstrating the principal characteristics of their type.

The place has a special association with the life or work of a particular person, group or organisation of importance in Queensland's history.

Sinnamon Farm is important for its strong association with the Sinnamon family, which has been prominent in local affairs, the development of the district and many other fields of public endeavour since the 1860s.
