= Sinnamon Memorial Uniting Church =

- Seventeen Mile Rocks Church
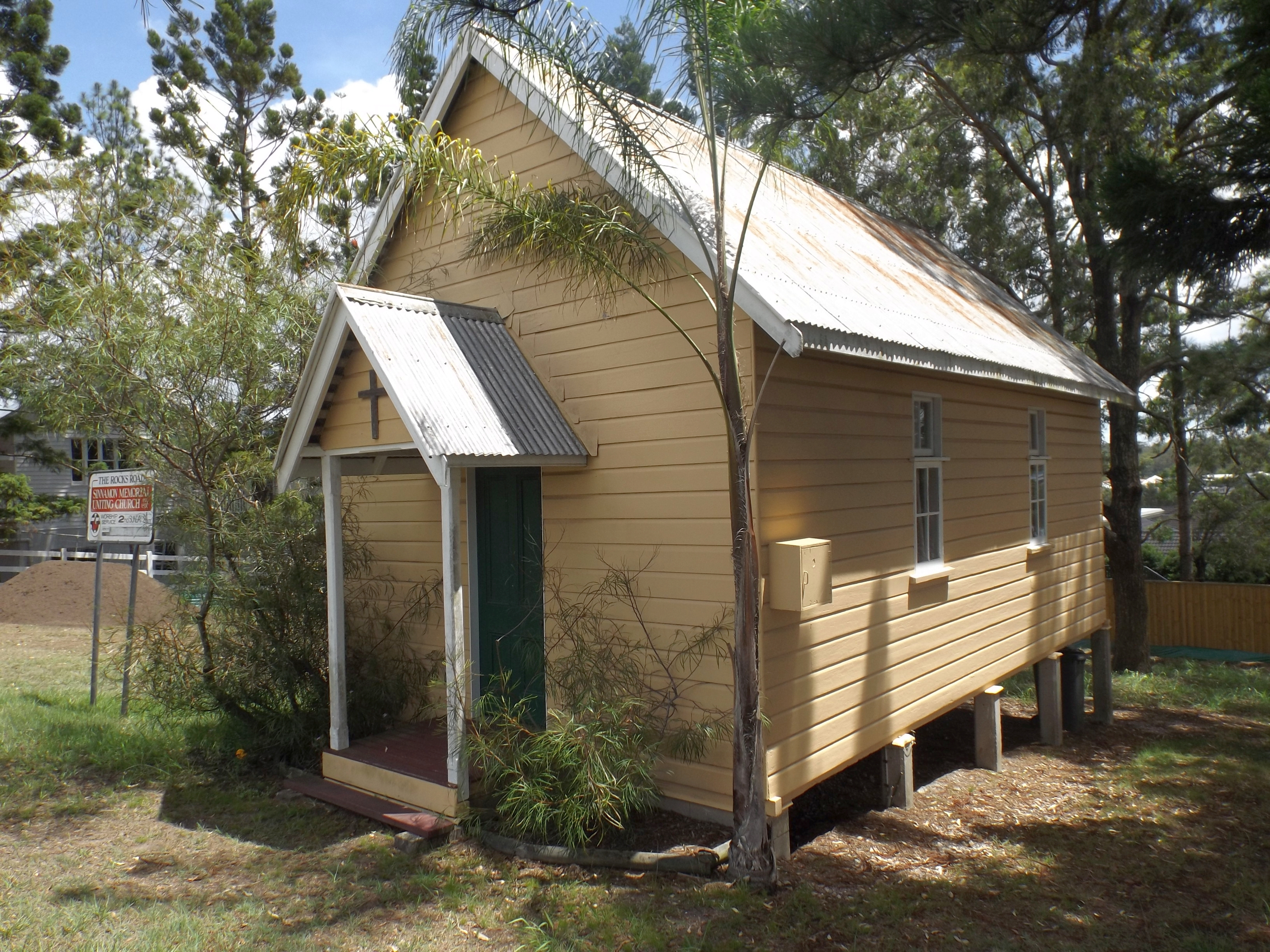
- Sinnamon Memorial Uniting Church, 2014
- Sinnamon Memorial Uniting Church
- 27°32′18″S 152°57′06″E
- Address: 675 Seventeen Mile Rocks Road, Sinnamon Park, City of Brisbane, Queensland
- Country: Australia
- Denomination: Uniting
- Previous denomination: Methodist

History
- Former name: Rocks Road Sinnamon Memorial Methodist Church
- Status: Church

Architecture
- Completed: 1888

Specifications
- Materials: Chamferboard; corrugated iron

Administration
- Parish: Centenary (Middle Park)

Queensland Heritage Register
- Official name: Sinnamon Memorial Uniting Church, Seventeen Mile Rocks Church
- Type: State heritage (built)
- Designated: 21 October 1992
- Reference no.: 600235
- Significant period: 1888 (fabric); 1888-1966 (historical)
- Significant components: Furniture/fittings
- Builders: Wilson Henry

Sinnamon Memorial Uniting Church is a heritage-listed Uniting church at 675 Seventeen Mile Rocks Road, Sinnamon Park, City of Brisbane, Queensland, Australia. It was built in 1888 by Wilson Henry. It is also known as Seventeen Mile Rocks Church. It was added to the Queensland Heritage Register on 21 October 1992.

== History ==
In 1888, this building replaced a small bark and shingle chapel erected in 1880 at the corner of Goggs and Seventeen Mile Rocks Road, adjacent to the former Seventeen Mile Rocks School. The builder was Wilson Henry, a local resident and a cousin to the Sinnamon family, pioneers of the Seventeen Mile Rocks area since the mid-1860s. The new building was intended for use by the Church of England, but as the church was unable to supply a clergyman, the congregation was served by the Primitive Methodist Church of Ipswich, whose minister arrived by rowboat. By the 1950s the congregation had dwindled to sisters Edith and Isobel Sinnamon. In 1966, the western extension of Seventeen Mile Rocks Road to the new suburb of Jindalee necessitated relocation of the building, which was moved onto land donated by Hercules V. Sinnamon from the Sinnamon family's original 1865 holding. Two years later the chapel re-opened as the Rocks Road Sinnamon Memorial Methodist Church and though lacking a regular congregation, it served for occasional functions. In 1980, the church centenary was commemorated by the planting of pine trees around the perimeter. Since the Sinnamon family and their relatives had filled most church positions over the years, the building was aptly re-sited and renamed.

== Description ==
This small chamferboard building sits on concrete stumps well back from Seventeen Mile Rocks Road, on a grassed site with recent perimeter pine plantings. It has a simple rectangular plan, with a small front porch. The high-pitched gabled main roof and front porch roof were shingled originally, but these have been replaced with corrugated iron. The ceiling is lined with six inch tongue and groove boards and the walls are strengthened by two iron tie-bars. The frame, which was exposed on the inside, is now boarded and sheeted internally. Early furnishings include four silver-plated kerosene lamps with tin shades, a medium-sized harmonium and a simple pulpit of vertically jointed cedar raised on a dais with two steps on either side. Seating only sixty persons on twelve pine pews (now painted), this was a typical small rural chapel.

== Heritage listing ==
Sinnamon Memorial Uniting Church was listed on the Register of the National Trust of Australia (Queensland) on 24 November 1980; included on the Queensland Heritage Buildings Protection Act (1990) schedule; listed on the Queensland Heritage Register on 21 October 1992; and subsequently, in 2000, listed on the Brisbane Heritage Register.

When listed on the Queensland Heritage Register in 1992, it satisfied the following criteria.

The place is important in demonstrating the evolution or pattern of Queensland's history.

The Rocks Road Sinnamon Memorial Uniting Church is significant for its social and spiritual role in the evolution of the Seventeen Mile Rocks area as a close-knit farming community in the second half of the 19th century.

The place demonstrates rare, uncommon or endangered aspects of Queensland's cultural heritage.

The building is important for its contribution to a rare surviving rural landscape in Brisbane, created by a group of late 19th century farm houses, church, school and school house, other farm structures and farm land along Seventeen Mile Rocks Road and Goggs Road, within a highly planned late 20th century suburban district.

The place is important in demonstrating the principal characteristics of a particular class of cultural places.

The building survives as a good example of a small, late 19th century rural chapel and retains a strong connection with the Seventeen Mile Rocks locality.

The place has a special association with the life or work of a particular person, group or organisation of importance in Queensland's history.

In particular, the church has a close association with the Sinnamon family, who were amongst the earliest settlers in the district and have retained a strong presence in the area.
