= Sinnamon Park =

- Suburb
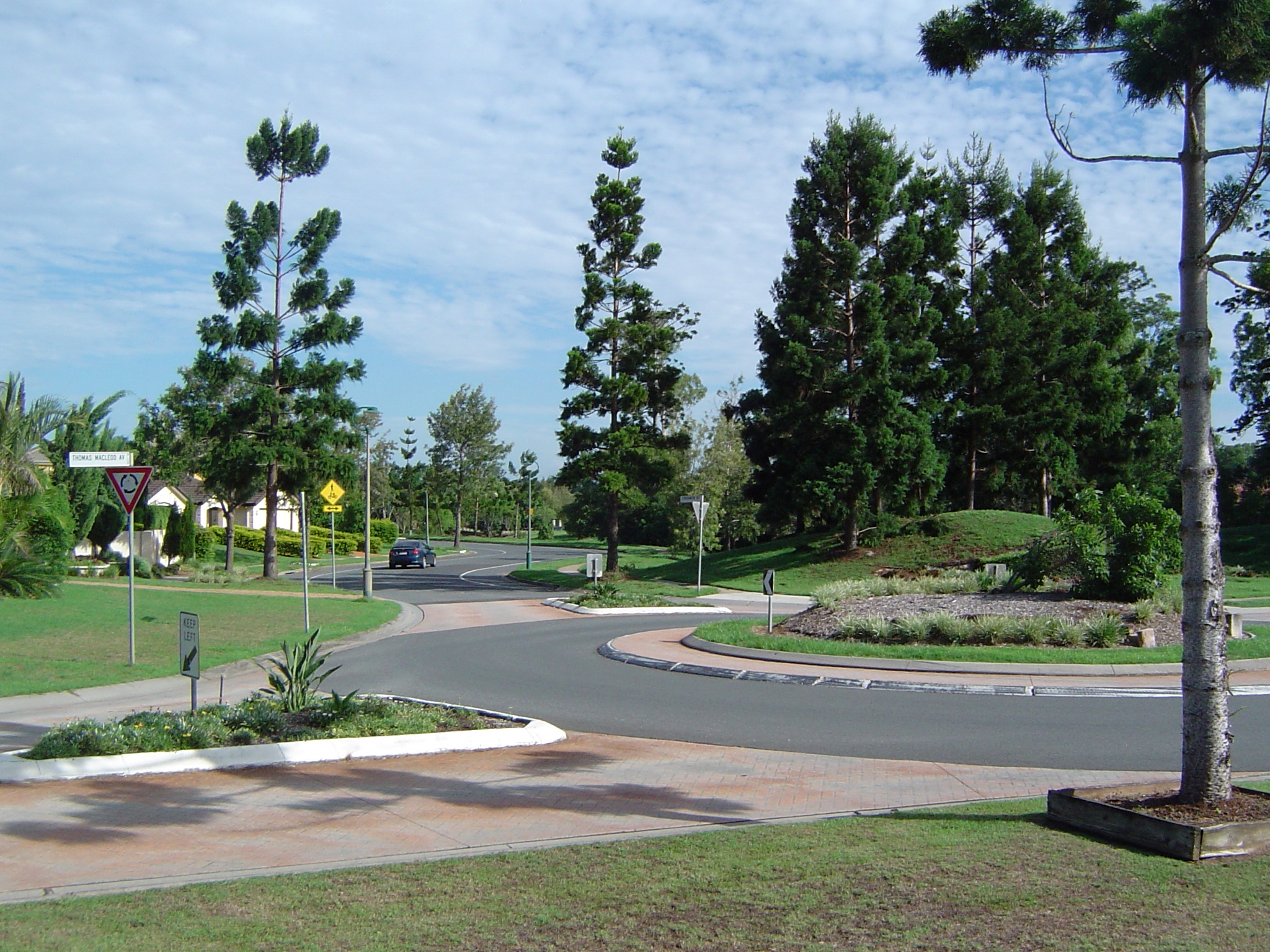
- Sinnamon Road and roundabout

- Interactive map of Sinnamon Park
- Coordinates: 27.5452°S 152.9480°E
- Country: Australia
- State: Queensland
- City: Brisbane
- LGA: City of Brisbane (Jamboree Ward)
- Location: 14.0 km (8.7 mi) SW of Brisbane CBD

Government
  - State electorate: Mount Ommaney
  - Federal division: Oxley

Area
  - Total: 3.0 km^{2} (1.2 sq mi)

Population
  - Total: 6,590 (2021 census)
  - Density: 2,200/km^{2} (5,690/sq mi)
- Time zone: UTC+10:00 (AEST)
- Postcode: 4073
Suburbs around Sinnamon Park
Jindalee	Fig Tree Pocket	Fig Tree Pocket
Mount Ommaney	Sinnamon Park	Seventeen Mile Rocks
Jamboree Heights; Sumner	Darra	Seventeen Mile Rocks

Sinnamon Park is a suburb in the City of Brisbane, Queensland, Australia. In the 2021 census, Sinnamon Park had a population of 6,590 people.

== Geography ==
Sinnamon Park is 14 kilometres (8.7 mi) by road south-west of the Brisbane CBD.

The suburb is bounded to the north by the median of the Brisbane River. It is partly bounded to the east by the Jindalee Creek riparian zone and mostly to the west by the Western Freeway.

The land use is residential.

== History ==
In 1879, the local government area of Yeerongpilly Division was created. In 1891, parts of Yeerongpilly Division were excised to create Sherwood Division becoming a Shire in 1903 which contained the area of Wolston Estate. In 1925, the Shire of Sherwood was amalgamated into the City of Brisbane.

A portion of Sinnamon Park was formerly part of the Wolston Estate, consisting of 54 farms on an area of 3,000 acres, offered for auction at Centennial Hall, Brisbane, on 16 October 1901. Wolston Estate was the property of M. B. Goggs, whose father obtained the land forty years previously in the 1860s and after whom Goggs Road is named. Only three of the farms sold at the original auction.

The suburb of Sinnamon Park was officially named and bounded on 13 May 1989, with the land excised from the suburb of Seventeen Mile Rocks. Sinnamon Park is named for the pioneering Sinnamon family headed by James and Margaret Sinnamon. The land occupied by Sinnamon Village retirement complex and the river flats east of the Centenary Freeway were formerly their family farm.

== Demographics ==
In the 2011 census, Sinnamon Park had a population of 6,362 people, 53.4% female and 46.6% male. The median age of the Sinnamon Park population was 39 years, 2 years above the Australian median. 61.1% of people living in Sinnamon Park were born in Australia, compared to the national average of 69.8%; the next most common countries of birth were England 5.3%, New Zealand 3%, India 2.7%, South Africa 2.5%, Vietnam 2.5%. 72.2% of people spoke only English at home; the next most common languages were 3.7% Vietnamese, 3% Mandarin, 2% Cantonese, 1.7% Hindi, 1.1% Persian (excluding Dari).

In the 2016 census, Sinnamon Park had a population of 6,419 people.

In the 2021 census, Sinnamon Park had a population of 6,590 people.

== Heritage listings ==
Sinnamon Park has a number of heritage-listed sites, including:

- 645 & 693 Seventeen Mile Rocks Road: Sinnamon Farm (including the houses "Avondale", "Beechwood" and "Glen Ross" and Seventeen Mile Rocks School)
- 675 Seventeen Mile Rocks Road: Sinnamon Memorial Uniting Church

== Education ==
There are no schools in Sinnamon Park. The nearest government primary schools are Jindalee State School in neighbouring Jindalee to the north-west, Jamboree Heights State School in neighbouring Jamboree Heights to the south-west, and Darra State School in neighbouring Darra to the south. The nearest government secondary school is Centenary State High School in Jindalee.

== Politics ==
The people of Sinnamon Park are represented in the Queensland Parliament by Jess Pugh, the ALP Member for Mount Ommaney. In Federal Parliament, their representative is Milton Dick, ALP member for Oxley and Speaker of the House of Representatives.
