= Rocks Riverside Park =

Park in Queensland, Australia

Coordinates: 27.5429°S 152.9614°E

- Interactive map of Rocks Riverside Park
- Type: Recreation
- Location: Counihan Road, Seventeen Mile Rocks
- Nearest city: Brisbane
- Area: 26 ha (64 acres)
- Created: 7 December 2003
- Operator: Brisbane City Council
- Status: Open
- Awards: 2006 Water Saving Award, 2003 Year of the Built Environment Award, 2003 Innovation Award

Rocks Riverside Park is a park by the Brisbane River in Seventeen Mile Rocks, Brisbane, Queensland, Australia. The park was opened on 7 December 2003, and features industrial artefacts from its previous use by the Queensland Cement and Lime Company. Public art which draws upon the park's industrial heritage are also featured throughout, as is a crop patch which reflects the site's farming days.

Rocks Riverside Park is the largest riverfront park in Brisbane. It has 800 metres of riverfrontage and covers an area of 26 hectare. The park is nestled in amongst other industrial sites at 5 Counihan Road, Seventeen Mile Rocks in Brisbane, Australia.

The project architect was Cenk Yuksel. The main builders were Naturform and Stewart Constructions.

== Features ==
The park is broken into three major zones. There is the river flat, a formerly rich riparian environment, then market garden and industrial site; the bushland range, which forms the backdrop for the river flat area covered with dry eucalypt forest; and a major green link from the park to the suburbs to the south.

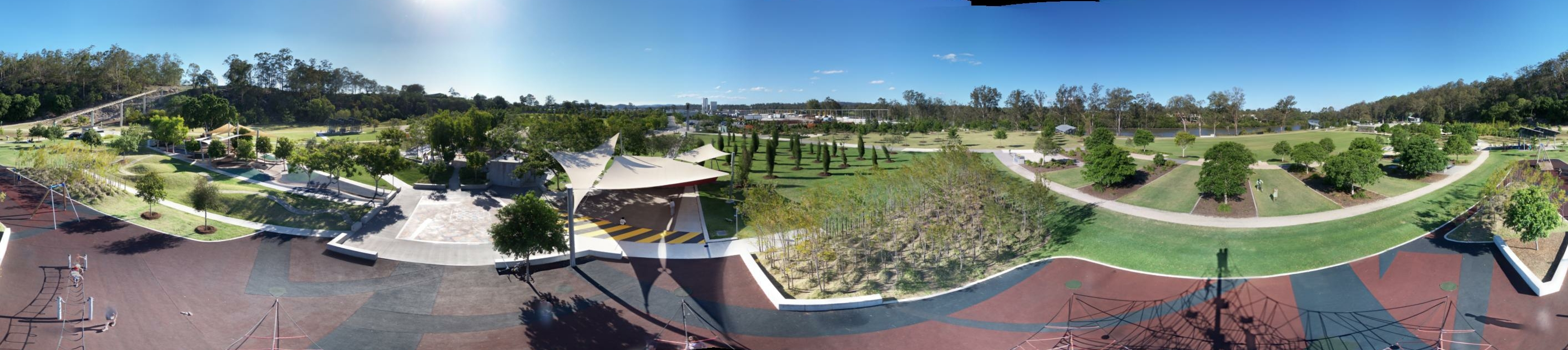
360° Panoramic view of Rocks Riverside Park

Features include a water play area, a flying fox, shelters, lawns, bushland, gardens and electric barbecues. There are also adventure playgrounds, a climbing web, bikeways, a basketball court, a liberty swing for children with disabilities, an amphitheatre, a pavilion, and open spaces for lawn gatherings.

Five areas of the park are available for bookings.

=== Water mining ===
The park features an underground, non-drinking water recycling project. Sewer grinding, ultraviolet disinfection and a reed bed treatment process were used. The treatment process has a low environmental impact, is cost-effective and low-maintenance. The system allows the park to be watered during drought when water restrictions would otherwise apply.

=== Rocks Community Garden ===
Rocks Community Garden is a community garden in Rocks Riverside Park, first established in June 2007. It is volunteer-managed and focused on the organic production of food crops. Community garden membership is open to anyone who supports organic gardening principles and accepts the rules and operating guidelines. The community garden has 34 individual allotments and 9 raised garden beds which plot holders rent on a yearly basis. There is also have a small orchard, which members assist in maintaining.

== History ==
The Rocks Riverside Park area has had many different uses over its lifetime. Irish immigrants, Robert and Frances Henry bought the land and cleared the dense scrub and vine thickets from the site. Sugar Cane, Oats, Barley and Corn were grown on the site until the land was sold in the 1920s. From the late 1940s to the 1960s Tomatoes, Capsicum, Beet and Peanuts were grown by Frank Pettinato, a Sicilian immigrant.

During this time Queensland Cement and Lime Company (QCL) set up their operations in the area, as the site was a good source of fresh water, gravel and sand. Dead coral was brought up the Brisbane River from Moreton Bay as this was found to be a good substitute for lime.

In 1995, the Queensland Government decided not to renew QCL's licence to remove coral from Moreton Bay. The last shipment was received in 1997 and most of the coral used in 1998, resulting in the closure of the plant in 1999.

== Park development ==
Brisbane City Council decided to redevelop the site in 1999. The council's vision for the site was to "create a significant, contemporary riverside park that showcases the innovative design and sustainable management for the enjoyment of all residents."

Hassell was commissioned to generate the initial master plan which was completed in 2000. However, due to a change in design direction, land acquisition and a refinement in the budget the master plan required major alterations. City Design – landscape Architecture was commissioned for the redesign of park to ensure that the park was innovative and sustainable. City Design- Landscape Architecture and Hassel worked together to create the revised master plan.

Signage by Dot Dash creates an identifiable look to the park, whilst complying with Brisbane City Council logo standards. Colours based on an architectural colour scheme provides cohesion throughout the parks built environment and with printed material. The general layouts of the signs are typically light green plates with cut-outs for major headings and white writing for long blocks of information. This plate is always attached to an abstract piece of galvanised steel which has lines of dots running at right angles punctured through it.

== Awards ==
Rocks Riverside Park won the Playground and Recreational Association of Victoria's Innovation Award in 2003.

Brisbane City Council also received a Year of the Built Environment Award from the Australian Institute of Project Management in 2003, recognising the park as "an outstanding example of the Council’s achievements in managing the construction and refurbishment of Brisbane’s built spaces and parklands."

The water mining project won a Water Saving Award from the Department of Infrastructure and Transport in 2006.

== See also ==
- List of parks in Brisbane
