= Fig Tree Pocket =

- Suburb
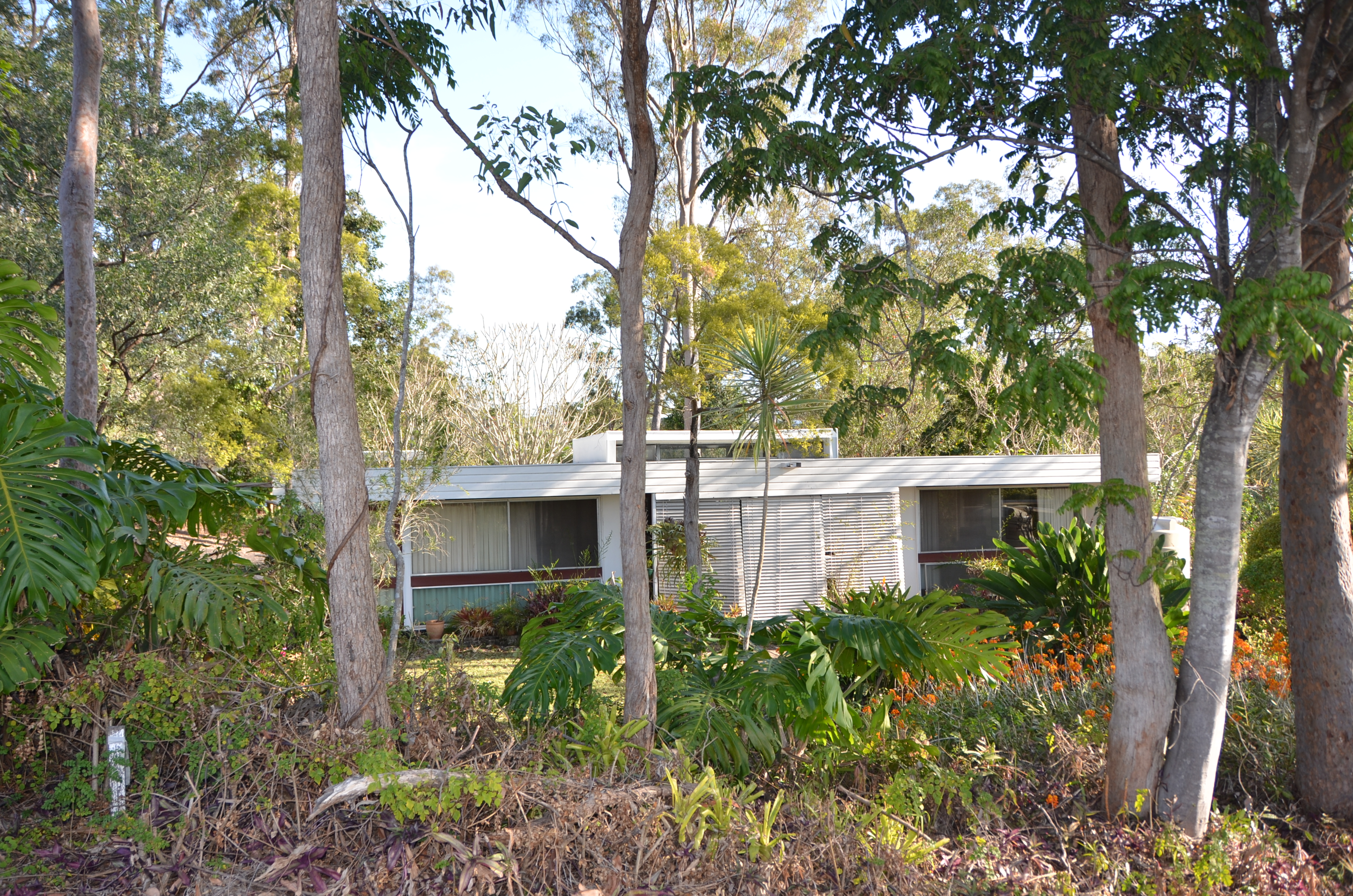
- Dalton House, Fig Tree Pocket

- Interactive map of Fig Tree Pocket
- Coordinates: 27.5275°S 152.9608°E
- Country: Australia
- State: Queensland
- City: Brisbane
- LGA: City of Brisbane (Walter Taylor Ward)
- Location: 13.1 km (8.1 mi) SW of Brisbane CBD

Government
  - State electorate: Maiwar
  - Federal division: Ryan

Area
  - Total: 5.0 km^{2} (1.9 sq mi)

Population
  - Total: 4,345 (2021 census)
  - Density: 869/km^{2} (2,251/sq mi)
- Time zone: UTC+10:00 (AEST)
- Postcode: 4069
Suburbs around Fig Tree Pocket
Chapel Hill	Indooroopilly	Chelmer
Kenmore	Fig Tree Pocket	Graceville; Sherwood
Jindalee; Sinnamon Park	Seventeen Mile Rocks; Oxley	Chelmer

Fig Tree Pocket is a riverside western suburb in the City of Brisbane, Queensland, Australia. In the 2021 census, Fig Tree Pocket had a population of 4,345 people.

Lone Pine Koala Sanctuary is the oldest and largest koala sanctuary in the world. It is a tourist and education centre.

== Geography ==
The suburb is located on a river pocket along the northern bank of Brisbane River. It is bounded to the east, south and west by the median of the river. The north-western boundary, the Centenary Motorway. It is 13.1 kilometres (8.1 mi) by road south-west of the Brisbane CBD.

Sherwood Reach is the reach of the Brisbane River to the east of the suburb (27.5283°S 152.9716°E), while Mermaid Reach is to the west (27.5280°S 152.9486°E).

== History ==
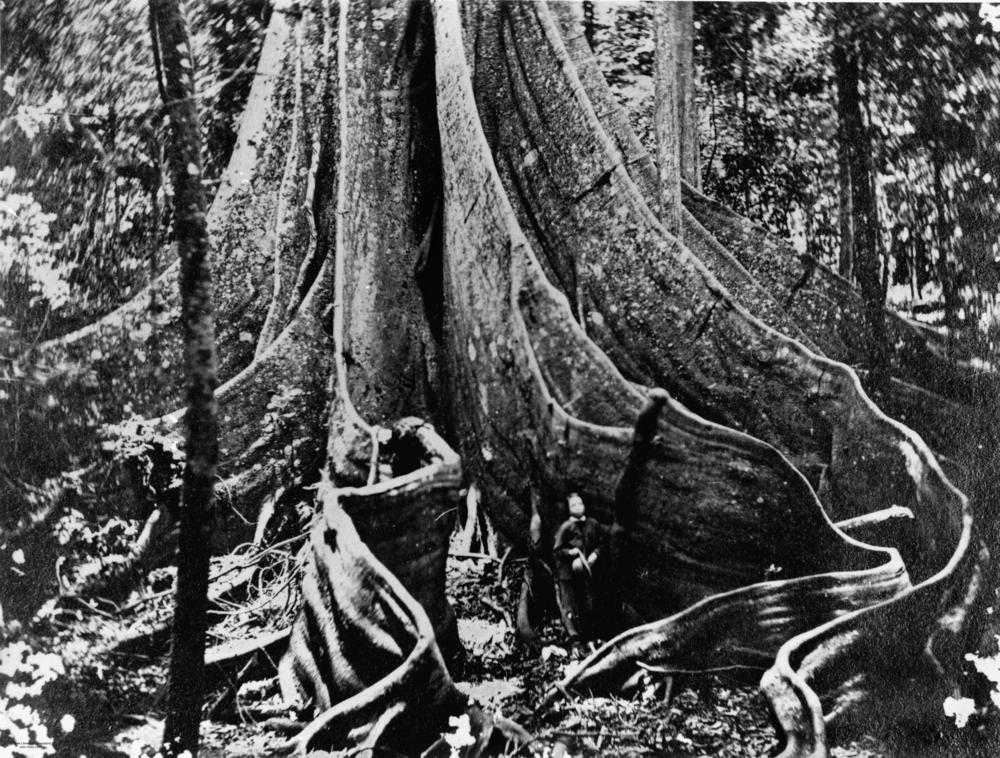
The large fig tree, 1866

John Oxley explored the Brisbane River in November 1823. He named Mermaid Reach after HM Colonial Cutter Mermaid, which brought his exploration party to Moreton Bay.

The suburb takes its name from the Moreton Bay fig trees (Ficus macrophylla). In 1866, one particular fig tree in the area was photographed and described as able to shelter 400 people. In 1866, a reserve of 1.6 hectares (4.0 acres) was created around the fig tree. The tree no longer exists but the circumstances of its disappearance are not known.

Fig Tree Pocket State School opened on 4 September 1871.

A post office opened in 1878.

Lone Pine Koala Sanctuary was established in 1927 by Claude Reid with two koalas called Jack and Jill. It takes its name from the large hoop pine that is beside the ticket entrance.

The Glenleighden School opened on 1 February 1979.

Brisbane Montessori School opened in 1982.

In early 2009, one luxury property sold for A$9.5 million and another sold for A$7.15 million.

The suburb was one of those in Brisbane which were affected during the 2010–11 Queensland floods. Following the floods, a riverfront estate sold for $8.25 million at Ningana Street in May 2014 which set a record for the highest price achieved after the natural disaster.

== Demographics ==
In the 2016 census, Fig Tree Pocket had a population of 4,045 people, 49.9% female and 50.1% male. The median age of the Fig Tree Pocket population was 40 years of age, three years above the Australian median. 66.8% of people living in Fig Tree Pocket were born in Australia, which is very close to the national average of 66.7%. The other top responses for country of birth were England 6.2%, South Africa 4.0%, New Zealand 3.0%, United States of America 1.3%, and India 1.3%. 84.3% of people speak only English at home; the next most popular languages were Mandarin 1.7%, German 0.9%, Afrikaans 0.8%, Spanish 0.7%, and Hindi 0.7%. 47.5% of people aged 15 years and over in Fig Tree Pocket had completed a bachelor's degree or higher, which is significantly more than the national 22.0%. "No Religion" was the top response for religious affiliation, with 31.5% of the population. Catholic and Anglican were the next highest religious affiliations with 22.2% and 15.6% respectively.

In the 2021 census, Fig Tree Pocket had a population of 4,345 people.

== Education ==
Fig Tree Pocket State School is a government primary (Preparatory to Year 6) school for boys and girls at Cubberla Street (27.5269°S 152.9656°E). As at the August 2023 census the school had an enrolment of 506 students, with 39 teachers (31.5 full-time equivalent) and 24 non-teaching staff (13.2 full-time equivalent).

Mancel College (formerly The Glenleighden School) is a private primary and secondary (Preparatory to Year 12) school for boys and girls at 33 Cubberla Street (27.5274°S 152.9634°E). It is operated by Language Disorder Australia and provides multi-disciplinary support for students with developmental language disorders. In 2022, the school had an enrolment of 126 students with 23 teachers (18 full-time equivalent) and 40 non-teaching staff (30.4 full-time equivalent).

Brisbane Montessori School is a private primary and secondary (Preparatory to Year 10) school for boys and girls at Mactier Street (27.5324°S 152.9612°E). In 2022, the school had an enrolment of 199 students with 23 teachers (16.6 full-time equivalent) and 38 non-teaching staff (13.6 full-time equivalent).

Fig Tree Pocket is also serviced by two privately run early childhood centres, the Gan Gani kindergarten as well as the Fig Tree Pocket Early Childhood Centre.

There are no government secondary schools in Fig Tree Pocket. The nearest are Kenmore State High School in neighbouring Kenmore to the north-west and Indooroopilly State High School in neighbouring Indooroopilly to the north-east.

There are primary and secondary private schools within the neighbouring suburb of Indooroopilly – the Ambrose Treacy College, Brigidine College and St Peters Lutheran College.

== Amenities ==
Fig Tree Pocket has a 40-acre (16 ha) equestrian club at Fig Tree Pocket Road (27.5350°S 152.9651°E). It has a sand arena, cross-country course and polo field.

Fig Tree Pocket Riverside Reserve at 870 Fig Tree Pocket Road (27.5422°S 152.9719°E) has a public boat ramp into the Brisbane River (27.5420°S 152.9736°E).

== Attractions ==
Lone Pine Koala Sanctuary is at 708 Jesmond Road (27.5325°S 152.9678°E). It is the largest and oldest koala sanctuary in the world and operates as a tourist and education centre.
