= Oxley War Memorial =

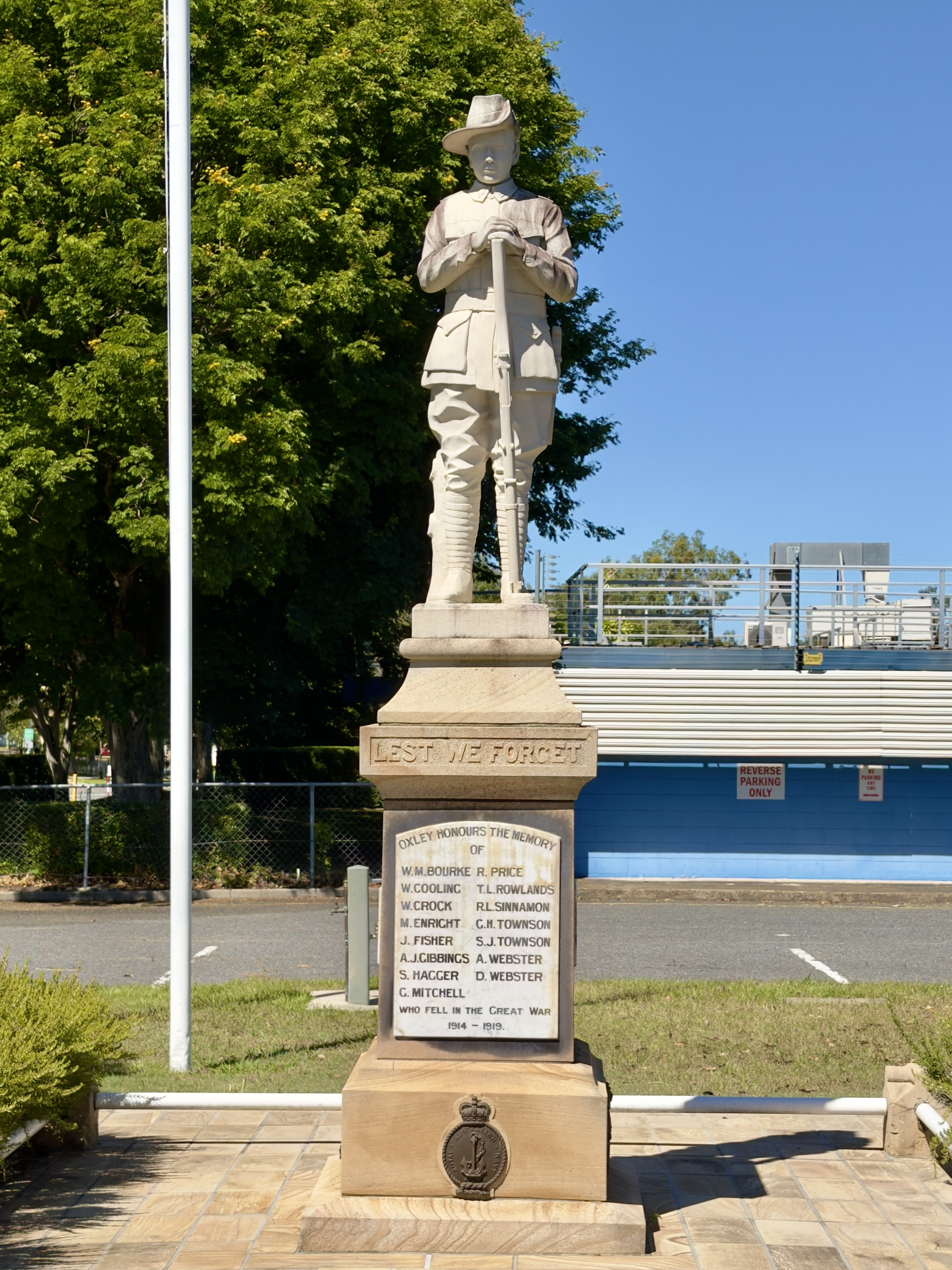
- The memorial is partially surrounded by rosemary

- Location within Queensland Location within Australia
- 27.5648°S 152.9798°E
- Location: 1218 Oxley Road, Oxley, Queensland, Australia

History
- Design period: 1919–1930s (interwar period)
- Built: 1920

Queensland Heritage Register
- Official name: Oxley War Memorial, Oxley Memorial Park, Oxley Place
- Type: state heritage (landscape, built)
- Designated: 4 July 2006
- Reference no.: 602447
- Significant period: 1920s (historical) ongoing (social)
- Significant components: views to, garden/grounds, memorial – soldier statue, memorial – plaque, trees/plantings, fencing

Oxley War Memorial is a heritage-listed memorial at 1218 Oxley Road, Oxley, Queensland, Australia. It was built in 1920. It is also known as Oxley Memorial Park and Oxley Place. It was added to the Queensland Heritage Register on 4 July 2006.

== History ==
Today, the Oxley War Memorial sits on the crest of a ridge on the corner of Oxley Road and Bannerman Street in Oxley, where it is an important visual component of the streetscape setting on a busy arterial road.

The War Memorial was originally erected by local residents on a small parcel of reserved land on the corner of Oxley Road & Ipswich Road. It was unveiled on Saturday 12 February 1921 by the wife of Cecil Elphinstone, Member of the Legislative Assembly for Oxley. In 1929 Brisbane City Council acquired the land on which the monument stood from the previous proprietors who were the registered trustees of the reserve. The memorial was moved to its present location in the 1980s due to traffic requirements.

The memorial was funded by public subscriptions at an establishment cost of about £110. The mason was F Williams & Co of Ipswich, who was also responsible for the memorials at:

- Toogoolawah, One Mile, West Ipswich & Western Suburbs Ipswich (1917)
- Colinton & Mount Alford (1918)
- Booval & Bundamba (1919)
- Boonah, Maroon & Oxley (1920)
- Esk & Toombul Shire at Nundah (1921)
- the Weeping Mother Memorial at Gatton (c.1922)
- Warwick (1923–24)
- Ipswich Cemetery Cenotaph (1932).

== Significance of war memorials in Queensland ==
Australia, and Queensland in particular, had few civic monuments before the First World War. The memorials erected in the wake of the war became our first national monuments. Australia lost 60,000 from a population of about four million, representing one in five of those who served. The casualty rate of the Australian volunteer military forces was significantly and proportionally higher than any of the other combatant groups, claiming 20% of the Australian volunteers who served, and 1.5% of the total Australian population. Australia's maturity as a nation and continuing commitment to the "motherland" were proven beyond doubt. No previous or subsequent war has made such a devastating impact on the nation.

Even before the end of the war, memorials became a spontaneous and highly visible expression of national grief. To those who erected them, they were as sacred as grave sites, substitute graves for the Australians whose bodies lay in battlefield cemeteries in Europe and the Middle East. British policy decreed that the Empire war dead were to be buried where they fell. The word "cenotaph", commonly applied to war memorials at the time, literally means "empty tomb".

Australian war memorials are distinctive in that they often commemorate those who served, not only the dead. Australians were proud that their first great national army, unlike other belligerent armies, was composed entirely of volunteers, men worthy of honour whether or not they made the supreme sacrifice. Many memorials honour all who served from a locality, not just the dead, providing valuable evidence of community involvement in the war. Such evidence is not readily obtainable from military records, or from state or national listings, where names are categorised alphabetically or by military unit.

Australian war memorials are also valuable evidence of imperial and national loyalties, at the time not seen as conflicting; the skills of local stonemasons, metalworkers and architects; and of popular taste. In Queensland, the soldier statue was the popular choice of memorial, whereas the obelisk was favoured in the southern states, where overall responsibility for the approval of war memorials fell under the jurisdiction of a Board made up of artists and architects.

Although there are many different types of memorials in Queensland, the digger statue is the most common. It was the most popular choice of communities responsible for erecting the memorials, seen as embodying the ANZAC spirit and representing the qualities of the ideal Australian: loyalty, courage, youth, innocence and masculinity.

The digger and the little digger statues are an iconic Queensland memorial form. Oxley Memorial Park is an exemplar of this class of cultural places.

War memorials serve as focal points for the local community during the annual ceremonies of 25 April, Anzac Day, the Australian national day of commemoration and remembrance for all those who have fallen in war. The Anzac Day dawn ceremony, the one minute of silence, the Ode, and the bugle call of the Last Post are features of these commemorations for Australians. The Oxley War Memorial serves this function for both the local and the wider Australian community.

== Description ==
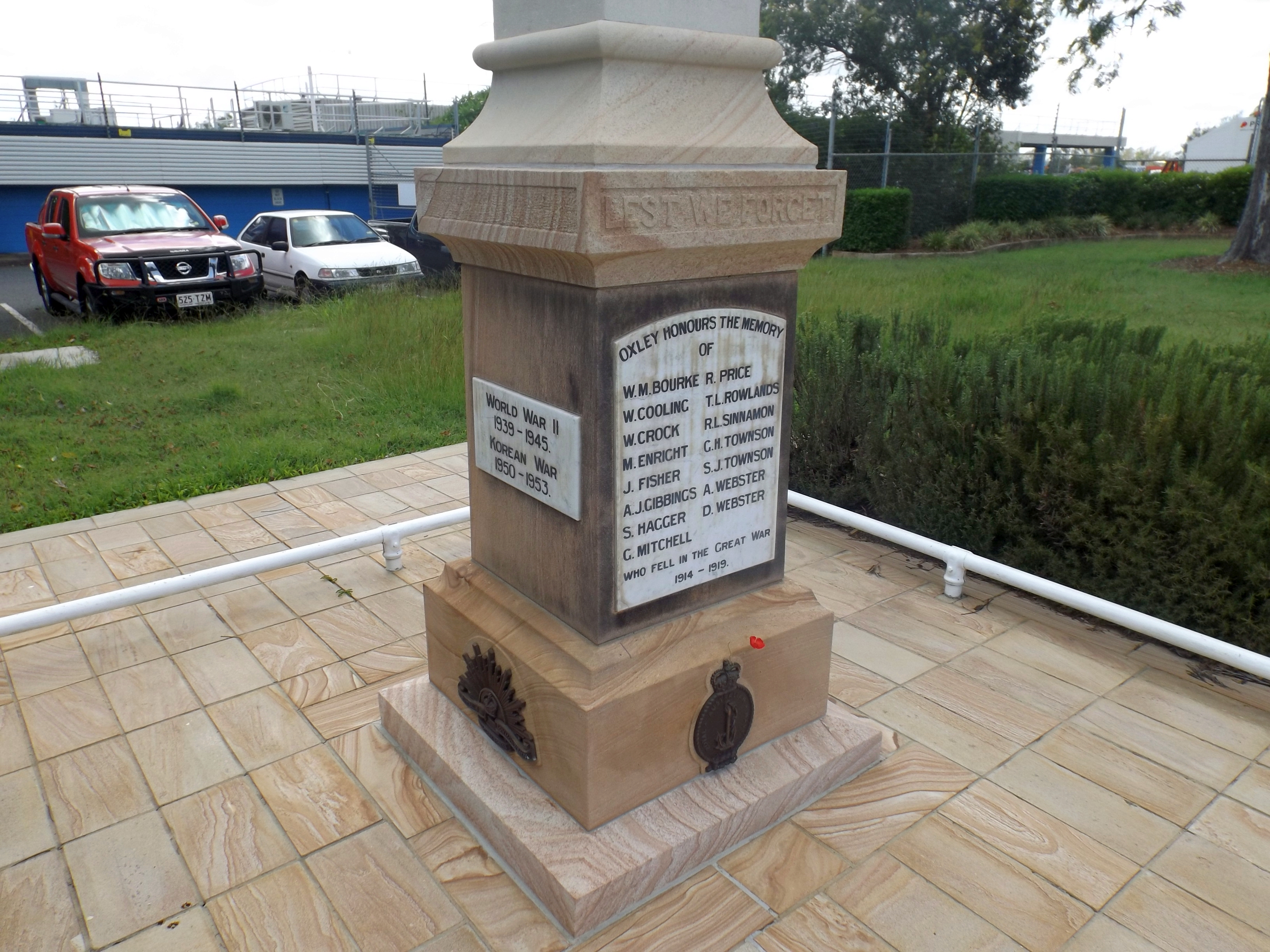
Close-up, 2014

The Oxley War Memorial stands to the northwest of a small rectangular park on the corner of Oxley Road and Bannerman Street. The park setting contains grassed areas, decorative planted beds and hedges, scattered trees, children's play equipment and the war memorial monument.

The sandstone and marble monument stands on a low dressed stone plinth surrounded by stone pavers. A stepped sandstone pedestal bears a sandstone soldier figure facing west. Identifiably Australian with a slouch hat and "rising sun" hat badge, the little digger stands at ease with hands resting on his rifle in the reversed arms position.

Carved squat bollards stand to each corner of the stone paver surround and are linked by hollow metal tube rails to the north, east and south. A rectangular decorative garden is planted to the north and south of the paver surround. Three flagpoles stand to the east of the monument.

Surmounting the plinth is the little digger statue. The soldier stands at ease with his head slightly bowed and his rifle reversed resting on his left boot. The hands are crossed and resting on the rifle butt. He is supported by a tree trunk located behind and to his right side.

The west face of the dado bears a marble plaque commemorating those associated with of the district who fell in the First World War. It reads:

OXLEY HONOURS THE MEMORY OF W. M. BOURKE R. PRICE W. COOLING T. L. ROWLANDS W. CROCK R. L. SINNAMON M. ENRIGHT C.H. TOWNSON J. FISHER S.J. TOWNSON A. J. GIBBINGS A. WEBSTER S. HAGGER D. WEBSTER C. MITCHELL WHO FELL IN THE GREAT WAR 1914–1919

Small marble plaques to the north and south faces commemorate involvement in the Second World War (1939–45); the Korean War (1950–53); the Malayan Emergency (1950–60); Borneo; & the Vietnam War (1962–72). Bronze military badges of the Australian Armed Services are fixed to the base of the pedestal.

== Heritage listing ==
Oxley War Memorial was listed on the Queensland Heritage Register on 4 July 2006 having satisfied the following criteria.

The place is important in demonstrating the evolution or pattern of Queensland's history.

The Oxley War Memorial is an important in demonstrating the pattern of Queensland's history representing a recurrent theme that involved most communities throughout the State. It provides evidence from an era of widespread Australian patriotism and nationalism, particularly during and following the First World War. The monument provides a unique documentary record of the fallen, and demonstrates popular taste of the inter-war period.

The place is important in demonstrating the principal characteristics of a particular class of cultural places.

Unveiled in 1920, the memorial at Oxley demonstrates the principal characteristics of a commemorative structure erected as an enduring record of a major historical event. This is achieved through the use of appropriate materials and design elements. As a digger statue, it is representative of the most popular form of memorial in Queensland.

The place is important because of its aesthetic significance.

The Oxley War Memorial is a prominent part of the streetscape, within a landscaped park setting on a busy arterial road.

The place has a strong or special association with a particular community or cultural group for social, cultural or spiritual reasons.

The Oxley War Memorial has a strong and continuing association with the community as evidence of the district's involvement in the First World War. The more recent additions to the memorial for the remembrance of other major offensives during the 20th century, informs us of the historical continuity of the place, and its social & cultural relevance to the community. The Oxley War Memorial is also the focal point for the district's annual Anzac Day memorial services.

The place has a special association with the life or work of a particular person, group or organisation of importance in Queensland's history.

The sandstone sculpture of the little digger atop the marble monument seated on a sandstone pedestal is a fine example of the work of the Queensland mason and sculptor Frederick Williams of F Williams & Co, Ipswich. Williams was responsible for a large number of First World War cenotaphs throughout the Brisbane River Valley and the Ipswich area of south-eastern Queensland. It is believed that Williams used his young 14-year-old son as the model and inspiration for this work, as well as for his other little digger statues.
