= Seventeen Mile Rocks =

- Suburb
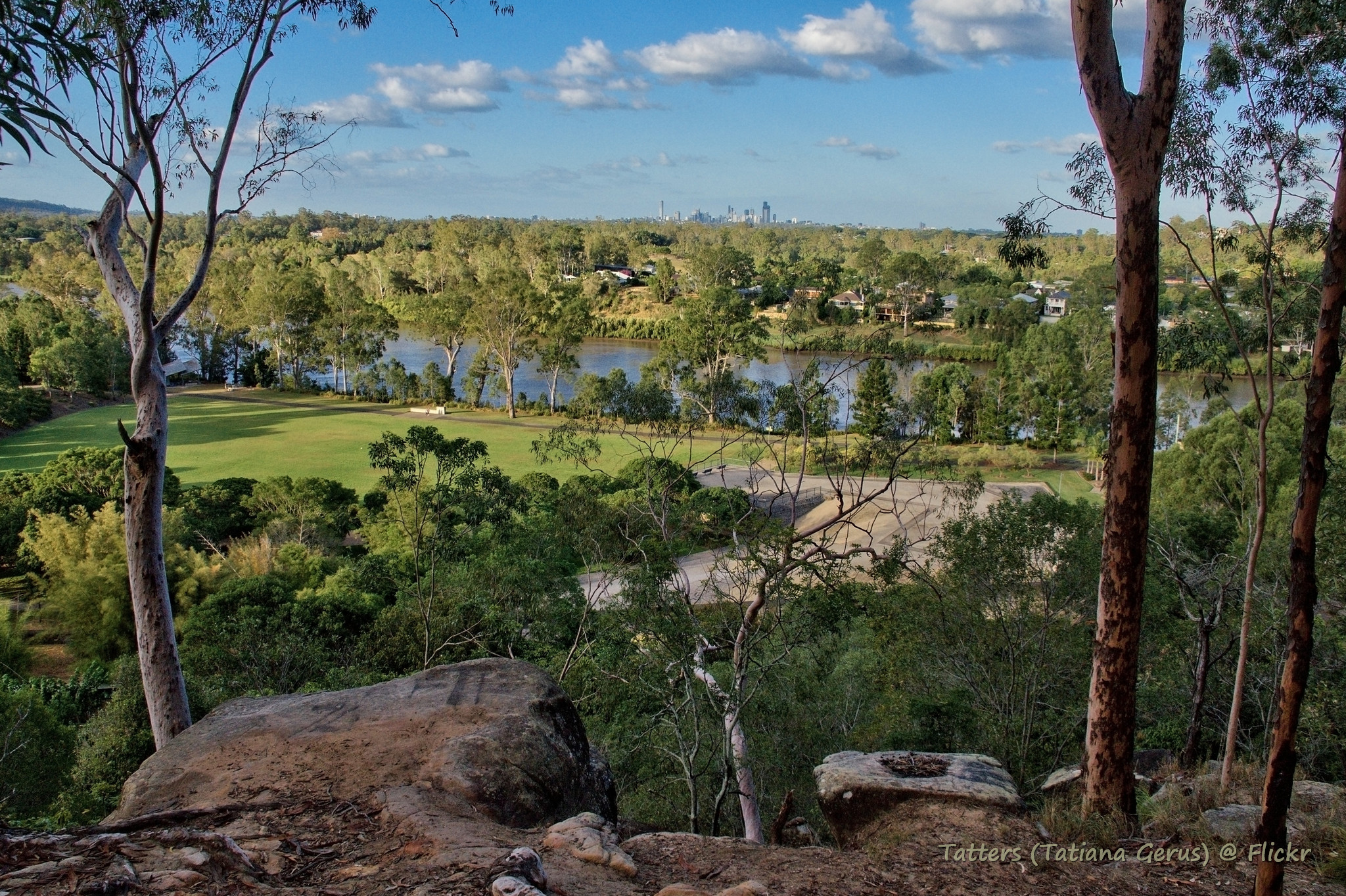
- View across Rocks Riverside Park to the Brisbane River and beyond, 2019

- Interactive map of Seventeen Mile Rocks
- Coordinates: 27.5474°S 152.9547°E
- Country: Australia
- State: Queensland
- City: Brisbane
- LGA: City of Brisbane (Jamboree Ward)
- Location: 16.2 km (10.1 mi) SW of Brisbane CBD

Government
  - State electorate: Mount Ommaney
  - Federal division: Oxley

Area
  - Total: 2.2 km^{2} (0.85 sq mi)

Population
  - Total: 2,699 (2021 census)
  - Density: 1,227/km^{2} (3,180/sq mi)
- Time zone: UTC+10:00 (AEST)
- Postcode: 4073
Suburbs around Seventeen Mile Rocks
Sinnamon Park	Sinnamon Park	Fig Tree Pocket
Sinnamon Park	Seventeen Mile Rocks	Oxley
Darra	Oxley	Oxley

Seventeen Mile Rocks is a suburb in the City of Brisbane, Queensland, Australia. In the 2021 census, Seventeen Mile Rocks had a population of 2,699 people.

== Geography ==
Seventeen Mile Rocks is located 11 kilometres (7 mi) south-west of the Brisbane CBD on the Brisbane River.

It is bounded to the north-east by the median of the Brisbane River and partly bounded to the west by the riparian zone on the western bank of Jindalee Creek.

The north-west of the suburb is an industrial area (27.5413°S 152.9560°E) while the north-east is the Rocks Riverside Park (27.5419°S 152.9605°E). The remainder of the suburb is residential apart from another industrial area in the south-west of the locality (27.5563°S 152.9493°E).

== History ==
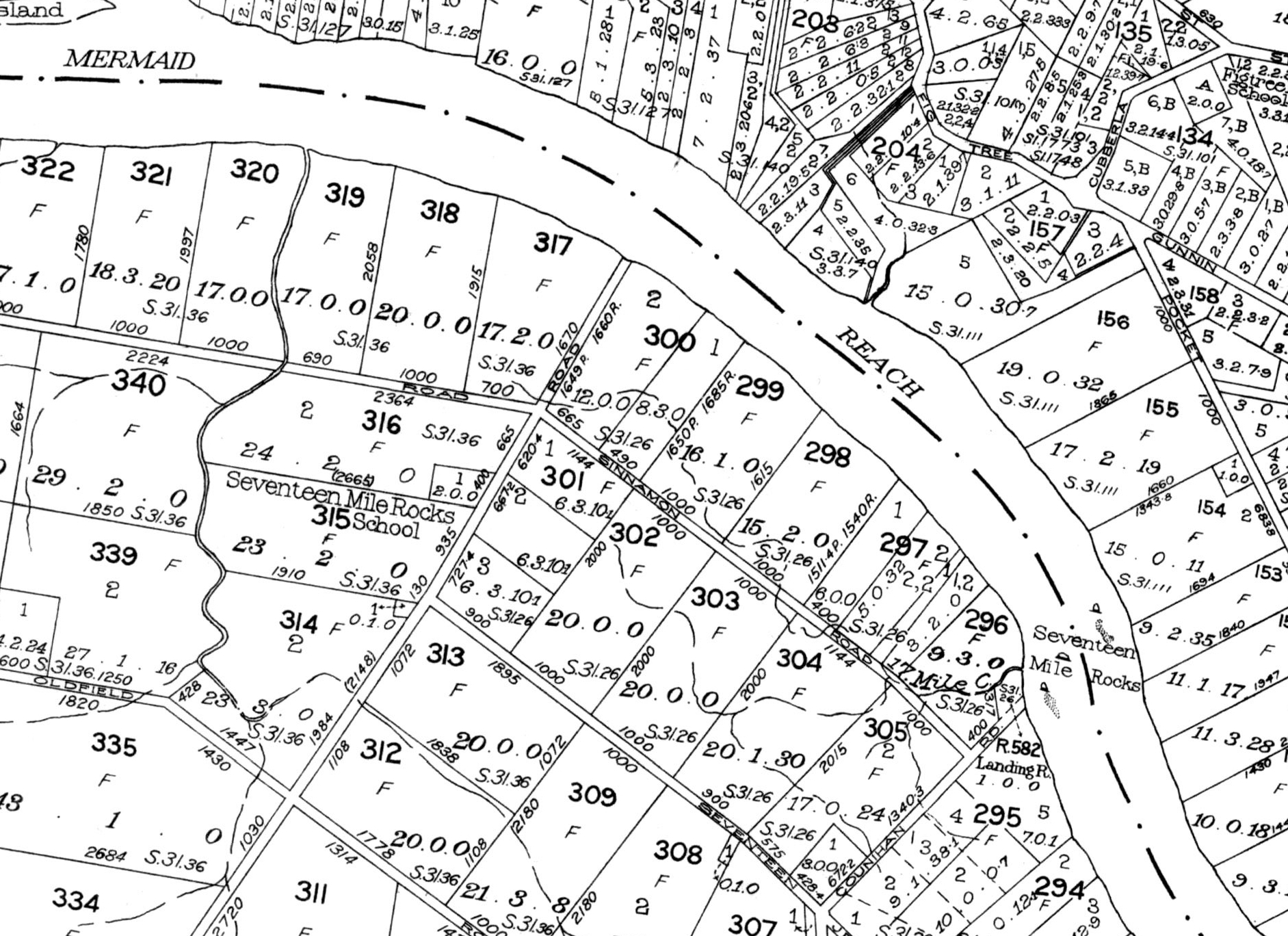
Map of the Brisbane River showing the Seventeen Mile Rocks prior to their removal and the Seventeen Mile Rocks State School, 1962

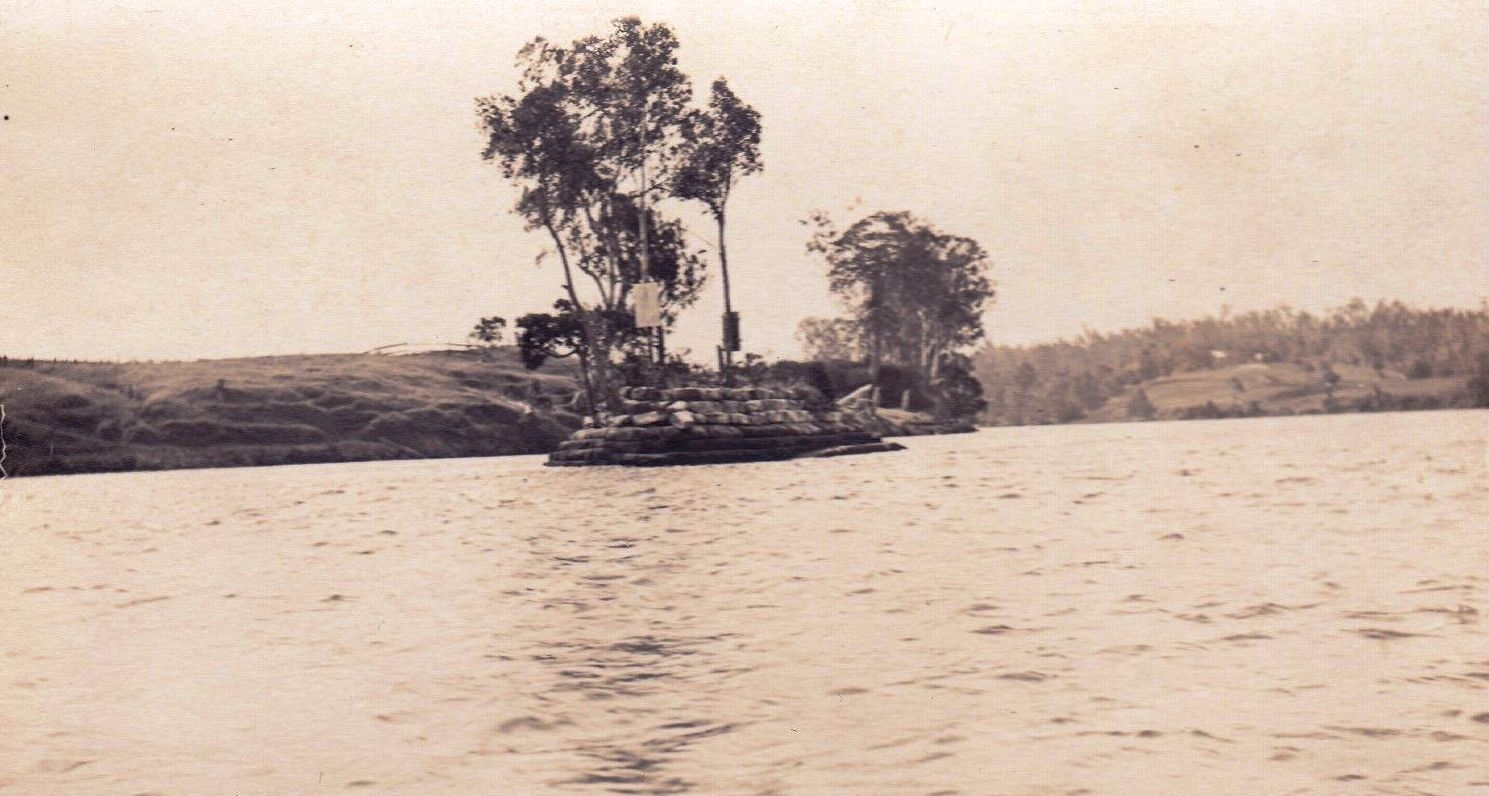
Man-made sandstone cairn at Seventeen Mile Rocks in the Brisbane River, circa 1940s

The suburb Seventeen Mile Rocks is named after a collection of rocks of the same name (27.5375°S 152.9611°E) that marked a distance of 17 miles (27 km) from the mouth of the Brisbane River, as noted by John Oxley on 3 December 1823. They ran diagonally across the river from Counihan Road (see map). These rocks were partially removed in the 1860s to make the river more navigable. However, some of the rocks survived and were marked with beacons to warn shipping. Between 1960 and 1966 all of the remaining rocks were removed to widen the river and allow access for marine vessels to further reaches of the river.

A Bible Christian Chapel (a denomination of Methodism) was opened in Seventeen Mile Rocks in July 1869.

Seventeen Mile Rocks State School opened circa 1874. It closed in 1966. It was Goggs Road opposite the junction with Seventeen Miles Rocks Road (27.5352°S 152.9484°E) which is now within the suburb of Jindalee. Jindalee Home shopping centre is now on that site.

A portion of Seventeen Mile Rocks comes from the Wolston Estate, consisting of 54 farms on an area of 3000 acres, offered for auction at Centennial Hall, Brisbane, on 16 October 1901. Wolston Estate is the property of M. B. Goggs, whose father obtained the land forty years previously in the 1860s and after whom Goggs Road is named. Only three of the farms sold at the original auction.

The suburb was previously an industrial one; but in recent years new housing estates have been developed greatly increasing the residential population. The major estate is Edenbrooke, while the newest is Verandah. The major road through the suburb is Seventeen Mile Rocks Road which links the suburb to Jindalee and the Western Freeway at the western end and Oxley at the eastern end.

The Western drive-in movie theatre was on the south-eastern corner of Seventeen Mile Rocks Road and Fremont Street (27.5473°S 152.9589°E). It extended almost through to Argyle and Molesworth Streets (apart from a row of houses facing each of those streets). It operated from 10 November 1966 until 22 June 1988. It initially opened with a capacity of 500 cars but expanded that to 642 by 1971. It was replaced in the late 1980s by a housing estate.

Several of the new estates also feature walking tracks and lakes.

== Demographics ==
In the 2006 census, Seventeen Miles Rocks had a population of 2,899 people.

In the 2016 census, Seventeen Mile Rocks had a population of 2,720 people.

In the 2021 census, Seventeen Mile Rocks had a population of 2,699 people.

== Education ==
There are no schools in Seventeen Miles Rocks. The nearest government primary schools are Darra State School in neighbouring Darra to the south, Corinda State School in Corinda to the east and Jindalee State School in Jindalee to the north-west. The nearest government secondary schools are Corinda State High School in Corinda and Centenary State High School in Jindalee.

== Facilities ==
Rocks Riverside Park is located in Seventeen Mile Rocks. It is one of Brisbane's largest riverside parks. It features walking and cycling tracks, a basketball court, a flying fox, a climbing web as well as picnic facilities and playing fields.

Seventeen Mile Rocks includes three Christian churches:

- iSee Church at 308 Seventeen Mile Rocks Road (27.5508°S 152.9584°E)
- 17 Mile Church
- Riverlife Baptist Church (previously the Kenmore Baptist Church on Kenmore Road, Kenmore).
