= Jindalee State School =

Location
- Brisbane, Queensland; Australia; 27°28′1.38″S 153°1′27.48″E

Information
- Type: Queensland State Schools
- Motto: Onward in Honour
- Established: 1966
- Principal: Vanessa Munker
- Grades: P–6
- Campus: Jindalee
- Colours: Blue and gold
- Website: jindaleess.eq.edu.au

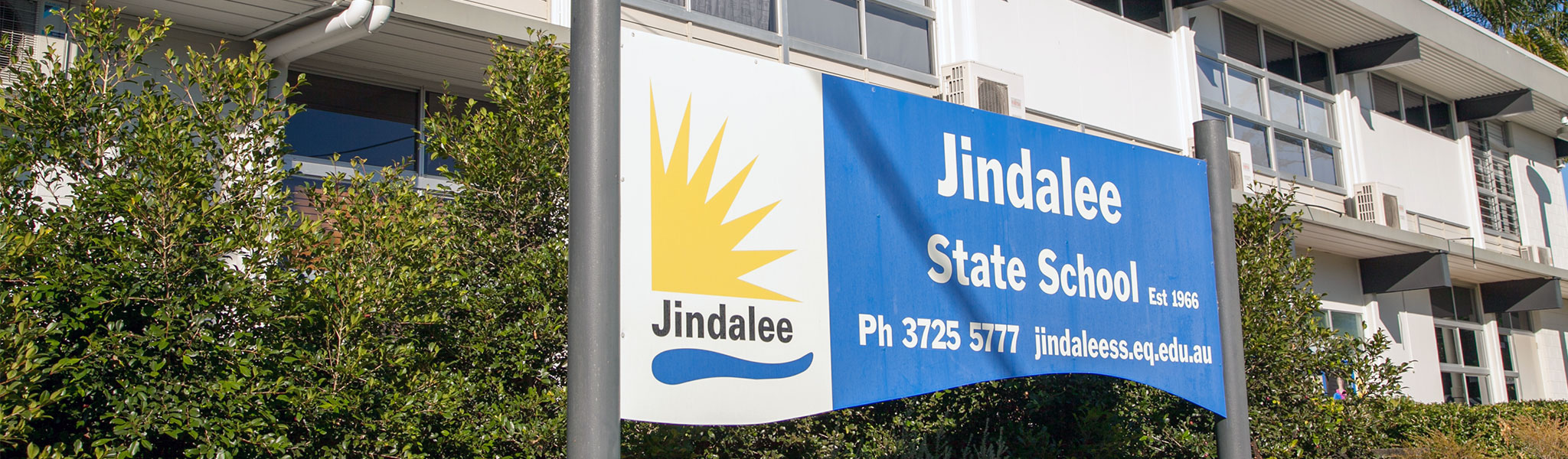

Jindalee State School (JSS) is a public, co-educational, primary school, located in the Brisbane suburb of Jindalee, in Queensland, Australia. It is administered by the Department of Education, with an enrolment of 656 students and a teaching staff of 52, as of 2023. The school serves students from Prep to Year 6.

== History ==
The school opened on 24 January 1966, with an original enrolment of 64. Since then the school has grown larger, with the opening of more blocks over the years, culminating with the opening of the school hall in 1998 and the renovation of a new block in front of the school hall, called H8 and H7 in 2006 and the Kirinari block behind the hall in 2011.

== House system ==
House	Colour
Elliot	Green
Gould	Blue
Cuthbert	Yellow
Hogan	Red

== Laptop Curriculum ==
During 2009, Jindalee was the first school in the Centenary suburbs to have laptop classes, in which students do most of their work digitally on laptops. However, the Laptop program was discontinued in 2015 due to the new "BYOD (Bring Your Own Device)" classes.
