= Susan Schardt =

Australian philanthropist and hospital founder

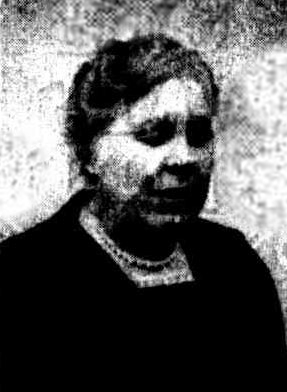
- Born: Susan Katherina Schardt; 15 January 1872; Queanbeyan, New South Wales, Australia
- Died: 9 October 1934 (aged 62); Ryde, New South Wales, Australia
- Occupation: philanthropist
- Years active: 1900–1934
- Known for: founding the Royal Rehabilitation Hospital of Ryde

Susan Schardt (15 January 1872 – 9 October 1934) was an Australian philanthropist who founded an organisation to provide care for poverty-stricken people with incurable conditions who had been discharged from the hospital. Canvassing the state to raise funds, she founded the Commonwealth Home for Destitute Invalids in Ryde, New South Wales to offer services to a larger number of patients.

== Early life ==
Susan Katherina Schardt was born on 15 January 1872 in Queanbeyan, New South Wales to Hannah (née Harris) and Frederick Schardt. Her grandfather, was Count Adam von Schardt and her father, had left Germany during the Australian gold rushes in 1860. By the time of her birth, as the couple's second child, her father was engaged in farming. She and her younger brother, Charles, were born blind, and together they attended the New South Wales Deaf Dumb and Blind Institution in Darlington, New South Wales between 1880 and 1887.

== Career ==
A devout Methodist, during the 1890s and the Long Depression, Schardt visited patients at the Royal Prince Alfred Hospital in Sydney and performed charitable works. She developed a concern for people with incurable diseases or those who could not pay for care and who were discharged with no help for their convalescence. When a destitute man with paralysis was discharged, she arranged housing and care for him and collected donations to provide ongoing care from friends. Eventually, a committee was formed and she began making arrangements for other patients in similar situations.

In 1900, the group rented a house in Redfern which provided care for sixteen patients with their caregivers. They called the facility the Commonwealth Home for Destitute Invalids, which later was known as the New South Wales Home for Incurables. Local notables, like Sir George Reid and Sir Thomas Anderson Stuart, joined the committee board in 1902 and it continued to grow until 1906 when the building was condemned. At that time, they were responsible for having assisted fifty patients.

A public meeting was held and Sir Henry Moses offered Weemala, his estate near Ryde, to the committee at half the auctioneer's value. Generous donations were made from philanthropists and Schardt and her companion Beatrice Ricketts travelled by railway, speaking to interested groups to raise money. Sufficient funds were secured and the new Home for Incurables was opened on 10 April 1907, able to accommodate sixty-five patients. Schardt's speaking engagements were authorised by the Minister of Public Instruction and until 1931, she regularly spoke to schools and at public meetings. She raised over £35,000 for the hospital and a similar facility for cancer patients.

== Death and legacy ==
Schardt died at the institution she had founded in Ryde on 9 October 1934. Her funeral, held at St Philip's Church, was widely attended. After the service, her remains were buried in the family plot in Waverley cemetery. The facility she founded, later known as the Royal Rehabilitation Hospital, is still functioning as an occupational rehabilitation hospital in Ryde.

In November 2023, it was announced that Schardt was one of eight women chosen to be commemorated in the second round of blue plaques sponsored by the Government of New South Wales alongside, among others, Kathleen Butler, godmother of Sydney Harbour Bridge; Emma Jane Callaghan, an Aboriginal midwife and activist; Dorothy Drain, one of Australia's first female war correspondents; writer Charmian Clift; Pearl Mary Gibbs, an Aboriginal rights movement activist, and charity worker Grace Emily Munro.
