= Richard Powell Francis =

Richard Powell Francis (1860–1894) was the first Australian to graduate from Balliol College (Oxford University) and died after rescuing others in the 1893 Brisbane flood.

== Early life ==
Richard (Dick) Powell Francis was born in Eccles, Manchester, England in 1860 and emigrated with his parents Arthur Morley Francis and Angela Francis and new born brother Clement, to Moreton Bay Brisbane on the sailing clipper, Saldanha, with a full passenger list of 500 in February 1862. The family bought land at what is now known as Corinda and farmed this land. The family was to experience the Brisbane River flooding in 1863.

When Dick was 14 he shattered his thumb with a gunshot at Redcliffe, when holidaying at his father's property. He made his way over the 34 miles (55 km) to Brisbane with his brother to the home of Dr. Prentice. To avert death and lockjaw the doctor amputated his thumb without anesthetic.

He became a founding pupil of the Brisbane Grammar School when it was opened for the first time in 1869.

== Study at Oxford University ==
Francis was the winner of the first exhibition scholarship to Oxford University in England and was the first Australian to graduate from the University, from which he returned with the degree of M.A.

== Teacher ==
Francis returned to live in Brisbane approximately in 1885, and took up the post of Master of Mathematics at his old school, the Brisbane Grammar School.

On 5 July 1892, he married Mary Waugh the eldest daughter of Dr. John Neill Waugh at Christ Church, Milton in Brisbane. He lived with his wife at Corinda in the home built by his father, traveling daily back and forth to the Brisbane Grammar School.

== 1893 Brisbane flood ==
In February 1893, Brisbane experienced a huge flood which inundated a large portion of the Chelmer, Graceville, Sherwood and Corinda area. When the flood waters rose, he launched his own small boat and began the work of rescue. Many people he reached just in time to save them from being washed from roof tops in to the rising waters. To others, whose danger was not urgent, he carried food. According to accounts published at the time, this young grammar school master could not have done what he did, save for the fact that he was an athlete, a prominent Rugby footballer and cricketer. Rain fell incessantly and his clothes were never dry. Yet for three days and nights without ceasing, he rescued marooned people with his row boat over the flood waters without stopping to sleep or even to rest, snatching a bite of food as opportunity offered.

== Death and funeral ==
His heroism led to his death. In his weakened condition a chill which he caught rapidly developed into pneumonia. He died on 24 February 1893, at his residence aged 32 years and 10 months.

The boys of the Brisbane Grammar School were shocked to hear of his death. His funeral to the cemetery at Corinda was one of the largest that had been attended in Brisbane. Men who had been with Dick Francis as first students when the Brisbane Grammar was opened in 1869 joined with his own class pupils and the remainder of the then school to follow his remains to their last resting place at the Francis family cemetery. Among those he rescued were some of his pupils from the Grammar School, where his popularity, already established, was enhanced and he became the hero of the college.

His wife Mary gave birth to their only son, Richard Powell Waugh Francis on 16 April 1893 a couple of months after his death. His son became a doctor and went to serve in the rank of captain as a medical officer in World War I embarking on 7 September 1916. He went to live in Sydney and died in 1944.

== Commemoration ==
There is a bronze memorial tablet in the Great Hall of the school, erected in 1942 in memory of him.

A plaque on the north wall of the antechapel at Balliol College commemorates him with the following words: ‘'The first Australian student at Balliol, who by his unselfishness and public spirit in the College, by his work at the earliest settlement in East London, and afterwards as a Master at Brisbane Grammar School, was an influence for good on many. He was born in 1860, matriculated 1879, and died in 1893, giving his life to help others in the Great Flood at Brisbane."
