= Cyclone Wanda =

Australian region cyclone in 1974

Coordinates: 27°27′54″S 153°02′06″E

Tropical Cyclone Wanda
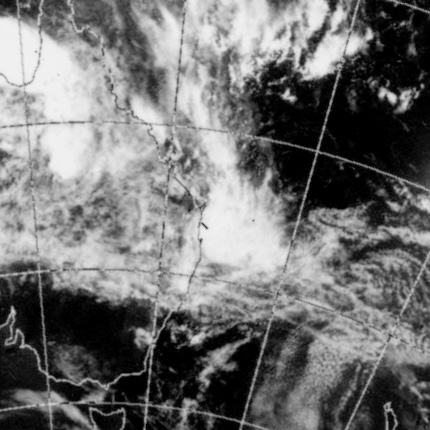
- Tropical Cyclone Wanda shortly before landfall on January 24

Meteorological history
- Formed: 20 January 1974
- Dissipated: 26 January 1974

Category 2 tropical cyclone
- 10-minute sustained (BOM)
- Highest winds: 95 km/h (60 mph)
- Lowest pressure: 997 hPa (mbar); 29.44 inHg

Tropical storm
- 1-minute sustained (SSHWS/JTWC)
- Highest winds: 65 km/h (40 mph)

Overall effects
- Fatalities: 16
- Damage: A$980 million
- Areas affected: Queensland
- Part of the 1973–74 Australian region cyclone season

Tropical Cyclone Wanda was a weak but very damaging tropical cyclone that caused severe flooding in Queensland after three weeks of continuous rain. The system made landfall as a Category 2 Tropical Cyclone over Fraser Island, before tracking west, and causing enormous levels of rain over Brisbane and surrounding areas. The Brisbane River, which runs through the heart of the city, broke its banks and flooded the surrounding areas. The cyclone also flooded surrounding cities: Ipswich, Beenleigh, and the Gold Coast.

In total, there were 16 fatalities, 300 people injured, 8,000 homes destroyed and an estimated A$980 million in damages. 13,000 properties were impacted.

== Meteorological history ==
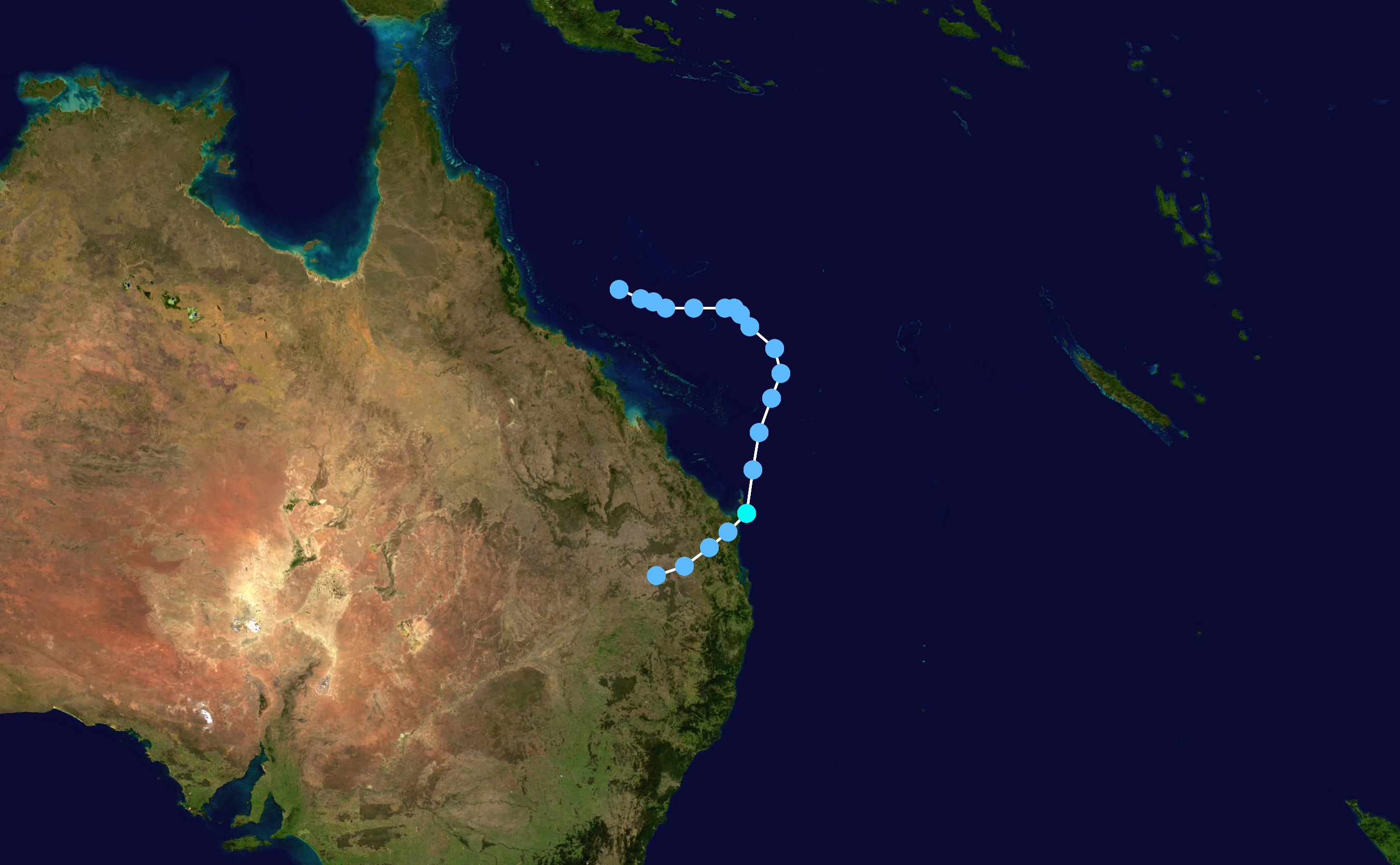
Map plotting the storm's track and intensity, according to the Saffir–Simpson scale Map key Saffir–Simpson scale Tropical depression (≤38 mph, ≤62 km/h) Tropical storm (39–73 mph, 63–118 km/h) Category 1 (74–95 mph, 119–153 km/h) Category 2 (96–110 mph, 154–177 km/h) Category 3 (111–129 mph, 178–208 km/h) Category 4 (130–156 mph, 209–251 km/h) Category 5 (≥157 mph, ≥252 km/h) Unknown Storm type Tropical cyclone Subtropical cyclone Extratropical cyclone, remnant low, tropical disturbance, or monsoon depression

Tropical Cyclone Wanda's origins can be traced back from 20 January 1974 as a low pressure area located to the southwest of Willis Island in the wake of Tropical Cyclone Vera which had moved steadily away from the region during the previous few days. The low gradually developed while moving on an east-southeast track away from the Queensland coast.

On 23 January, it veered onto a south-southwest track while gradually intensifying, and was named Wanda on 24 January. Wanda strengthened to a category 2 before crossing the coast just north of Double Island Point later the same day. Its central pressure at that time was 997 hPa. After crossing the coast, Wanda rapidly weakened to a tropical low, while moved towards the southwest before dissipating on January 25.

== Impact ==
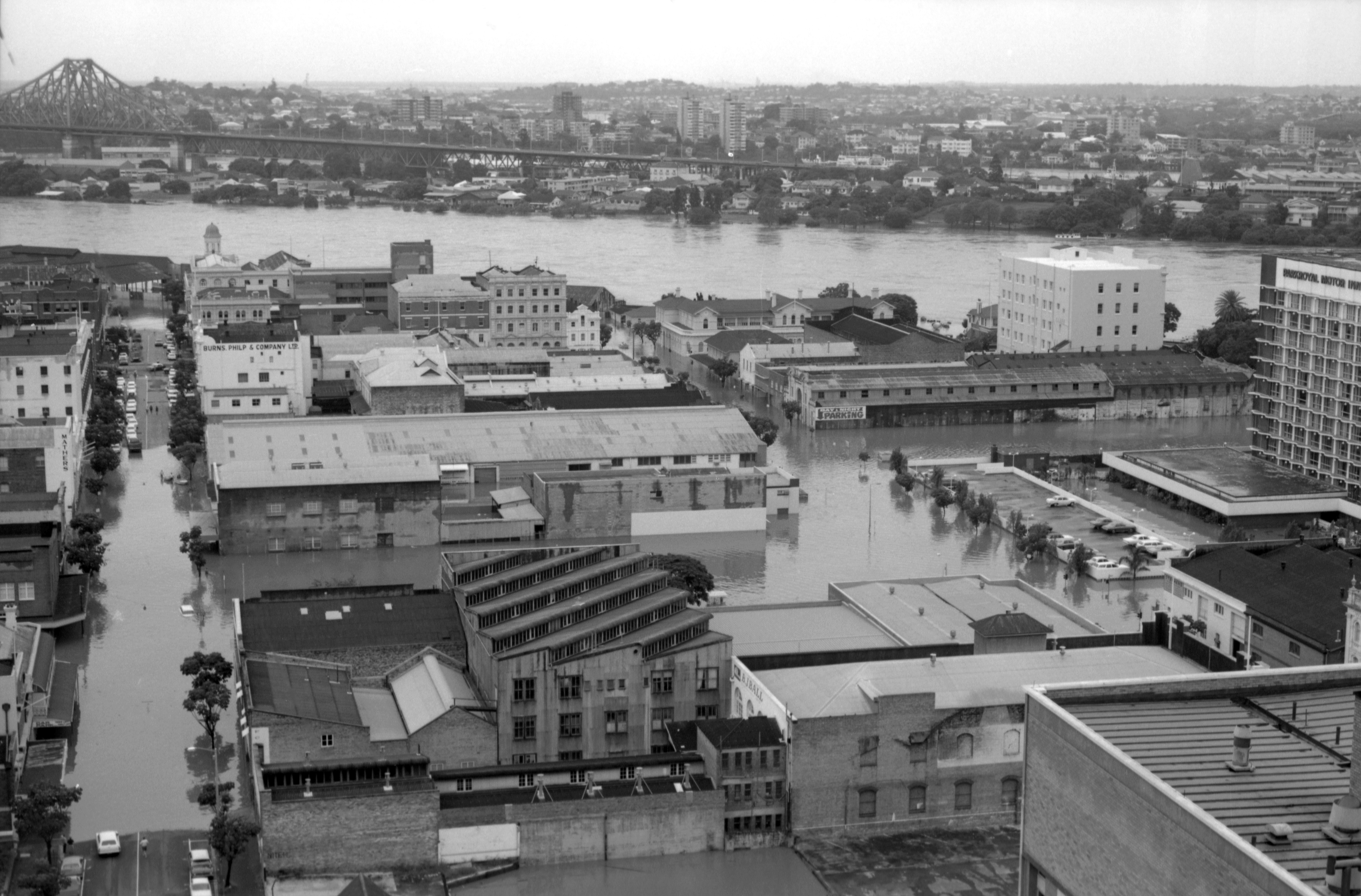
Aerial view looking at the flooding in Mary and Margaret Streets in the Brisbane CBD, January 1974

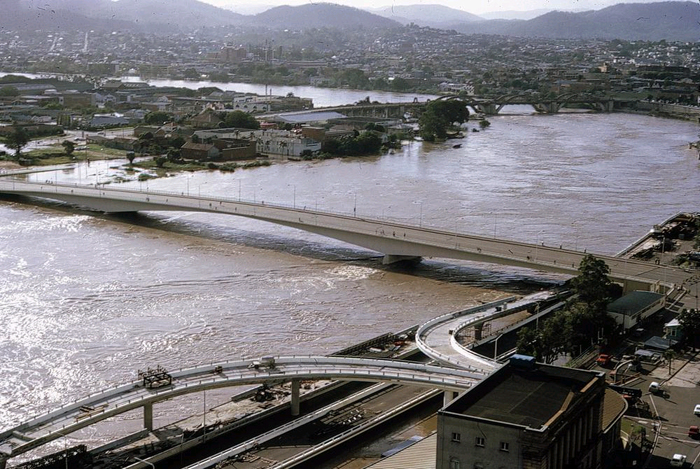
Victoria Bridge during the floods caused by Cyclone Wanda

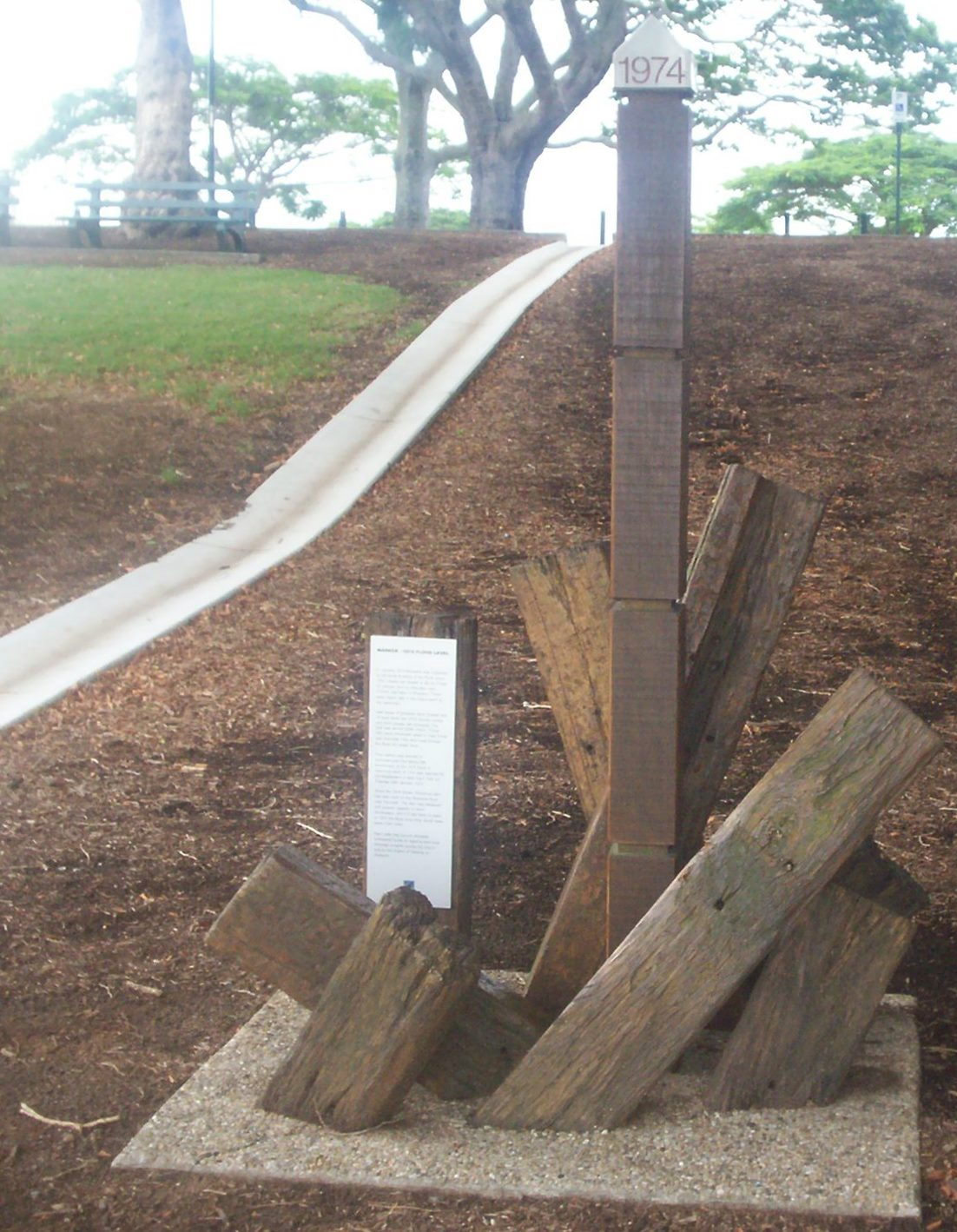
"Watermark" in New Farm Park is a red steel sculpture commemorating the flood.

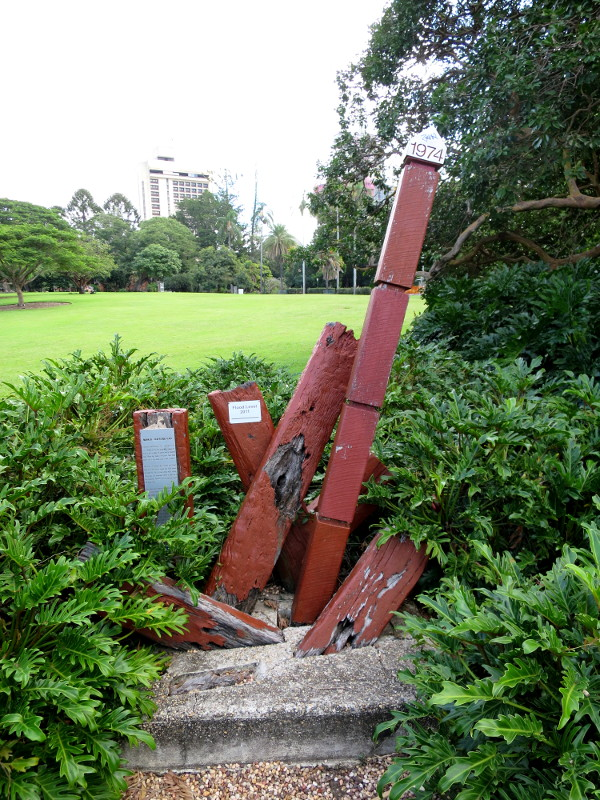
Water level marker commemorating Brisbane floods in Brisbane City Botanical Gardens.

Wettest tropical cyclones and their remnants in Australia Highest-known totals
Precipitation			Storm	Location	Ref.
Rank	mm	in	Storm	Location	Ref.
1	2,252	88.66	Jasper 2023	Bairds	
2	1,947	76.65	Peter 1979	Mount Bellenden Ker	
3	1,870	73.62	Rona 1999	Mount Bellenden Ker	
4	1,318	51.89	Wanda 1974	Mount Glorious	
5	1,256.8	49.48	Fletcher 2014	Kowanyama	
6	1,111	43.74	Alfred 2025	Upper Springbrook	
7	1,082	42.60	Aivu 1989	Dalrymple Heights	
8	1,065	41.93	May 1998	Burketown	
9	1,000	39.37	Justin 1997	Willis Island	
10	1,000	39.37	Ellie 2009		

It had been an exceptionally wet spring, and by the end of October most of southern Queensland's river systems were nearing capacity. Cyclone Wanda pushed the systems to the limit, and drew the monsoonal trough southward, providing the additional rainfall to the Brisbane River, Bremer River and Stanley River catchments to produce widespread and severe flooding. In the early morning of 25 January heavy rain began to fall on Brisbane. During a 36-hour period 642 mm of rain fell on the city.

Large areas were inundated, with at least 6,700 homes flooded. Around 13,000 buildings were affected by flooding in some way. Buildings in the Brisbane central business district were particularly hard hit.

The 67,320 tonne Robert Miller broke its moorings at Kangaroo Point swinging out into the river held by two emergency anchors that the shipyard had placed as a precaution. When the first responders, consisting of the shipyard manager, Bill Dransfield, legendary rigger Fred Cotton and another shipyard employee, Billy Pinell managed to climb on board after hitching a ride on a small boat whose skipper braved the raging torrent, the men found that one anchor had been lost with clench pins sheared through and the remaining anchor only secured by the last clench pin which had failed but jammed the chain. After using steel scaffold tube and other construction materials to secure that anchor the attention then focussed on starting the ship’s main engine which had not yet been fully commissioned. With permission from the engine's maker the engine was able to generate some but not full propulsion and in combination with steering the ship around the worst debris damage was kept to a minimum.

Because the ship was 237 metres long and the river was about 255 metres wide, it was feared that the ship could form a dam across the river. This would have caused the river to rise by a further 3 metres, leading to even greater flooding in the suburbs. Two tugboats which managed to travel up the river arriving some hours after the initial rescue, were needed to control the 15 m high and 239 m long oil tanker. The Robert Miller was the largest ship ever built in Australia at the time.

A gravel barge became caught under the Centenary Bridge where it damaged the pylons, causing fear that the bridge would be swept away. The barge was sunk to reduce the risk.

The most flood-affected suburb of Brisbane was Rocklea. Close to Ipswich, 1,800 premises were affected by flooding. The Nerang River flooded, cutting the Gold Coast off from Brisbane. About 2,000 people were evacuated from homes along the river and the canals; most of these homes suffered flood damage.

In the Brisbane suburb of Corinda, the heavy rains led to a landslide that covered a distance of 1.6 kilometres (0.99 mi), extending into nearby Oxley. The landslide forced ten houses to evacuate, and later led to several houses being demolished. Geoscience Australia indicated that the landslide was due to "increased pore water pressure, unfavourably inclined weak sedimentary rocks […] and lack of adequate surface drainage". Researchers estimated the return period for the event around 100 years".

The total damage in Brisbane and the surrounding areas was initially estimated at A$200 million, but the final value was over A$980 million (1974 values), with $328 million made in insurance claims. While not as high as the floods in the 1800s this flood is considered to have been worse due to Brisbane's rapidly increasing population at the time.

Many houses were also damaged by land subsidence and land slippage associated with the flooding and high rainfall.

=== Deaths ===
Sixteen people lost their lives, including twelve people who were drowned in Brisbane and Ipswich.

The first flood related deaths were at 11:20pm on 24 January. Raymond Roy Davidson (29 years, from Wacol) and Hazel Dulcie Afflick (40 years) were killed in a head-on collision at Wacol, both drivers being blinded by gale-force winds and heavy rain. An army amphibious LARC vehicle was carrying out excavation work at Bellbowrie when the vehicle hit submerged power lines which were still live. Two men, Corporal Neville Hourigan and Captain Ian Kerr of the Australian Army Reserve (then called the Citizens Military Force) were thrown from the vehicle. Bill Lickiss jumped into the water to save them and another CMF soldier, Corporal Ray Ruddy, swam from his undamaged vessel to take control of LARC 05. Hourigan died at the scene and Kerr's body was found after the flood had subsided. Lickiss and Ruddy were both awarded the Queen's Gallantry Medal.

A young child, Shane David Patterson (of Yeronga) was swept from his father's arms on a causeway over Oxley Creek in Inala and drowned.

In addition to those that drowned, Robert Adams (aged 56 years) died of a heart attack during an evacuation of a caravan park at Newmarket. Aidan Sutton, a civilian working with the Queensland Police, aged 50 years, returned home to St Lucia for his reading glasses and was swept away in the flood waters, his body found in a tree.

== Aftermath ==
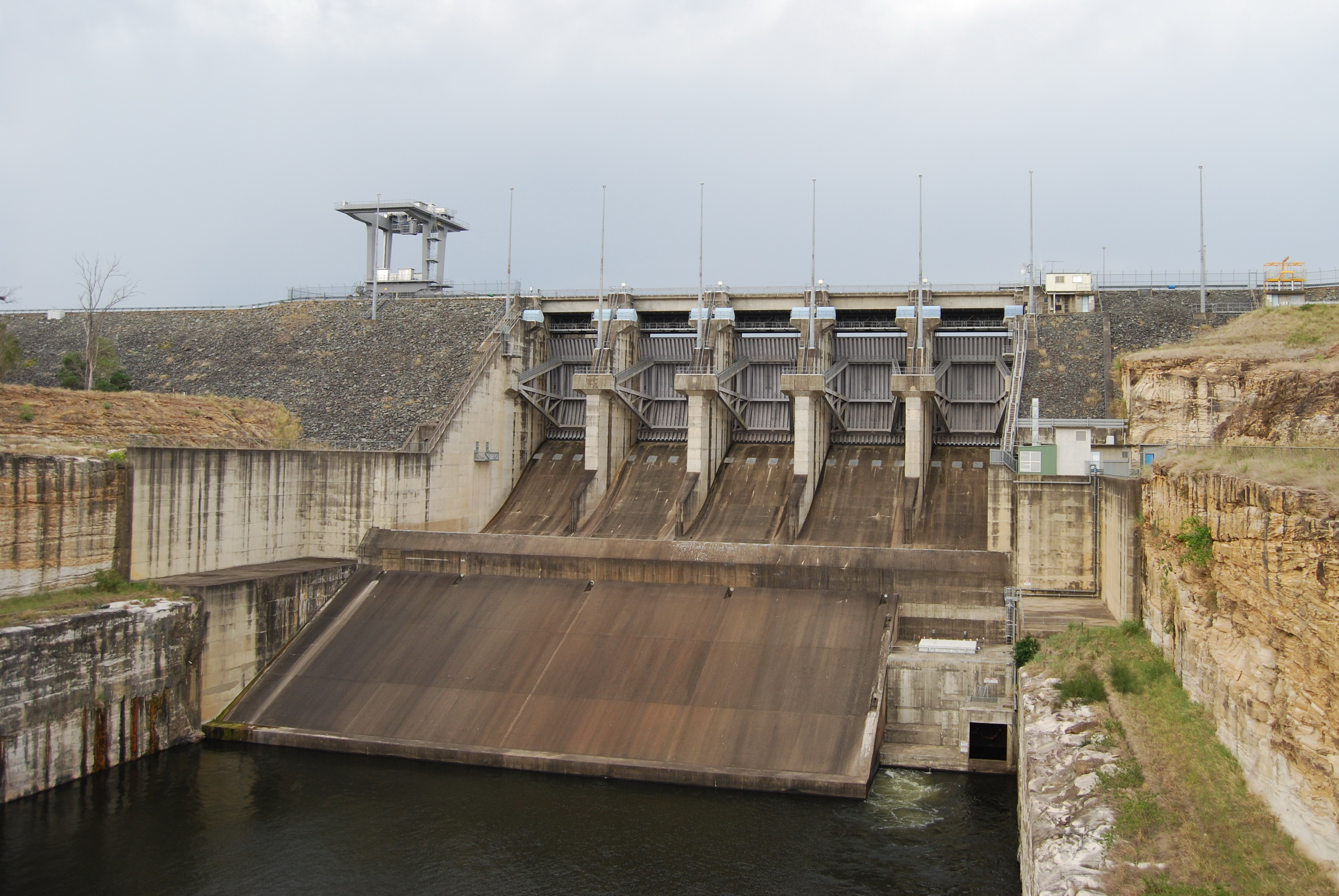
The Wivenhoe Dam was built approximately 80 km upstream from Brisbane after the 1974 floods.

As a result of the flood, planning for the Wivenhoe Dam included flood mitigation as well as its original water supply purpose.

Continual heavy rain associated with a monsoon trough drawn by Wanda had fallen for three weeks, leading up to the flood, which occurred on Sunday, 27 January 1974, during the Australia Day weekend after Wanda had dissipated. The floods peaked at 6.6 m (22 ft) according to the Port Office gauge at high tide at 2:15 am on 29 January. The peak flooding in the location of the city gauge was approximately 5.5 m (18 ft).

The flood was a defining event for a generation of Brisbane residents. In 2009 as part of the Q150 celebrations, the 1974 Brisbane flood was announced as one of the Q150 Icons of Queensland for its role as a "Defining Moment".

The renewed awareness of the flood hazard in this rapidly growing region gave the state an opportunity to significantly re-think flood management and mitigation practices. This opportunity was missed, and the introduction of the Local Government (Planning and Environment) Act 1990 largely upheld conventional planning and development. The dependence on dams was confirmed; a flood plan policy was not introduced until the 21st century. Only 36 years later, the region suffered another disaster of similar magnitude during the 2010–11 Queensland floods.

== See also ==
- List of disasters in Australia by death toll
- Cyclone Alfred (2025) – Another Tropical Cyclone that caused severe flooding within the Brisbane Region
