= Francis Lookout =

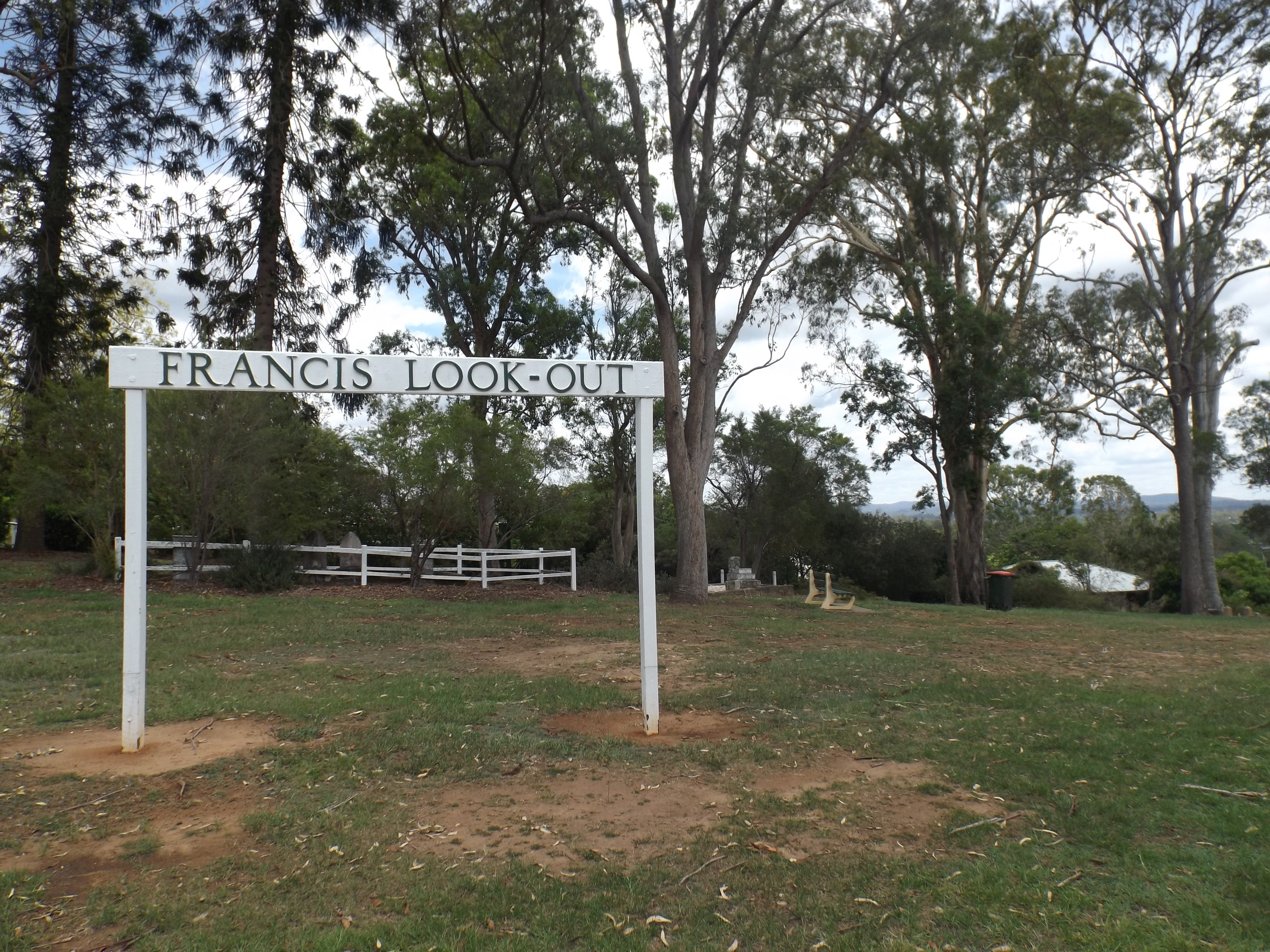
- Signage, 2014

- Location within Queensland Location within Australia
- 27.5368°S 152.9764°E
- Location: 157 Dewar Terrace, Corinda, Queensland, Australia

History
- Design period: 1840s–1860s (mid-19th century)
- Built: 1863–1966

Queensland Heritage Register
- Official name: Francis Lookout, Francis Outlook
- Type: state heritage (landscape, built)
- Designated: 7 September 2004
- Reference no.: 602441
- Significant period: 1860s–1960s (fabric, historical use)
- Significant components: trees/plantings, headstone, fence/wall – perimeter, lychgate, burial/grave, fencing

Francis Lookout is a heritage-listed cemetery at 157 Dewar Terrace, Corinda, Brisbane, Queensland, Australia. It was built from 1863 to 1966. It is also known as Francis Outlook. It was added to the Queensland Heritage Register on 7 September 2004.

== History ==
Francis Lookout is an area of parkland located on a prominent hilltop site in Corinda. It contains burials from between 1862 and 1966. Arthur Morley Francis and his wife Angela were one of the first families to settle in the Corinda area bought 21 acres (8.5 ha), Portion 120, in 1862, which extended from the Brisbane River up to the present location of Francis Lookout. They also bought 33 acres (13 ha) which extended from Oxley Creek to the present Sherwood Road. Their surviving children were Richard Powell Francis Francis, Henry Alexander (Alex) Francis and Charlotte Elizabeth Francis. After the death of Richard in 1893 and Arthur in 1902, Angela, Alex and Charlotte returned to live permanently in West Hoathly, West Sussex, England.

=== Graves ===
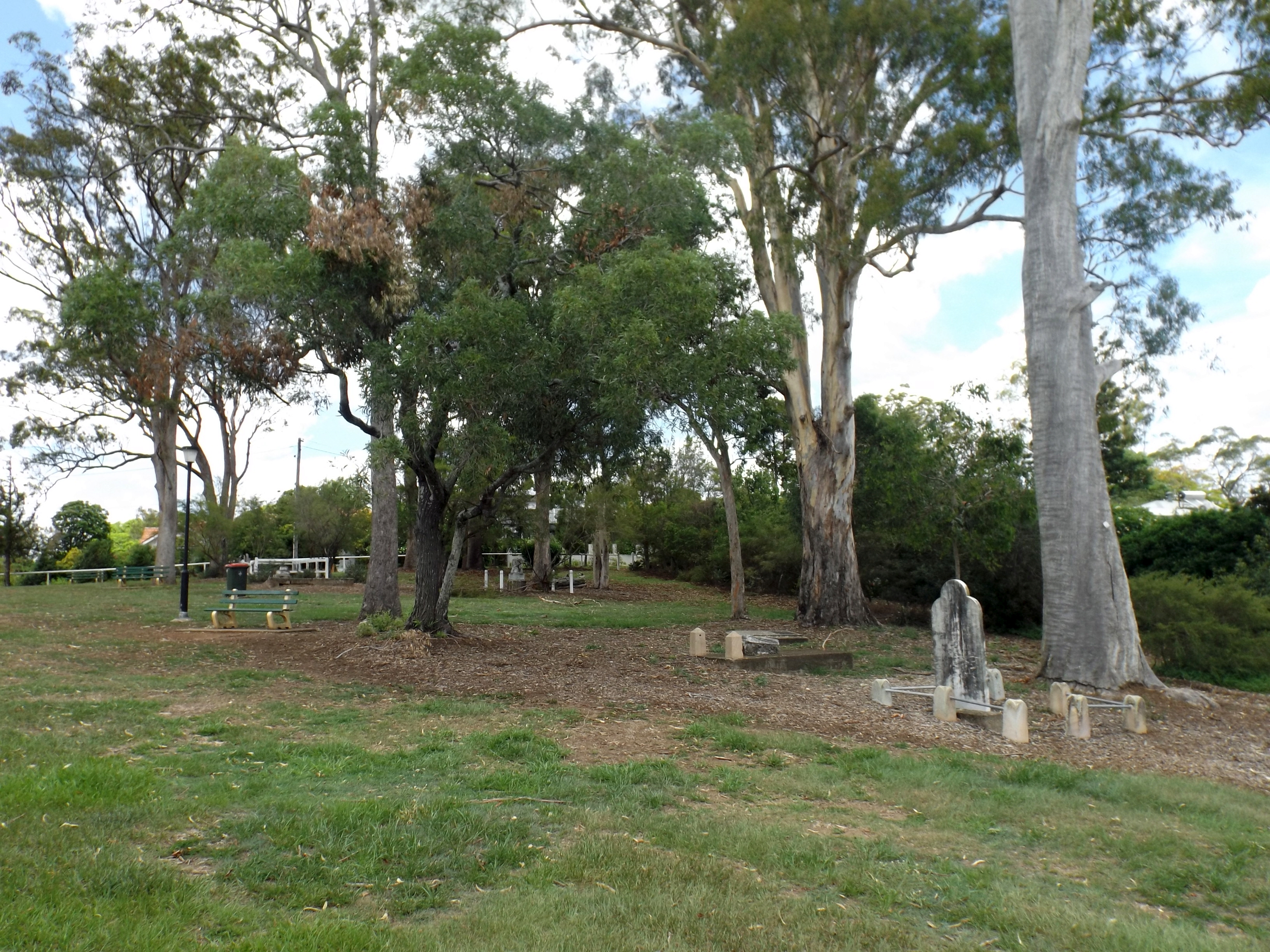
The graves and trees, 2014

Their cemetery was dedicated when their youngest son, Clement, died in 1863. One acre was dedicated for this purpose as there was no municipal cemetery in the district. Arthur Francis was subsequently buried there as well as their son Richard (Dick) Francis, who died a hero after rescuing people in the 1893 Brisbane flood. The last of the family to be buried here was Mary Francis, Dick's wife, in 1937.

Other graves in the cemetery include: the Jones grave, the Dunlop grave, the Clarkson grave, the Walker grave, the Gray grave and two unlocated burials.

=== Lychgate ===
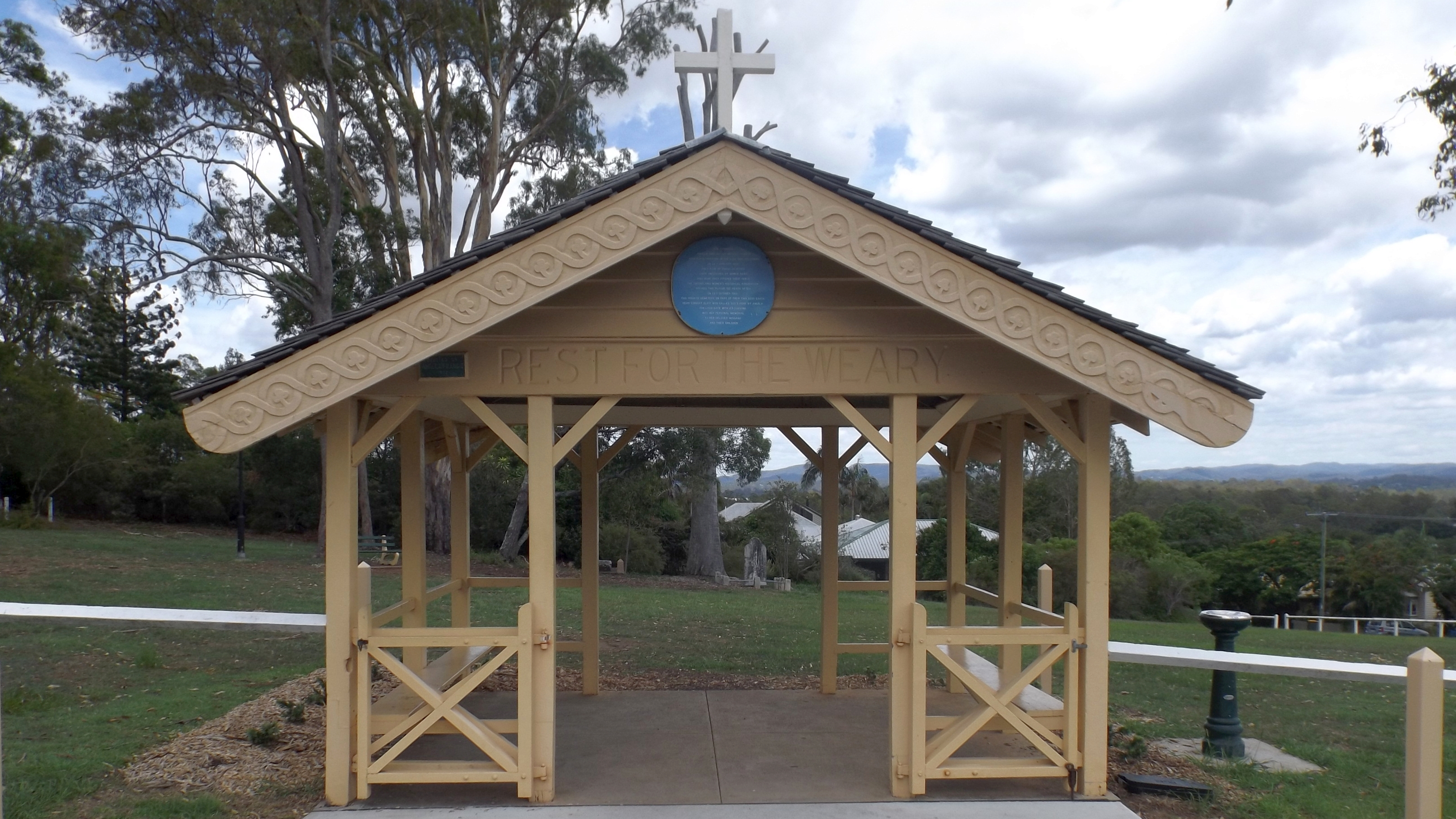
Lychgate, 2014

According to Alex Francis, his mother, Angela Francis, erected the lychgate for her husband Arthur Francis and the elaborate barge boards were carved by her friends. A small bronze plaque reads "ERECTED BY ANGELA FRANCIS 1902".

The lychgate has a gable roof that was originally covered with timber shingles. These were replaced with concrete tiles in 1962, but have again been replaced with timber shingles. East and West gables are infilled with weatherboards. The original timber floor has been replaced with at least two concrete slabs.

=== Transfer to Brisbane City Council ===
In 1930, the Brisbane City Council took direct control of thirteen of Brisbane's cemeteries. At this time Frances Lookout was under the control of living private trustees being Henry Alexander Francis and George Waugh. One of these, George Waugh approached the council with the request the council take over the cemetery, on the condition of the trustees waiving all claims to compensation and that the council would undertake to properly care for the cemetery in perpetuity. Contained in the conditions that the Trustees of the land presented to council was that interment rights after transfer remained for Mrs Mervyn Alban Jones. This option was never taken up my Mrs Jones.

Formal council resumption occurred in 1934. Improvements and repairs to the cemetery occurred in 1935–36 and were as follows:

- the erection of a low fence on the road boundaries
- repair and painting of the picturesque shelter shed
- straightening and adjusting of the existing fence enclosing the graves
- the provision of a suitable name board on the reserve.

== Description ==
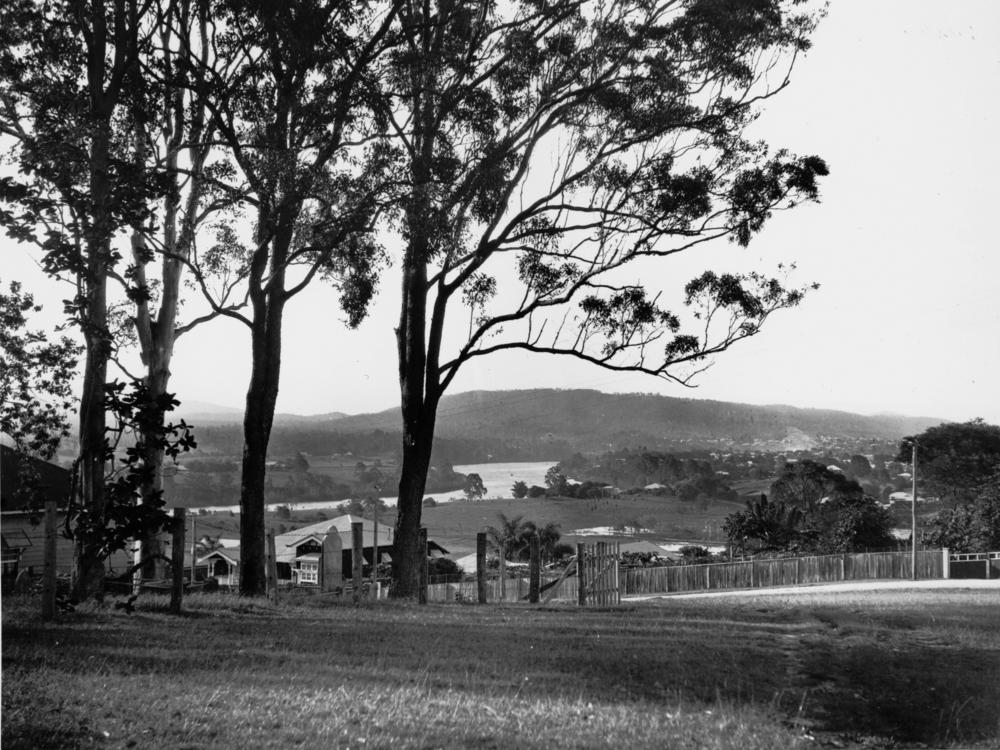
Panoramic view from Francis Lookout, across the Brisbane River towards Mt. Coot-tha, 1931

The parkland is called Francis Lookout and is located on the corner of Dewar Terrace and Hilda Street, Corinda. The park was previously used as a private cemetery and still contains several memorials. A timber lychgate was constructed in 1902.

The park is in a significant hilltop position with panoramic views of Brisbane, especially towards Mount Coot-tha. The site sits at 50 metres (160 ft) high, and is in the mid-range of Brisbane lookout heights.

The Lookout is a local landmark, being prominent in the urban landscape of the Corinda area as well as from the cross-river area of Fig Tree Pocket. The site is generally an open, grassed and reasonably level knoll, gently falling away to the northwest corner.

The boundary fence is white painted 100-by-75-millimetre (3.9 in × 3.0 in) hardwood intermediate posts set in the ground with a 100 by 100 millimetres (3.9 in × 3.9 in) diamond profile top rail and two strands of wire. Entry and corner posts are generally 125 by 125 millimetres (4.9 in × 4.9 in) with a chamfered apex.

The collection of eucalypts is especially significant, as they represent a community type that is found exclusively on rock outcrops at higher altitudes. There is also a significant bunya pine, which appears to have been planted 40–60 years ago.

The site contains 10 known graves and one unlocated grave. The five Francis family graves are situated together and surrounded by a white painted fence. The other graves are located to the northern side of this and scattered in a seemingly random way.

The lychgate is a small timber structure supported on 100-by-100-millimetre (3.9 in × 3.9 in) posts with a gable roof covered by timber shingles. The floor of the structure is concrete.

== Heritage listing ==
Francis Lookout was listed on the Queensland Heritage Register on 7 September 2004 having satisfied the following criteria.

The place is important in demonstrating the evolution or pattern of Queensland's history.

Francis Lookout is important in illustrating the pattern of Queensland's history, being rare surviving evidence of the mid and late 19th century development of the Corinda area as a farming community. In its strong association with the Francis family from 1862 and beyond, the place is also illustrative of the contributions made by individuals to the evolution of Queensland's history.

The place demonstrates rare, uncommon or endangered aspects of Queensland's cultural heritage.

The place is a rare privately established burial ground in the Brisbane area, and has the potential to reveal further information about the settlement of the Corinda district, about 19th and early 20th century burial practices, and about the contingencies of pioneering life.

The place is important in demonstrating the principal characteristics of a particular class of cultural places.

The place illustrates some of the principal characteristics of a small privately established burial ground, including a lack of denominational divisions and the locally connected interments – especially the graves of the family on whose land the ground was established, and of their neighbours. Its layout and funerary furniture are indicative of 19th century cemeteries.

The place is important because of its aesthetic significance.

Francis Outlook is of aesthetic significance due to its hilltop setting, panoramic views of Brisbane, and timber-framed lychgate.

== Gravesites ==
=== Francis Gravesite ===
Burials in the Francis gravesite include:

- Arthur Morley Francis (1826–1902)
- Richard Powell Francis (1860–1893)
- Mary Francis, wife of Richard Powell Francis (died 6 Nov 1937). Mary married Richard on 5 July 1892 at Milton Brisbane. She was the daughter of Dr John Neill Waugh.
- Rebecca Francis (née Agate), wife of Henry Alexander Francis (died 16 Nov 1892). They were married in England in 1889. On their return to Australia in 1890, Rebecca contracted tuberculosis from which she did not recover.
- Arthur Clement, Angela Mary, Robert George 1866, Dorothea 1877, the children of Arthur Morley Francis and his wife. Angela through travels with her husband as Police Magistrate in Queensland, was appalled with the standard of midwifery in country towns as well relating to her own experiences. In 1880 she traveled to England and took up study in midwifery. She returned to Australia and held lectures in country towns to raise funds for suitable women in the town to train in midwifery at Brisbane.

=== Gray Gravesite ===
Burials in the Gray gravesite include:

- Lewis Mackie Gray – 27 May 1895 aged 76 years. She was the wife of William Gray. Born in 1822 in Ayr, Ayrshire, Scotland, parents Marjory Crawford and George Reid, she married William Gray on 2 July 1845 at St. Cuthberts, Edinburgh, Scotland.
- William Gray – 25 Sep 1902 aged 82 years. He was born 3 November 1821 in Edinburgh Scotland, mother, Lewis Mackie and father, William Gray. His family was well off financially and as a young man he studied Law, Medicine and Divinity. On arriving in Brisbane in 1862 on board the Prince Consort, he purchased land in what is now Corinda, and built a house at Consort Cliff on the Brisbane River. William was the only person with any knowledge of medicine in the district and became the unofficial doctor, as well as counselling people on law matters. Most of these services he did for gratis. His ultimate desire was to be a clergyman and after being ordained he became the first officiating clergyman of the newly established St. Matthew's Anglican Church in Sherwood. He was, as a clergyman, called to Townsville and when a fever epidemic broke out he applied his medical skills again.

=== Walker Gravesite ===
Burials in the Walker gravesite include:

- John Higson Walker of Coonarrell, Oxley – 5th Mar 1873 aged 48 yrs. He was formerly Land Surveyor, Preston, Lancashire, England. He was born in 1825, in Preston, Lancashire, England and married Alice Helena Bleadsdale in 1853.
- His wife Alice (Bleasdale) – 19 Apr 1902 aged 72 yrs. Born in 1830, to Henry Bleadsdale and Ann Colthurst.
- Daughter Maria Louisa – (Born 4 August 1865, died 20 March 1866)
- Alice Helena (Amos) – who died at Bingera, 18th Jan 1897 aged 38 years. She married Joseph Pringle Amos on 28 October 1880 at Coonarrell. This inscription is probably a memorial as a gravesite exists for her at South Kolan Cemetery 2645 Bundaberg-Gin Gin Rd South Kolan, Queensland Australia.

The death of their daughter who died in 1866 was probably the reason the family grave was located in the Francis Cemetery. The graveyard in Sherwood only opened in 1871.

=== Clarkson Gravesite ===
Burials in the Clarkson gravesite include:

- Jane Morrow – wife of Joseph Clarkson who died 27th Sept 1896 aged 76 years
- Also their sons Joseph – aged 15 years (died 3 February 1869) Samuel aged 8 years 9 months (died 5 February 1869)
- Also Joseph Clarkson – died 29 May 1902 aged 83 years: Joseph Clarkson was active in the Fig Tree Pocket, being on the school committee and agitating politicians for better facilities in the region.

The Clarkson family were neighbours of the Francis Family and lived across the Brisbane River in what is now known as the Lone Pine Koala Reserve. The death of their sons, only days apart in 1869 was probably the reason the family grave was located in the Francis Cemetery. The graveyard in Sherwood only opened in 1871.

Lone Pine is it was not named after 'Lone Pine' of Gallipoli fame, but after Queensland hoop pine. It was planted in 1868 by Mr. Daniel Clarkson the son of Mr. and Mrs. Joseph Clarkson

=== Dunlop Gravesite ===
Burials in the Dunlop gravesite include:

- John Dudley Dunlop – died 31 Oct 1906 aged 37 years. Born 25 April 1869, the son of John Andrew Dunlop and Mary Ann Dudley and married Sarah Hazelwood on 14 August 1889. The Dunlop family were an early pioneering family of the Corinda district. John was a carpenter by trade. In 1892 he erected a community hall which became known as the Corinda School of Arts, at his own expense and on his own land handing it over to a committee free of rent. The ownership on John's death then passed to his wife, who decided in 1917, to transfer the title to the Sherwood Shire Council at which time it became the Shire Hall. This building still stands and now is the Corinda Library. In May, 1904, he was engaged in the Railway Department and while making repairs at Ipswich, the scaffold gave way, and he fell, receiving serious injuries to his head rendering him unconscious for ten days. This accident caused him to be in a state of depression for periods up to his death. John took his own life by consuming a cocktail of poisons. He was well respected in the community his funeral was well attended.
- Maud Norton – 13 Feb 1966 aged 85 years. She is the sister of John Dudley Dunlop and this is a memorial plaque.
- Ceridwen Mair Williams – 31 Oct 1966. She is the Grand daughter of Maud Norton and Grand Niece of John Dudley Dunlop and this is a memorial plaque.
- Ion Lloyd Williams - 22 March 1952 - 01 May 2013 is the brother of Ceridwen and Grandson of Maud Norton and Grand Nephew of John Dudley Dunlop and this is a memorial plaque.

=== Jones Gravesite ===
Burials in the Jones gravesite include:

- Mervyn Alban Jones – 10 Oct 1902 aged 39 fourth son of Rev. Timothy Jones: and Mary Louisa Bowmar and married to Zoe Annie Clara Pollard 5 August 1891 in Warwick Queensland. At the time of his death he was the Shipping Inspector, Marine Department, Brisbane. Prior to this, he was a shipping pilot between the Torres Straits and Sydney, which was regarded as one of the most dangerous passages for navigation in the world because of the Great Barrier Reef. On one excursion, while guiding five naval ships through this passage bound for Sydney at the start of an evening, he sensed that bearings he had on two headlands were not correct. He ordered the flotilla to anchor for the night, thus disrupting a tight shipping schedule. When daylight came, a reef was seen half a mile ahead, and had they gone on, the whole fleet would have been wrecked. An inquiry was held, and it was found that he had been given the wrong deviation of the ship's compass. The Admiral of the flagship then publicly thanked the Captain Jones for having saved the fleet from destruction.
- Trevor Warwick Jones. Although no headstone is evident in the cemetery, War Memorial websites and newspaper records show that he is buried there. Born 2 July 1895 to Mervyn Alban Jones and Zoe Annie Clara Pollard.At the time of his death at the beginning of World War 1, he was a member of the Expeditionary Force, and was attached to the 1st reinforcements of the 41st Battalion. Prior to his enlistment he had a promising academic career. It was while in camp, prior to leaving for the front, that he contracted the illness which resulted in his death. He is remembered on a memorial plaque at Forgan Smith Building, University of Queensland.
