= Weemalla =

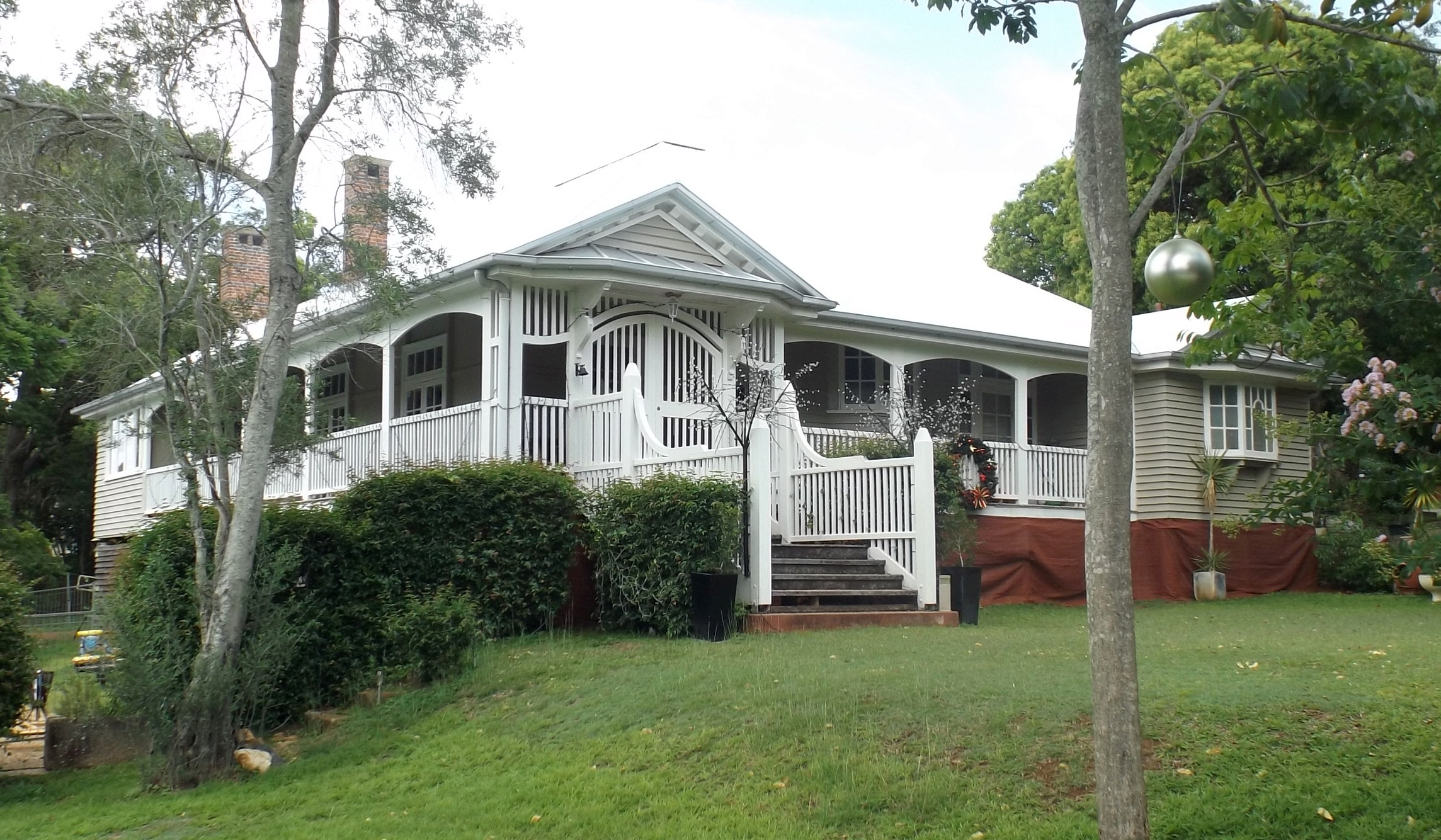
- Residence in 2014

- Location within Queensland Location within Australia
- 27.539°S 152.9767°E
- Location: 62 Ruthven Street, Corinda, City of Brisbane, Queensland, Australia

History
- Design period: 1900–14 (early 20th century)
- Built: 1908–09

Site notes
- Architect: Robin Dods
- Architectural style: Arts & Crafts

Queensland Heritage Register
- Official name: Weemalla, Steele House
- Type: state heritage
- Designated: 9 August 2013
- Reference no.: 602820
- Builders: Hall and Mayer

Weemalla is a heritage-listed detached house at 62 Ruthven Street, Corinda, City of Brisbane, Queensland, Australia. It was designed by Robin Dods and built from 1908 to 1909 by Hall and Mayer. It is also known as Steele House. It was added to the Queensland Heritage Register on 9 August 2013.

== History ==
Weemalla, located at 62 Ruthven Street, Corinda, a south-western suburb of Brisbane, was built in 1908–09. This single-storey timber house was designed by acclaimed architect Robert Smith (Robin) Dods as the suburban home of Robert Moore Steele, Queensland manager of the Victorian Insurance Company Ltd. It is an excellent example of Dods' residential designs for prosperous clients.

Located 11 kilometres (6.8 mi) from the centre of Brisbane, Corinda, initially part of a leasehold from 1851, opened for selection in the 1860s and a number of farms of between 25 and 70 acres were established. The opening of a railway bridge at Indooroopilly in 1876 reduced the area's isolation and encouraged subdivision. During the Brisbane land boom of the 1880s, when Brisbane's population doubled, many allotments were sold and residential building commenced. Corinda in the 1890s was one of Brisbane's sparsely settled new suburbs where the scattered estates of the wealthy, often set on hills, merged with small farms.

Typically, Brisbane's elite resided in spacious properties located on hilltops or beside the river away from the polluted air, noise and commotion of the city, where breezes could counteract the summer heat. Members of Brisbane's elite "society" at the beginning of the twentieth century, which may be described as upper middle class, comprised pastoralists and wealthy merchants and those in managerial positions, such as Weemalla's first owner, RM Steele. Weemalla, located on Corinda Hill, a popular site for the homes of members of this echelon from the 1880s, was appropriately sited for an elite residence.

By comparison to its southern counterparts Brisbane, by the 1890s was not a wealthy city and had few notably rich merchants or financiers. It was the location of headquarters for Queensland organisations and branch offices for interstate firms in the finance sector. None of the 87 insurance companies with offices or agents in Brisbane during the 1890s had its head office in Queensland.

As manager of the Queensland branch of the Victoria Insurance Company Ltd from 1901, Steele was a member of this upper echelon of Brisbane society. He was a member of the Brisbane Club, an exclusive men's club, and an early member of the Toowong Bowling Club (established 1904), which at the time was a sport with elite connotations. Accompanied by his wife and son, Steele arrived from South Australia where he had opened and managed the Victoria Insurance Co. in Adelaide. Initially they lived in Toowong then Indooroopilly, both middle-class residential areas of Brisbane.

In April 1908 Steele purchased two blocks of land, comprising 2 roods 19.5 perches (2,520 m^{2}), as the site of a new house for his growing family. In the following month local architecture firm, Hall & Dods advertised a tender for its construction. The job was won by Hall & Mayer and the house was completed during 1908–09 for £953.

Hall & Dods was a partnership between architects Francis Richard Hall and Robin Dods. Dods (1868–1920) was a New Zealand-born architect who lived briefly in Britain before coming to Brisbane in the 1870s. He later trained as an architect in Scotland and England under a number of esteemed architects who were working in the Arts and Crafts idiom. His architectural career began in Edinburgh in 1886, articled with architects Hay & Henderson. He attended evening classes at the Edinburgh Architectural Association until 1890 and formed a lasting friendship with (Sir) Robert Lorimer (1864–1929), eminent Scottish architect and fellow proponent of Arts and Crafts. In 1890 Dods moved to London, where he worked with the Fortifications Branch of the War Office and in the office of notable architect (Sir) Aston Webb. In 1891 he was admitted to the Royal Institute of British Architects and travelled in Italy. In 1894 Dods visited his mother in Brisbane and while there won a competition for a nurses' home at the Brisbane General Hospital (Royal Brisbane Hospital Nurses' Homes). He returned to Brisbane in 1896 and started in practice with architect Francis Hall as Hall & Dods. Dods has been acknowledged as "one of the most significant early 20th century Australian architects" and as a rare practitioner of the Arts and Crafts style in Queensland.

Arts and Crafts was an international design movement flourishing between 1860 and 1910, its influence continuing into the 1930s. It was led by artist and writer William Morris and architect Charles Voysey and was inspired by the writings of John Ruskin and Augustus Pugin. The style championed traditional craftsmanship using simple forms and often applied medieval, romantic or folk styles of decoration. Importantly, it valued local variations in traditions so that good design would have relevance within its context. Arts and Crafts architecture is characterised by solidity and heaviness through well-proportioned solid forms, wide porches and prominent steep roofs. The texture of ordinary materials is expressed in the detailing and building composition is asymmetrical.

The practice of Hall & Dods was the most influential source of modern design in Brisbane, producing a wide range of accomplished buildings, and was credited with achieving an "architectural revolution" in Brisbane. Dods was responsible for most of the design within the firm, integrating contemporary British design philosophies with the traditions of Queensland housing and the requirements of a subtropical climate, and producing practical, attractive, and finely detailed houses. The partnership ended in 1913, when Dods left to practice in Sydney. Dods died prematurely in 1920.

Dods' residential work employed local building techniques combined with a sophisticated discipline and a common-sense response to climate. Dods' houses were mostly built of timber with detailing that was a celebration of craftsmanship. The most noticeable characteristic of his Queensland houses (built between 1896 and 1917) was a general feeling of solidity and substance. This was the result of a number of design decisions, including designing a generous roof (often the largest element) continuous over the verandah and over a lower, rear washhouse. The roof was always simple in geometry and often finished with terracotta tiles, flat shingles or pan-and-tile profile, flat iron sheeting with a prominent rolled joint. Corrugated iron was used only as cost-saving measure. Generally low-set, the houses often had an enclosed or screened understorey to give the house a visually solid base. Individual elements were oversized to appear substantial as if under heavy loads. Bold, dark, earthy colours, darkly stained timber, rough-sawn weatherboards with mitred corners, roughcast rendering and face brickwork in dark colours were used to give the house a weighty gravity. The building materials and finishes were chosen to allow the building to mellow over time, providing it with a well-established appearance.

The house designs take a formalist approach to planning including formal entry halls and traditional planning arrangements. The plans were generated through a consideration of aspect, with living spaces well-oriented and internal layouts permitting cross ventilation. They are also notable for their informal spaces, a particular feature being the inclusion of generous verandah piazzas. The plans respond to the social needs of the clients in an honest and functional way. The houses were often provided with generous, considered service spaces including back halls and wash houses. The health and comfort of the occupants were major considerations. Ventilation devices included wide window and door openings, ventilated gables and ridges, and ventilation fleches. Piazzas were generous, allowing comfortably furnished, semi-outdoor living. Operable shading and enclosure of the piazza was sometimes achieved by adding timber vertical louvres above the verandah handrail, creating a room habitable in most weather. Interiors included fine decorative timber joinery and panelling. Fireplace surrounds and built-in cupboards were also a feature.

The composition of facades and circulation routes is a more nuanced element of Dods' houses and highlights his originality and artistic skill. Facades often only implied symmetry. Entries were often off-centre or perpendicular, emphasised by wide and expressive entry stairs. Projecting bay windows and corner fireplaces were recurrent elements.

Dods designed gardens as a setting for the house, a practice more common in Britain than in Queensland. They featured formal parterre gardens, terraces and walls, flower beds, tennis courts, hedges, topiaries, flowering ornamental trees, and geometric path and lawn layouts. Garden furniture and structures were designed including seats, pergolas, trellises, fences and gates.

Weemalla bears Dods' architectural signature fully. The house was a low-set, detached, timber structure with a large, carefully modelled roof. The house front faced north and the land sloped to the north-east providing ideal orientation. The front facade had an implied symmetrical composition with a small gable at either end, although in reality the plan was not symmetrical. Under the eastern gable were the wide entry stairs with emphatic, large balustrade. The western gable was enclosed and a hexagonal bay window projected from the centre. The entry stairs led to a wide piazza that took advantage of the north-eastern corner with views to the distant horizon. Entry into the house was at 90 degrees via a small, square entry hall that had a projecting bay window with built-in timber seat. The entry hall was centrally placed but access to it was from the side through a glazed front door with an over-scaled, semi-circular fanlight. A central corridor ran from front to back with living rooms on the east and bedrooms on the west. The lounge and dining room were the principal interior spaces and opened onto the front piazza. The dining room had a large chimney breast with a timber mantle and surround. Verandahs ran around all sides of the house, connecting with a large back hall/verandah at the rear. The western verandah, which faced Dewar Terrace, was semi-enclosed above the balustrade to provide privacy to the adjacent bedrooms as well as sun control. The northern end of the western verandah was enclosed to form a bathroom. The service spaces were at the rear of the house, with a semi-enclosed rear stair leading to a laundry under the kitchen.

The house sat centrally within the yard; if Dods designed a garden scheme, evidence of it has not been located.

In 1916 ownership of Weemalla was transferred to Steele's wife, Beatrice. Steele was resident at Corinda and served as the Queensland Manager for the Victoria Insurance Co. Ltd until July 1928 when he was transferred to Sydney as the New South Wales manager of the company. In September 1937 Weemalla was advertised for auction and described as a sound, commodious bungalow with a north-eastern aspect set on 99.5 perches (2,520 m^{2}). It was well built, with extra wide verandahs, four bedrooms, a maid's bedroom, a hall, large dining and lounge with an arch and brick fireplace. It had gas and fuel stoves, enamel bath, basin, and geyser. Its laundry had set-in tubs on a concrete floor. There was car accommodation and beautiful grounds with space for a tennis court. The house was not sold, however, and in September 1939 Steele's elder son William and his family moved into the house and resided there for the next two decades.

RM Steele died in Sydney in August 1940, aged 74, only a month after his retirement from more than 58 years service with the Victoria Insurance Co., during which he had represented it in Adelaide, Brisbane and Sydney. He was survived by his widow and two sons. Beatrice Steele died in 1960 leaving Weemalla to son William who subsequently sold the house in 1963.

Weemalla remains largely unchanged since construction. It has been sold several times since 1963 and minor modifications have occurred including the enclosure of parts of the verandahs with glazing, the erection of a carport at the western side c. 1989 by Riddel Architecture, and the construction of an in-ground pool on the eastern side. In 1964 an extension accommodating a bedroom and bathroom was added to the rear (south-western) corner of the house. The design for the small extension was by Brisbane architecture firm Job & Froud, well known for their design of the Torbreck home units completed in 1960. Consistent with their other work, the extension at Weemalla was designed in an International style. This extension has been refurbished and reconfigured several times including in c. 1989 by Riddel Architecture when the entrance stair was rebuilt and the bathroom and kitchen refurbished.

In 2013 Weemalla remains a family residence.

== Description ==
Weemalla is a detached timber house in a suburban area of Corinda, located 11 kilometres (6.8 mi) south-west of the centre of Brisbane. It is on a corner comprising two allotments totalling 2,516 square metres (27,080 sq ft) with Ruthven Street to the north and side access from Dewar Terrace to the west. The surrounding allotments are of similar size and have houses of similar age and scale. Weemalla is located centrally on its land with large trees, an in-ground swimming pool, and carport.

The house, approximately 14 by 24 metres (46 ft × 79 ft), is timber-framed and -clad, set on timber stumps with a large hipped and gabled roof. It is in an Arts and Crafts style. The roof is conspicuously large and clad with corrugated metal sheets with a ventilated ridge cap. There are two brick chimneys of red face brick with bands of maroon brick and cement rendered cappings. The wide eaves have soffits either of fibrous sheet material or spaced timber battens, the latter being the original condition. A timber verandah with over-scaled posts and a battened balustrade wraps the north and east sides. The walls are clad with weatherboards that also enclose the majority of the understorey.

The north-facing front elevation is flanked by small projecting gables with decorative awnings and timber dentil work. The roofs of the awnings are clad with pan-and-rib metal sheets. A narrow verandah runs across the front of the house between these gables, widening at the north-eastern corner to form a generous verandah piazza. Entry is via a wide timber stair onto the piazza under the north-eastern gable. The stair balustrade and entrance feature timber battens, large brackets, and other over-scaled timber elements. The north-western gable shelters a projecting room (the bathroom) and has a bay window supported on large timber brackets.

The western elevation, facing Dewar Terrace, has a verandah enclosed with aluminium-framed, sliding windows and weatherboards. At the southern end of the verandah is a small lattice-enclosed entrance into the back hall.

The rear elevation has a wide verandah enclosed with aluminium-framed, sliding windows and a large projecting gable at the eastern end containing the kitchen and service zones. Below the kitchen, the understorey is enclosed to form a laundry. A large painted, brick chimney breast is at the centre of the gable and is flanked by windows.

A verandah runs the length of the eastern (side) elevation and is enclosed at the southern end by weatherboards and timber-framed casements.

The main entrance timber door has bolection moulded panels and glazing surrounded by fan and side lights forming an unusual semi-circular feature. The glazing is clear and green leaded glass and the fanlight is operable, retaining an original brass mechanism. The door opens into a small foyer with a bay window with built in timber seat. The foyer ceiling is plaster with decorative mouldings.

The house layout is organised off a central hall with rooms either side; bedrooms are to the west and living rooms are to the east. At the back of the house the hall ends in a wider back hall adjacent to a kitchen/service zone including a pantry and servant's room. A lattice-enclosed external stair connects the back hall with a laundry enclosure under the house. A bathroom is located at the north-western corner, accessible from the western verandah and from the master bedroom. Two small toilets are accommodated within enclosures on the western verandah.

Generally, the rooms have timber board floors, timber tongue-and-groove board walls and ceilings with moulded timber skirtings, architraves, belt rails, and cornices.

The ceilings are generally 3.3 metres (11 ft) high with a lower ceiling (2.7 metres (8 ft 10 in)) in the hall. The principal rooms (drawing and dining rooms) are connected by a large square opening with an elaborate architrave. These two rooms have larger and more elaborate skirtings and cornices than other rooms and the dining room has a fireplace with a decorative fire surround of painted timber panelling including a small amount of white marble.

Internal doors are timber with moulded panelling and operable timber panelled fanlights that retain original brass opening mechanisms. Timber French doors with fanlights have fine, moulded glazing bars and clear glass lights and open onto the verandah from most rooms. One set of French doors has been modified into one large sliding door and another set has been relocated to enclose the verandah nearby. Other windows are double-hung timber sashes or timber casements with fine, moulded glazing bars and clear glass. Much of the original door and window furniture is retained. The house has several built-in storage cupboards with timber shelves. The opening between the foyer and the hall has an arched and battened fanlight. An early bell system survives with buttons in the main bedroom and the drawing room connected to bells in the back hall.

The kitchen, servant's room, pantry, and large storage cupboard open from the back hall. The kitchen has a fireplace with a painted brick chimney breast.

The laundry under the kitchen has a concrete floor. The room retains early or original fixtures including a concrete washtub and a copper tub built into the chimney breast.

A small, timber-framed building is connected by a covered walkway to the south-western corner of the main house. The building has a hipped roof clad with corrugated metal sheets, weatherboard clad walls and accommodates a bedroom and bathroom. It is not of cultural heritage significance.

The garden includes a large jacaranda (Jacaranda mimosifolia), camphor laurel (Cinnamomum camphora), and macadamia (possibly Macadamia tetraphylla). An early timber fence post is located at the north-west corner of the yard. It bears two different sets of post notches suggesting the Dewar Terrace fence was post-and-rail and the Ruthven Street fence was more finely crafted. The grounds contain a carport and swimming pool.

The north-eastern piazza has views to the north-east of the surrounding suburbs and distant horizon. It is well positioned to receive the cool summer breezes from this direction as well as winter sun.

== Heritage listing ==
Weemalla was listed on the Queensland Heritage Register on 9 August 2013 having satisfied the following criteria.

Weemalla (1909) is important in illustrating the contribution of notable architect, Robert Smith (Robin) Dods, to the evolution of Queensland architecture.

Weemalla is important for providing evidence of the lifestyle of Brisbane's prosperous elite in the outer suburbs in the early twentieth century. Built for the manager of a national insurance company, it also reflects the development of Brisbane as a commercial centre from the 1890s, not only as headquarters of Queensland companies but also as a branch centre for overseas and interstate companies.

Weemalla is a fine, intact example of the high-quality residential work of Dods that is characterised by a pervading sense of tradition, solidity, and an honest use of materials. Designed in an Arts and Crafts idiom, the low-set timber house has deliberately oversized timber elements and openings; verandah piazza; steep dominant roof; finely detailed, built-in timber furniture; a well-considered service zone; and an interior layout that optimises cross ventilation and solar orientation.

Standing on a rise within a leafy suburban landscape, the low-set house with dominant roof and generous garden is important for its Arts and Crafts aesthetic. Notable for its fine craftsmanship, it features a skilful arrangement of informal and formal living spaces. A sense of simple elegant suburban domesticity is engendered by its generous verandahs and piazza and spacious living rooms.
