= Corinda =

- Suburb
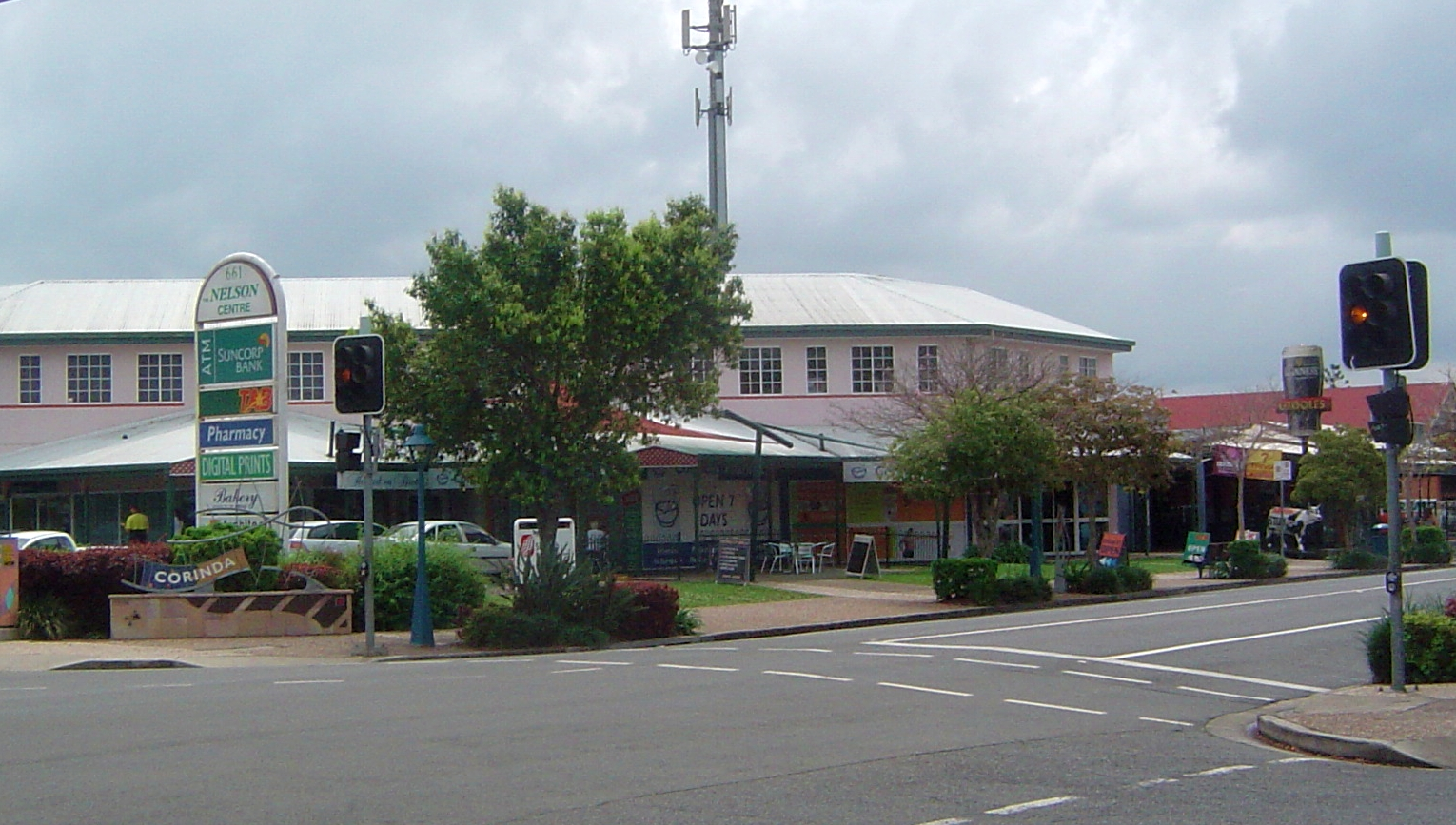
- Shops along Oxley Road

- Interactive map of Corinda
- Coordinates: 27.5425°S 152.9838°E
- Country: Australia
- State: Queensland
- City: Brisbane
- LGA: City of Brisbane (Tennyson Ward)
- Location: 12.8 km (8.0 mi) SW of Brisbane CBD
- Established: 1862

Government
  - State electorates: Mount Ommaney; Miller
  - Federal division: Moreton

Area
  - Total: 3.0 km^{2} (1.2 sq mi)

Population
  - Total: 5,555 (2021 census)
  - Density: 1,852/km^{2} (4,800/sq mi)
- Time zone: UTC+10:00 (AEST)
- Postcode: 4075
Suburbs around Corinda
Fig Tree Pocket	Sherwood	Sherwood
Fig Tree Pocket	Corinda	Rocklea
Oxley	Oxley	Rocklea

Corinda is a suburb in the City of Brisbane, Queensland, Australia. In the 2021 census, Corinda had a population of 5,555 people.

== History ==
The suburb takes its name from the Corinda railway station, which in turn was likely named after a local cattle station owned by Sir Arthur Palmer, which he named after his Corinda pastoral station near Aramac.

Corinda was first settled by non-indigenous people in the 1860s as a small farming community. Among the original settlers was the Francis family who in 1862 purchased 21 acres, which extended from the Brisbane River to Francis Lookout, a local heritage listed landmark on Dewar Terrace. Francis Lookout survives to this day, and includes a small burial ground opened in 1862. Its ten graves include those of some of the pioneer settlers. The oldest of the graves is of Clement Francis who died in 1863. The lychgate, erected by Angela Francis, dates to 1902. Most of the original older-style Queenslander homes date back to the colonial period and were built high on the hills around the lookout.

The first rail line opened in 1874. A small commercial district on Oxley Road gradually grew around it. The Corinda School of Arts (now municipal library) is one of the earliest surviving buildings on this strip and is a small timber structure built in 1895. The commercial district rapidly developed after the 1920s. Many large bungalow styled homes were built on the floodplain toward Oxley Creek during this time.

In October 1883, 140 subdivided allotments of 'Sherwood Junction Estate' were auctioned by J. Cameron. A map advertising the auction shows the Estate was at the junction of the South Brisbane Railway Line.

In 1879, the local government area of Yeerongpilly Division was created. In 1891, parts of Yeerongpilly Division were excised to create Sherwood Division becoming a Shire in 1903 which contained the suburb of Corinda. In 1925, the Shire of Sherwood was amalgamated into the City of Brisbane.

In June 1889, 145 allotments were available for sale in the Oxley Station Terraces Estate by T. A. Lawson, Auctioneers.

In 1915, seeing a need for more Catholic schools, Roman Catholic Archbishop of Brisbane, James Duhig, invited a number of orders of teaching Sisters to come to Brisbane. One of those orders was the Daughters of Our Lady of the Sacred Heart who came to Brisbane and established St Joseph's Catholic Primary School, which opened on 28 January 1917 with 50 students. The school was operated by the Sisters until 1993, when a lay principal was appointed.

In July 1920, 32 subdivided allotments of the Corinda Park Estate were auctioned by Cameron Bros. A map advertising the auction states the Estate was 10 minutes walk from both Corinda and Oxley railway stations. The Open View Estate advertised 32 allotments in May 1923.

Corinda State School opened on 1 June 1927.

St Aidan's Anglican Girls' School opened on 5 February 1929.

On 3 December 1933, the Montrose Home for Crippled opened in Swann Road, Taringa in Montrose, the home of Presbyterian philanthropist George Marchant which he donated for the purpose. When the home needed larger premies, in 1937, Marchant purchased Ardeyne, a 10-acre (4.0 ha) site in Corinda for the long-term operation of the home under the management of the Queensland Society for Crippled Children. The home closed in 2001 as the organisation transitioned away from institutional care towards community and in-home support services. The home had its own school. The Montrose Home School for Crippled Children opened in January 1934. In March 1934 it was renamed Montrose Special School. The school closed on 2 June 2006. The home and school were at 54 Consort Street in Corinda (27.5433°S 152.9765°E).

Our Lady of the Sacred Heart College opened in January 1941 and closed in December 1972.

Corinda State High School opened on 25 January 1960.

The Corinda RSL was established in 1964 and now trades as the Sherwood Services Club.

The Corinda Library became a branch of the Brisbane City Council library in 1966 and had a major refurbishment in 2016.

The suburb experienced a landslip during the 1974 Brisbane flood which affected more than 20 houses.

== Demographics ==
In the 2011 census, Corinda had a population of 4,695 people, consisting of 52.3% female and 47.7% male. The median age of the Corinda population was 39 years, two years above the Australian median. 71.8% of people living in Corinda were born in Australia, similar to the national average of 69.8%. The other top responses for country of birth were England 4.9%, New Zealand 2.9%, India 1.1%, Philippines 0.8%, Germany 0.7%. 82.9% of people speak only English at home, while other languages include 0.9% Vietnamese, 0.8% Spanish, 0.8% Mandarin, 0.6% Cantonese, 0.6% Arabic.

In the 2016 census, Corinda had a population of 5,064 people.

In the 2021 census, Corinda had a population of 5,555 people.

== Heritage listings ==
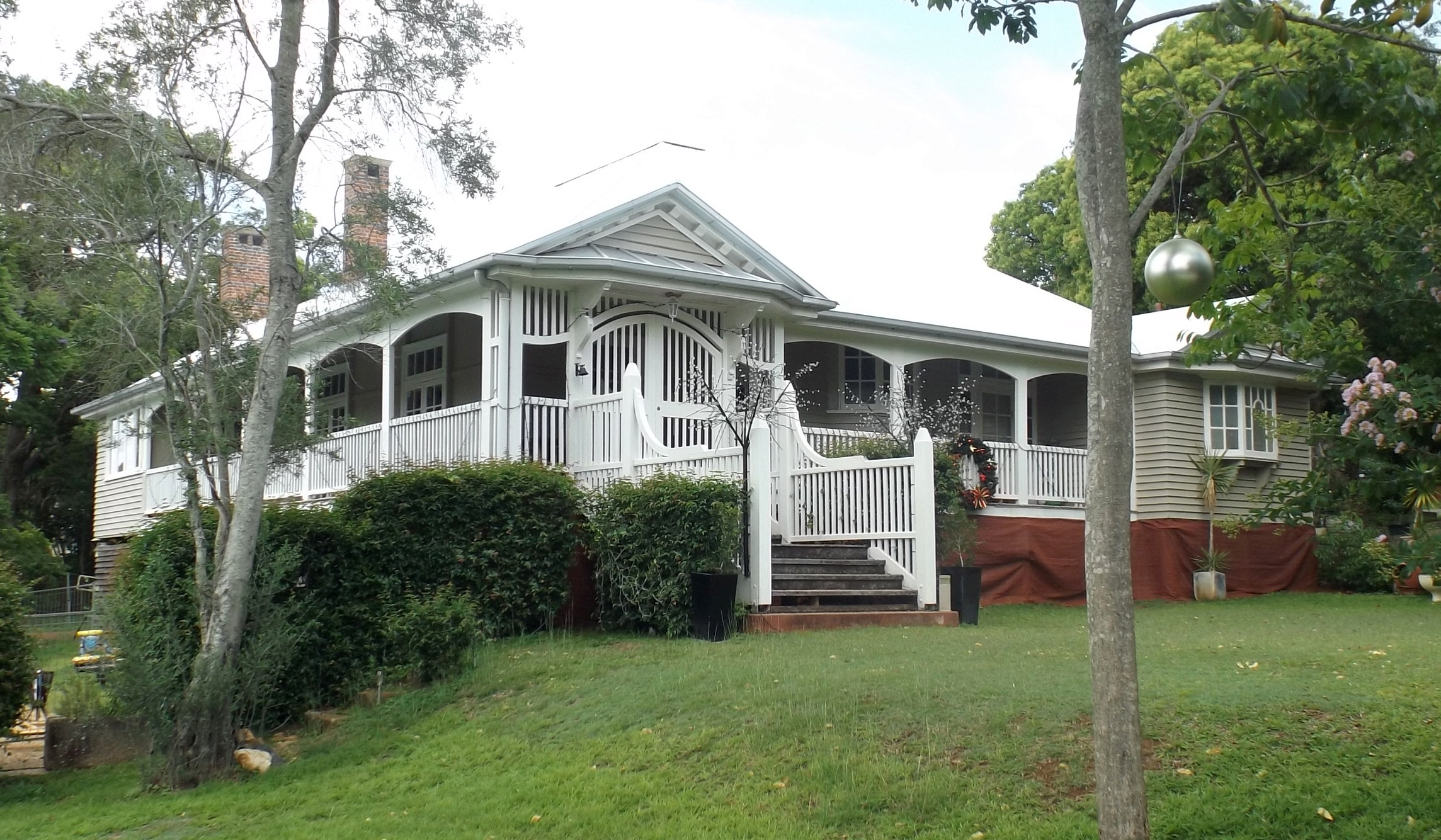
Weemalla was listed on the Queensland Heritage Register in 2013

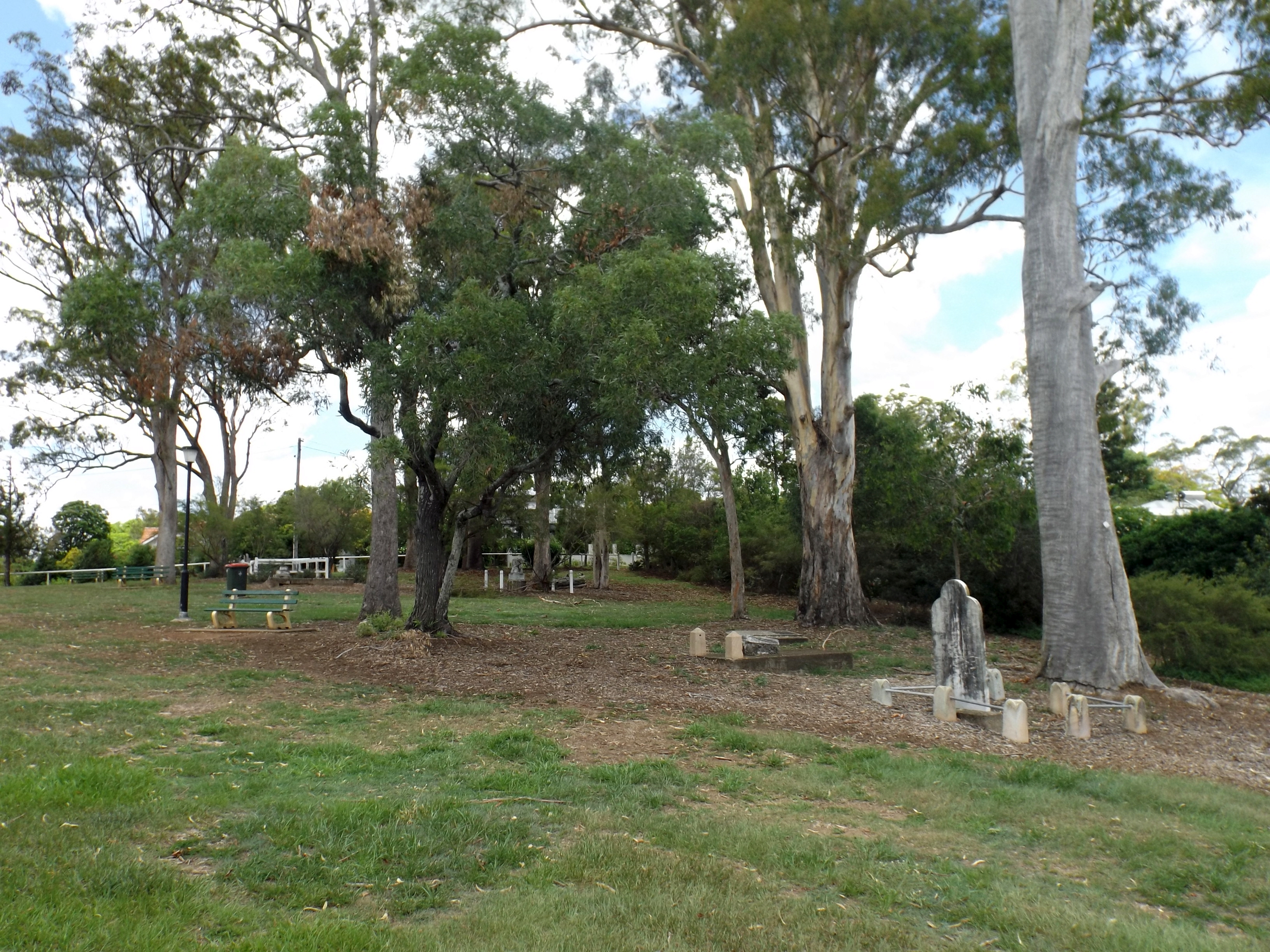
Francis Lookout graves, 2014

Corinda has a number of heritage-listed sites, including:

- Monkton, 7 Ardoyne Road
- Francis Lookout, 157 Dewar Terrace
- Weemalla, 62 Ruthven Street

== Open space ==
Corinda has two main parks both sharing the same name but separated at either end of the suburb. One is a forest reserve along the Brisbane River which includes Carrington Rocks and Carrington Boat Club. The other is on the floodplain of Oxley Creek near the bowls club and state school. The historic Francis Lookout reserve has another small park used for the traditional local Carols by Candlelight celebrations run by various local church and school groups. The Sherwood Arboretum borders the suburb but is located in Sherwood.

== Places of worship ==
- Christ Community Church West, Cliveden Avenue
- St John's Lutheran Church, corner Oxley Rd and Clewley Street
- St Joseph's Catholic Church, corner Oxley Rd and Martindale Street
- Grace Bible Church Corinda, corner Hassall and Clara Street

== Transport ==
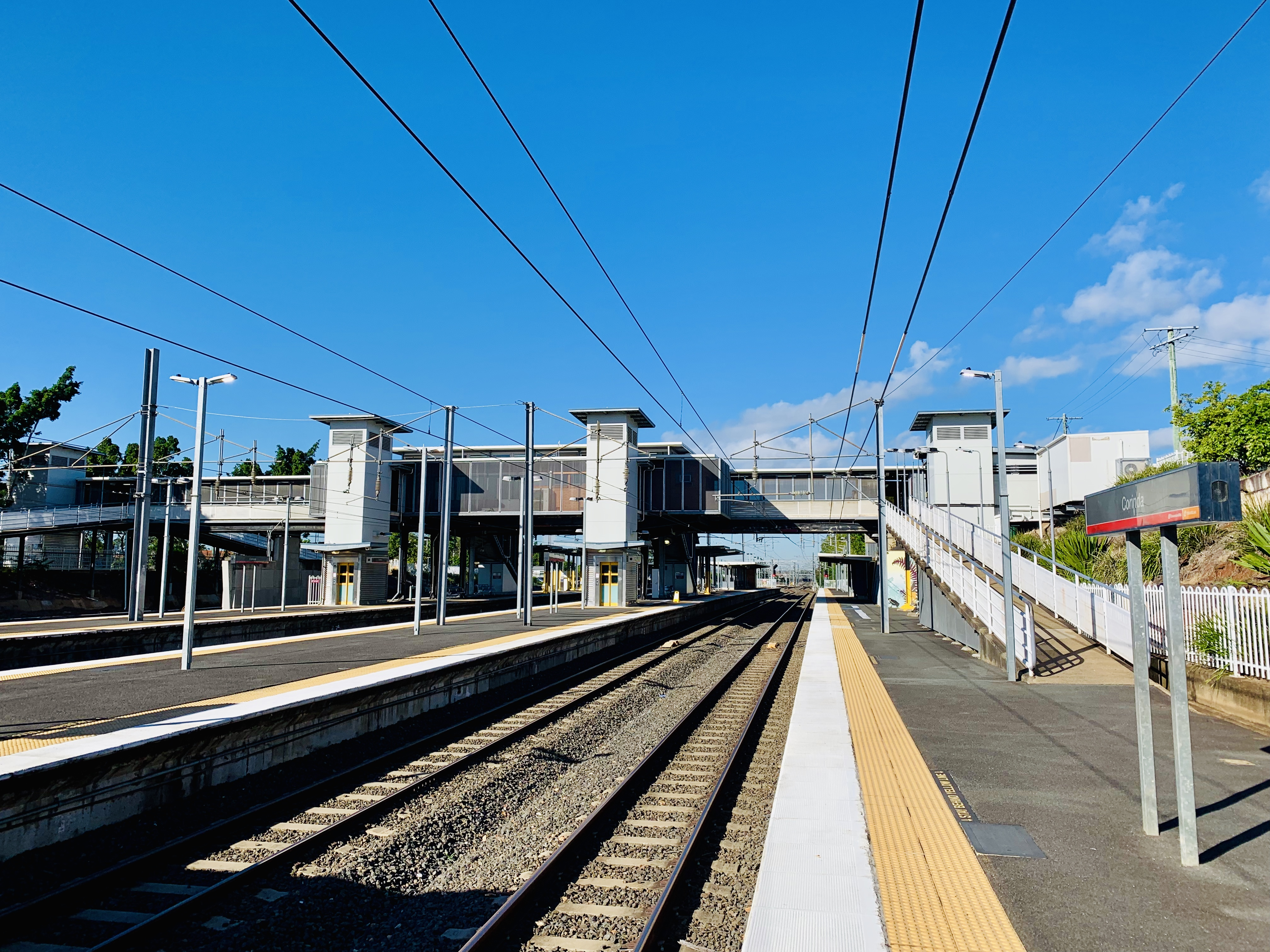
Corinda Railway Station

The Corinda railway station provides residents with access to the Brisbane CBD, servicing many suburbs and providing access to many popular entertainment and educational venues along the way, including the Indooroopilly Shopping Centre and the University of Queensland. It is also a timetabled stop for Queensland Rail Travel's Westlander service to Charleville. As a result of changes to transport planning in July 2011, there is also a less frequent bus service (Bus 104) to Tennyson railway station.

== Education ==
Corinda State School is a government primary (Prep–6) school for boys and girls at 330 Cliveden Avenue (27.5493°S 152.9815°E). In 2017, the school had an enrolment of 575 students with 45 teachers (39 full-time equivalent) and 23 non-teaching staff (14 full-time equivalent). It includes a special education program.

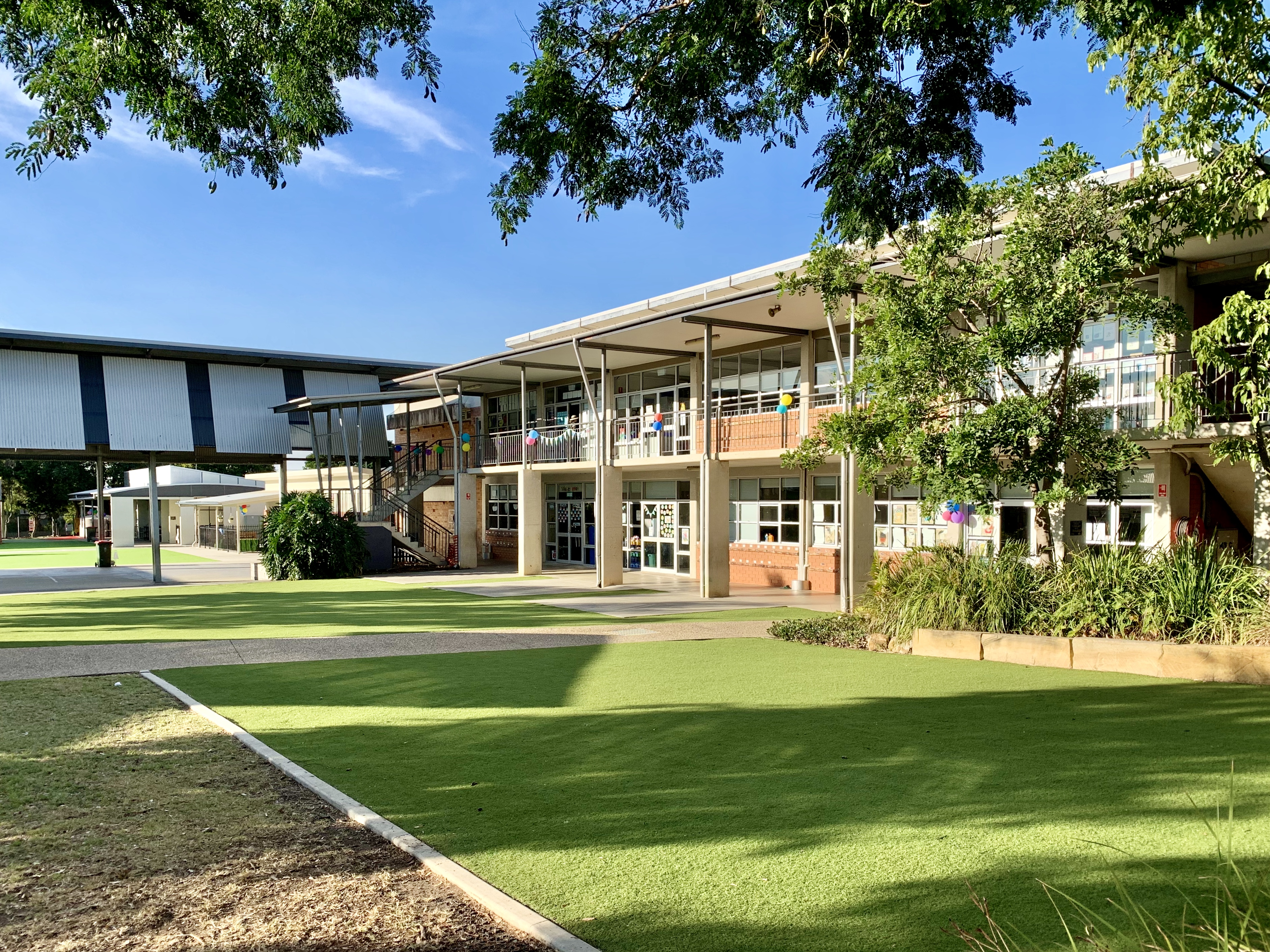
St Joseph's Catholic Primary School, Corinda, Queensland

St Joseph's Primary School is a Catholic primary (Prep–6) school for boys and girls at 28 Clewley Street (27.5380°S 152.9825°E) near the Corinda Village Shopping Centre. In 2017, the school had an enrolment of 456 students with 33 teachers (28 full-time equivalent) and 13 non-teaching staff (6 full-time equivalent).

Corinda State High School is a government secondary (7–12) school for boys and girls at 46 Pratten Street (27.5443°S 152.9864°E). In 2017, the school had an enrolment of 1788 students with 138 teachers (132 full-time equivalent) and 55 non-teaching staff (43 full-time equivalent). It includes a special education program.

St Aidan's Anglican Girls School is a private primary and secondary (Prep–12) school for girls at 11 Ruthven Street (27.5387°S 152.9787°E) near the railway line. In 2017, the school had an enrolment of 711 students with 71 teachers (60 full-time equivalent) and 76 non-teaching staff (45 full-time equivalent).

== Amenities ==
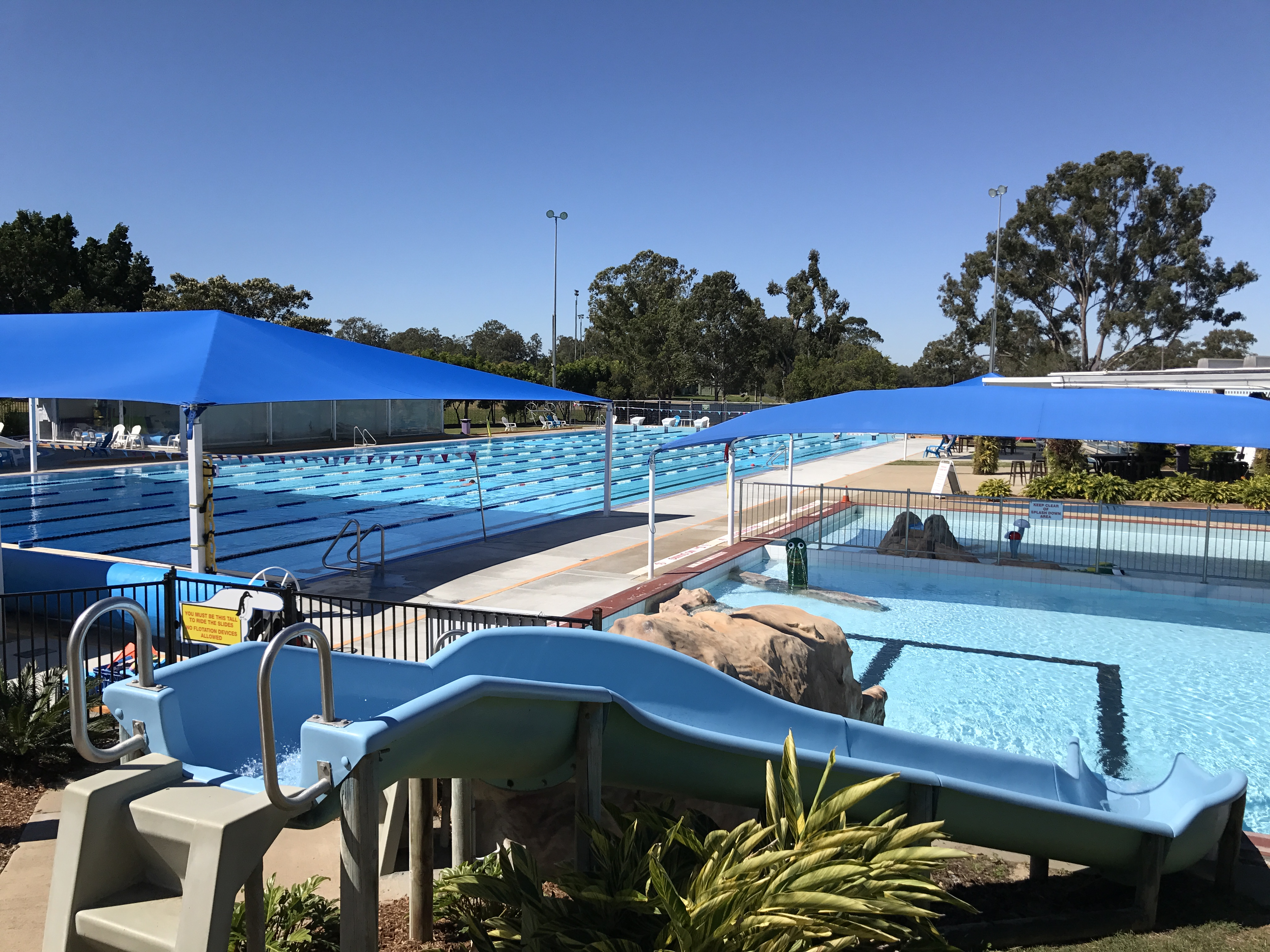
Dunlop Park Memorial Pool

The Brisbane City Council operates a public library at 641 Oxley Road.

The Dunlop Park Memorial Swimming Pool is a 50-metre, heated, outdoor pool at 794 Oxley Road.

The Corinda Horse and Pony Club is located at the end of Rinora Street.

== Natural hazards ==
As the suburb is bounded by the Brisbane River and Oxley Creek, a small percentage of low lying areas of the suburb are susceptible, in extreme circumstances, to flooding. Parts of the suburb are also susceptible to landslip, as demonstrated in the 1974 Corinda Landslip.
