= Swain House =

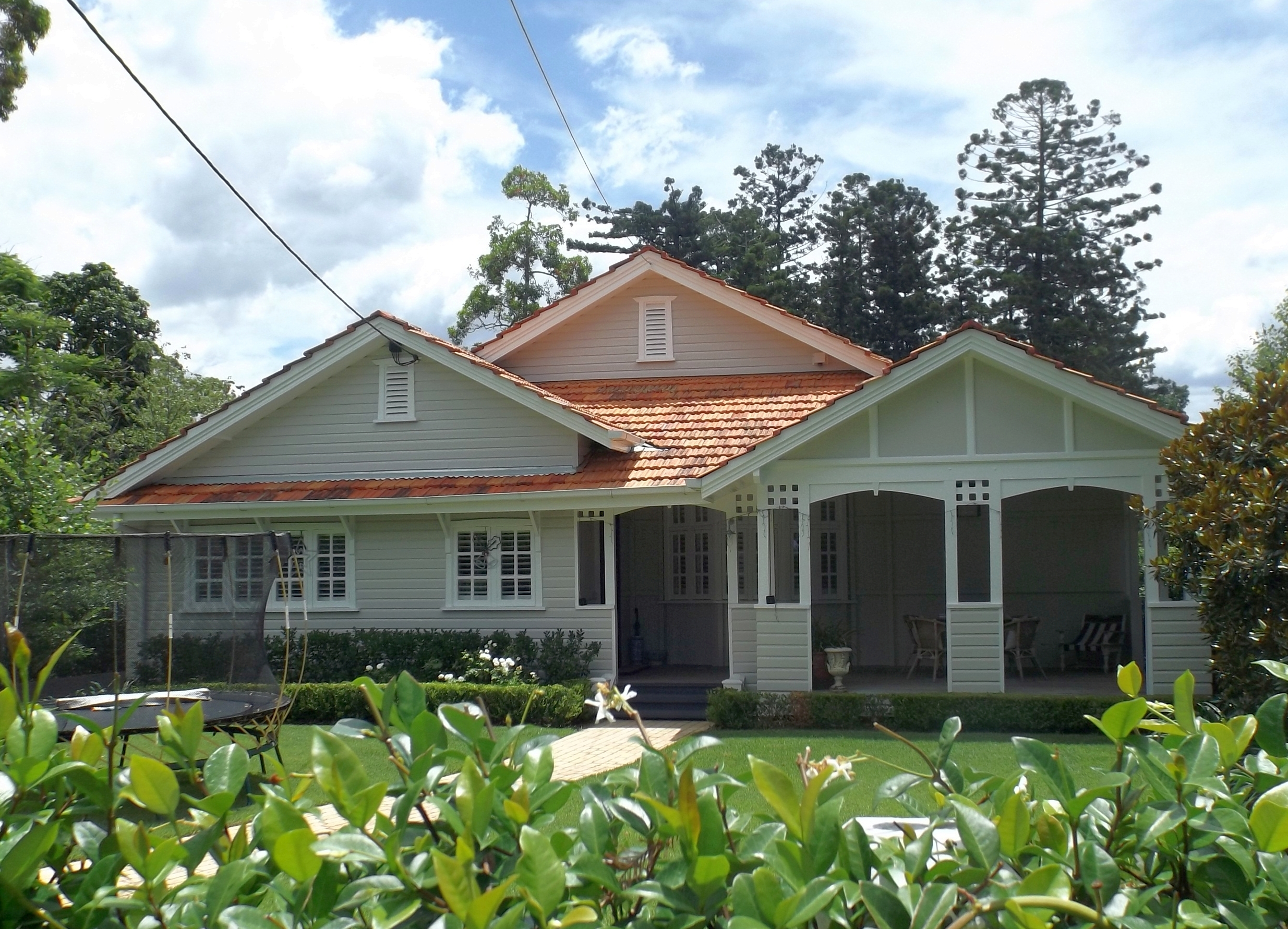
- Front lawn and entrance, 2014

- Location within Queensland Location within Australia
- 27.5164°S 152.9688°E
- Location: 139 Laurel Avenue, Chelmer, City of Brisbane, Queensland, Australia

History
- Design period: 1919–1930s (interwar period)
- Built: 1920s–
- Built for: Edward Swain

Site notes
- Architectural style: Californian bungalow

Queensland Heritage Register
- Official name: Swain House
- Type: state heritage (built, landscape)
- Designated: 12 December 2003
- Reference no.: 602427
- Significant period: 1920s (fabric, historical)
- Significant components: trees/plantings, tennis court, garden/grounds, residential accommodation – main house

Swain House is a heritage-listed detached house at 139 Laurel Avenue, Chelmer, City of Brisbane, Queensland, Australia. It was built from the 1920s onwards. It was added to the Queensland Heritage Register on 12 December 2003.

== History ==
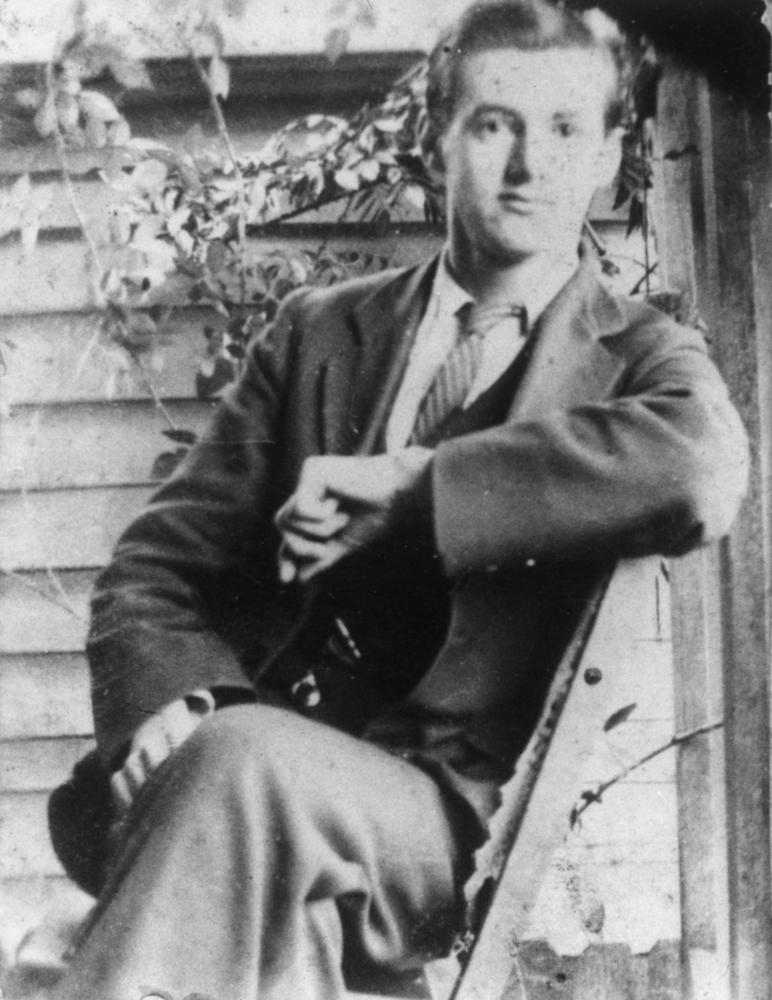
Edward Harold Fulcher Swain

Edward Swain purchased the 1.5 acres of riverfront land for this house in 1920 when he was Director of Forests in Queensland. He took out a mortgage for £1,300 and constructed a California Bungalow style home in which he was living by 1925. He surrounded the house with extensive plantings of native and exotic trees reflecting his life's work in forestry.

Edward Harold Fulcher Swain was born in Sydney in 1883 and was the first Cadet Forester in the New South Wales Forestry Branch in 1899. He studied forestry in Montana, USA in 1915 and on his return became a District Forest Inspector in Queensland. Between 1918 and 1924 he was Director of Forests in Queensland. During this time he set aside large tracts of hoop pine forest in the Brisbane and Mary River valleys and planted areas of introduced species. On the abolition of the office of Director in 1924, he became inaugural Chairman of the Queensland Forestry Board until 1932. This Board was responsible for the management and control of the State Forests and National Parks.

Swain laid the foundations of modern forestry economics in Queensland. His new ideas and strong personality frequently brought him into conflict with others and he was often a controversial figure in an industry deeply rooted in traditional practice. Amongst other achievements, he pioneered forest assessment surveys, promoted the permanent reservation of good forests and forest land, improved pricing policies which led to a better use of timber resources and expanded staff training and the activities of his department. He wrote a number of books on forestry, was a founder of the Australian Forestry School at the Australian National University and supported community interest in trees. In 1924, he was instrumental in establishing the Sherwood Arboretum, a park on the Brisbane River, which is dedicated to the growth of indigenous trees.

In 1932, Swain publicly campaigned against the indiscriminate allocation of forested land as land grants, at the time a policy of the incumbent National Party Government. Although the Labor Party won the election, in the controversy and inquiries which followed Swain lost his job. He became a research consultant for Australian Paper Manufacturers in South Australia before becoming Commissioner for Forests in New South Wales until his official retirement in 1948. Between 1951 and 1955 he was United Nations Forestry Consultant in Ethiopia. Swain died in Brisbane in July 1970.

His daughter Nancy and her husband occupied the family home from 1946. She shared her father's interest in indigenous species and planted rainforest trees in the grounds.

The house itself reflects Swain's obsession with exploring the potential of Australian timbers. It was constructed of rosewood with the intention of proving that this timber, then not well regarded for the purpose, was suitable for building. The house also displays Queensland timbers to advantage, the joinery including panelling in pine and kauri.

Most of the trees planted by Swain and his family survive and are now large trees that make a major contribution to the landscape of the area. The Alan Fletcher Research Station of the Department of Primary Industries nearby uses the hoop pine plantation for research into forestry practices.

The house held a number of social events including a local private schools annual dance in the year of 2007.

== Description ==
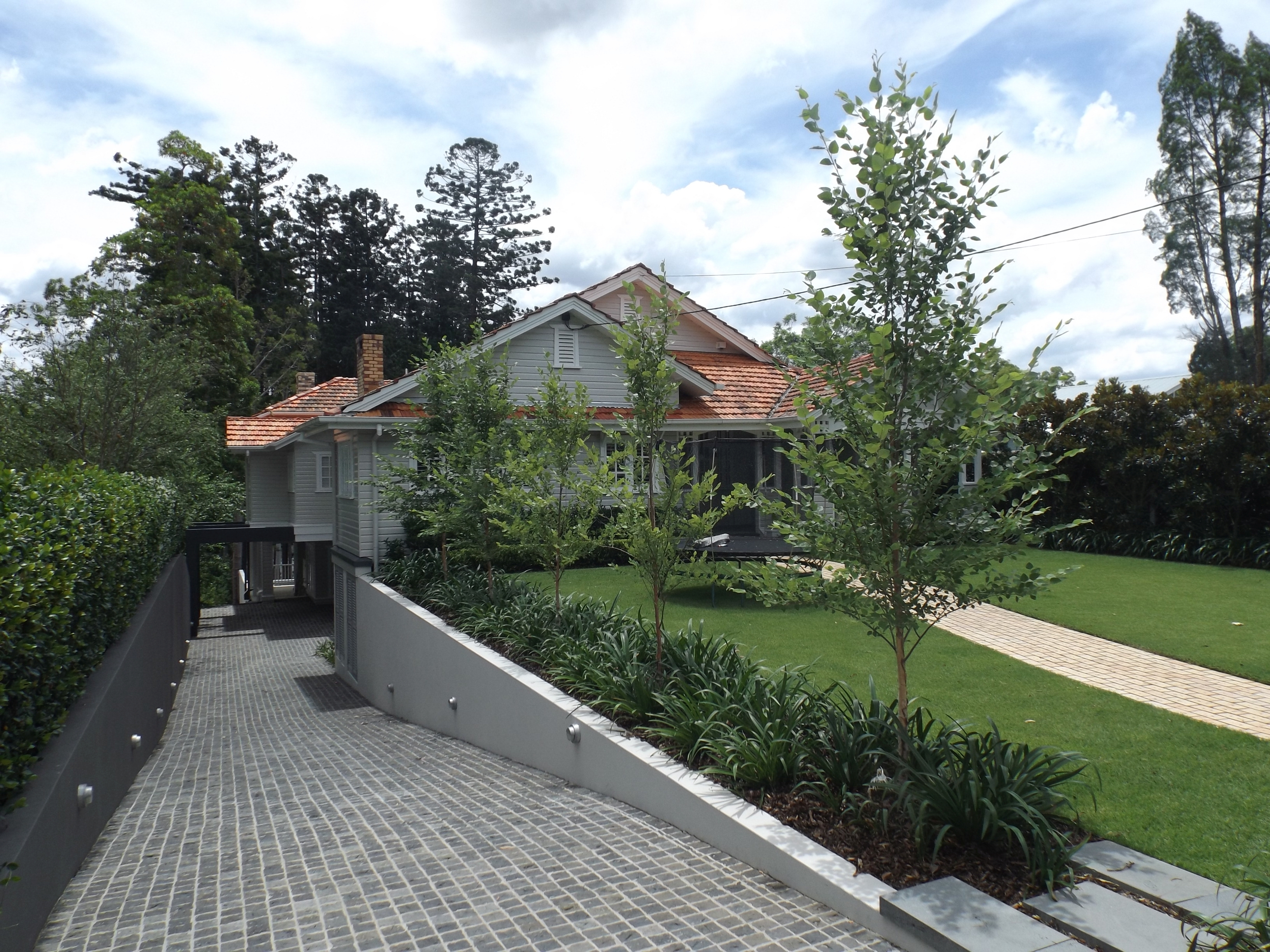
Residence and driveway, 2014

The Swain house is a single storey timber dwelling with a triple gabled front elevation. It has a hipped roof clad in terracotta tiles.

The interior is substantially intact and has a sunroom at the front of the house. The dining and living areas are linked and there is a large sandstone fireplace in the living room. The dining room is lined with timber and a two-way, lead-lighted cupboard, previously linking the dining room and kitchen, now links the kitchen and former breakfast room. At the right hand side of the house are bedrooms and at the rear there is a bathroom, sitting room and maid's room. Part of the rear verandah has been enclosed to form a bedroom. An open deck has been added to the rear and left-hand side of the house.

The house is set in an extensive and intact 1920s garden that includes a grass tennis court. The garden contains most of the native and exotic trees planted by Swain in the 1920s and many fruit and rainforest trees. The grounds contain a large plantation of hoop and kauri pine trees near the bank of Brisbane River and a number of mature cedar trees. A row of mature kauri trees lines the southern boundary of the land and tallow wood, crows ash, satinay and yellow pine trees are found in a group to the right of the site behind the tennis court. On a slope to the rear of the house are fruit trees including a loquat, mulberry and mandarin and two eucalyptus trees.

== Heritage listing ==
Swain House was listed on the Queensland Heritage Register on 12 December 2003 having satisfied the following criteria.

The place is important in demonstrating the evolution or pattern of Queensland's history.

The Swain house was built in the early 1920s on a 1.5 acre block of land fronting the Brisbane River at Chelmer. The land has not been subdivided since the house was built and as a comparatively modest family home in grounds of this size and location, it illustrates and early phase in the development of Brisbane.

The place is important in demonstrating the principal characteristics of a particular class of cultural places.

The house is a good example its type and era, being substantially intact in both form and internal features. It is rare in retaining its original setting in extensive grounds with mature indigenous trees on the bank of the Brisbane River. Such features as the maid's room and grass tennis court, which illustrate a way of life now passed, are uncommon.

The place is important because of its aesthetic significance.

The house and its setting, particularly the stands of mature trees planted by EHF Swain, have aesthetic value and make an important contribution to the streetscape.

The place has a special association with the life or work of a particular person, group or organisation of importance in Queensland's history.

EHF Swain was a nationally significant figure in the development of the forestry industry in Australia and his house and tree plantings have a strong association with his life and work, illustrating his interest in timber and forestry research. The hoop pine plantation continues to be of value for research purposes.
