= Sherwood, Queensland =

Sherwood
- Suburb
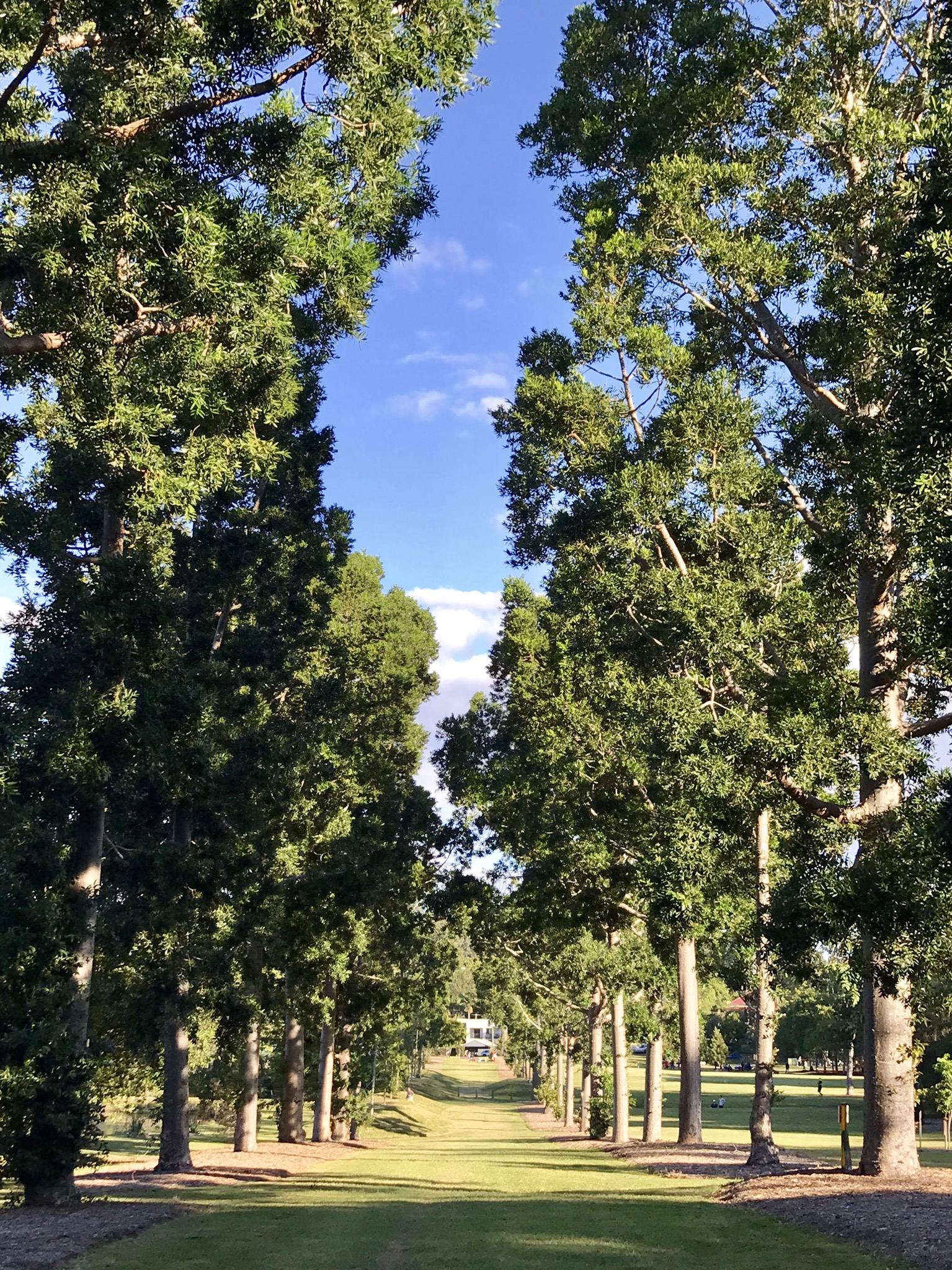
- Sherwood Arboretum, 2018

- Interactive map of Sherwood
- Coordinates: 27.5314°S 152.9830°E
- Country: Australia
- State: Queensland
- City: Brisbane
- LGA: City of Brisbane (Tennyson Ward)
- Location: 11.7 km (7.3 mi) SW of Brisbane CBD

Government
  - State electorates: Miller; Mount Ommaney
  - Federal division: Moreton

Area
  - Total: 2.4 km^{2} (0.93 sq mi)

Population
  - Total: 6,082 (2021 census)
  - Density: 2,530/km^{2} (6,560/sq mi)
- Time zone: UTC+10:00 (AEST)
- Postcode: 4075
Suburbs around Sherwood
Fig Tree Pocket	Graceville	Tennyson
Fig Tree Pocket	Sherwood	Rocklea
Fig Tree Pocket	Corinda	Rocklea

Sherwood is a suburb in the City of Brisbane, Queensland, Australia. In the 2021 census, Sherwood had a population of 6,082 people.

== Geography ==
Sherwood is 8.3 kilometres (5.2 mi) south west of the Brisbane CBD (Note: Distance calculated based on coordinates given in and) and bounded by the median of the Brisbane River towards the west.

Oxley Road is the main thoroughfare through the suburb, entering from the north (Graceville) and exiting to the south (Corinda). The Ipswich railway line runs parallel to and west of Oxley Avenue, with the suburb served by Sherwood railway station (27.5310°S 152.9795°E).

The suburb is mostly low and medium-density housing with a retail strip centred along Sherwood Road.

== History ==
West Oxley State School opened on Monday 25 March 1867. It was renamed Sherwood State School in 1878. The first head teacher was Major William Jenyns Boyd. He was born in Paris in 1842 and migrated to Australia in 1862. In 1868, Oliver Radcliffe was the first name on the roll as a pupil teacher. He became a teacher, a headmaster and then a school inspector. By his retirement in 1932, he was the Chief Inspector for the Queensland Education Department. He personally inspected schools from Coolangatta to Thursday Island and from Rockhampton to the border with South Australia.

In 1879, the local government area of Yeerongpilly Division was created. In 1891 parts of Yeerongpilly Division were excised to create Sherwood Division becoming a Shire in 1903 which contained the suburb of Sherwood. In 1925, the Shire of Sherwood was amalgamated into the City of Brisbane.

On Saturday 24 October 1885, auctioneers Arthur Martin and Co. offered 268 suburban blocks (mostly 16 perches) in the township of Sherwood Estate. Most of the blocks were in the area bounded by Oxley Road to the west, Government Road (now Sherwood Road) to the north and the Corinda–Yeerongpilly railway line to the south-east. The remaining blocks were south of the railway line on Railway Terrace. However, only about 40 blocks were sold. On Saturday 23 June 1888 auctioneer John F. Buckland offered the remaining 200 suburban blocks in the township of Sherwood Estate.

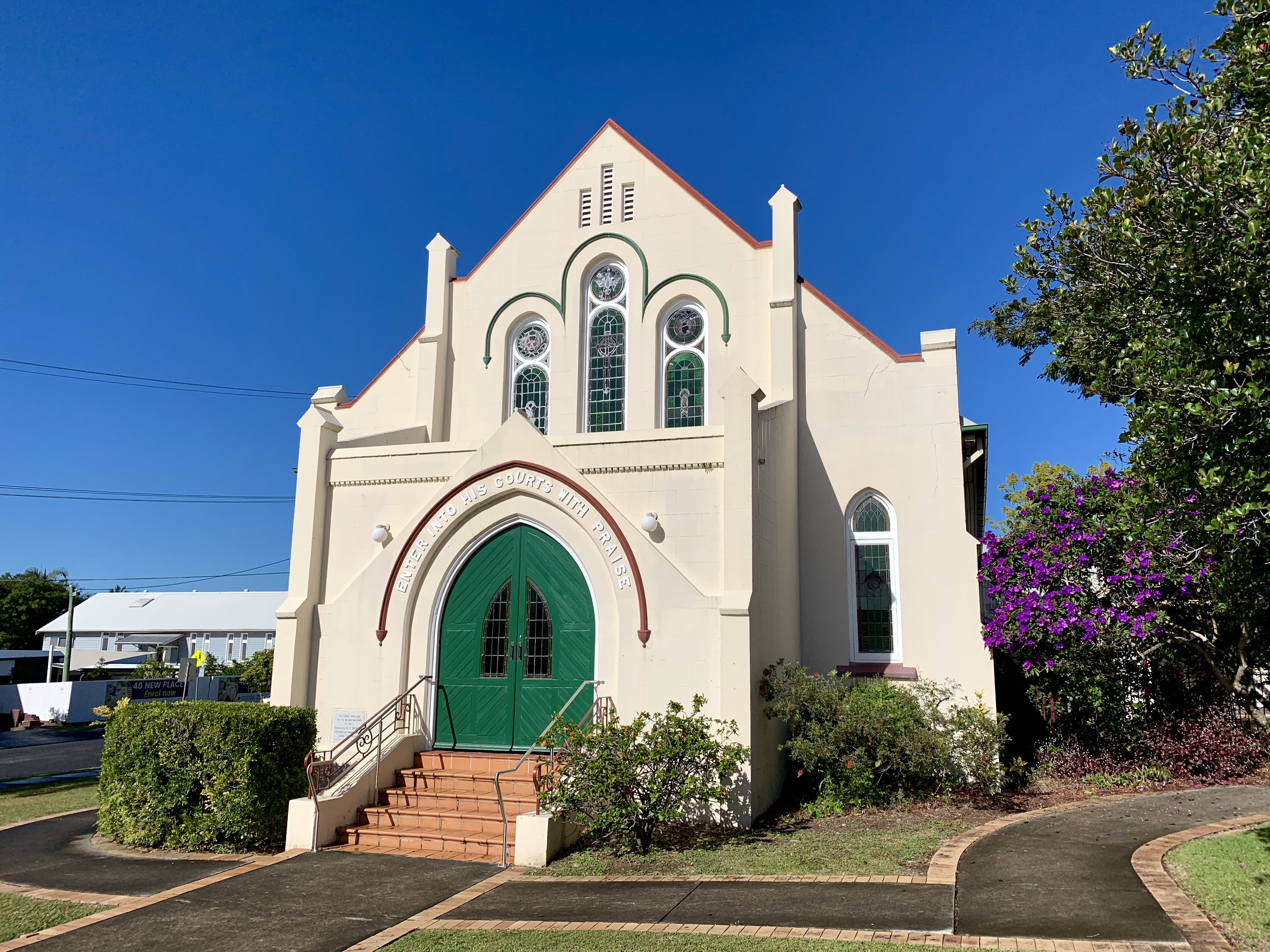
Sherwood Uniting Church, 706 Sherwood Road, 2019

Sherwood Methodist Church was built in 1914. It was designed by Walter Taylor and built from concrete. Following the amalgamation that created the Uniting Church in Australia in 1977, it became known as Sherwood Uniting Church. A Sunday School hall was opened on Saturday 29 June 1918.

On Saturday 17 March 1928, Herbert Hoare in conjunction with auctioneer Norman C. Cossart offered 8 suburban sites in the Sherwood Station Estate, which was bounded by Dewar Terrace to the west, Station Street (now Marlborough Street) to the north and Honour Avenue to the east (and north of Lilly Street). The land was formerly the home of judge Pope Alexander Cooper who died in 1923.

Sherwood was badly flooded in February 1931, January 2011 and February 2022.

== Demographics ==
In the 2016 census, Sherwood had a population of 5,313 people, 52.9% female and 47.1% male. The median age of the Sherwood population was 35 years, three years below the Australian median. 71.2% of people living in Sherwood were born in Australia, similar to the national average of 66.7%. The other top responses for country of birth were England 5.0%, New Zealand 2.5%, India 1.9%, South Korea 0.9%, China (excluding SARs and Taiwan) 0.8%. 82.3% of people spoke only English at home; other languages include 1.3% Mandarin, 1.0% Korean, 0.8% Spanish, 0.7% Persian, 0.7% Hindi.

In the 2021 census, Sherwood had a population of 6,082 people.

== Heritage listings ==
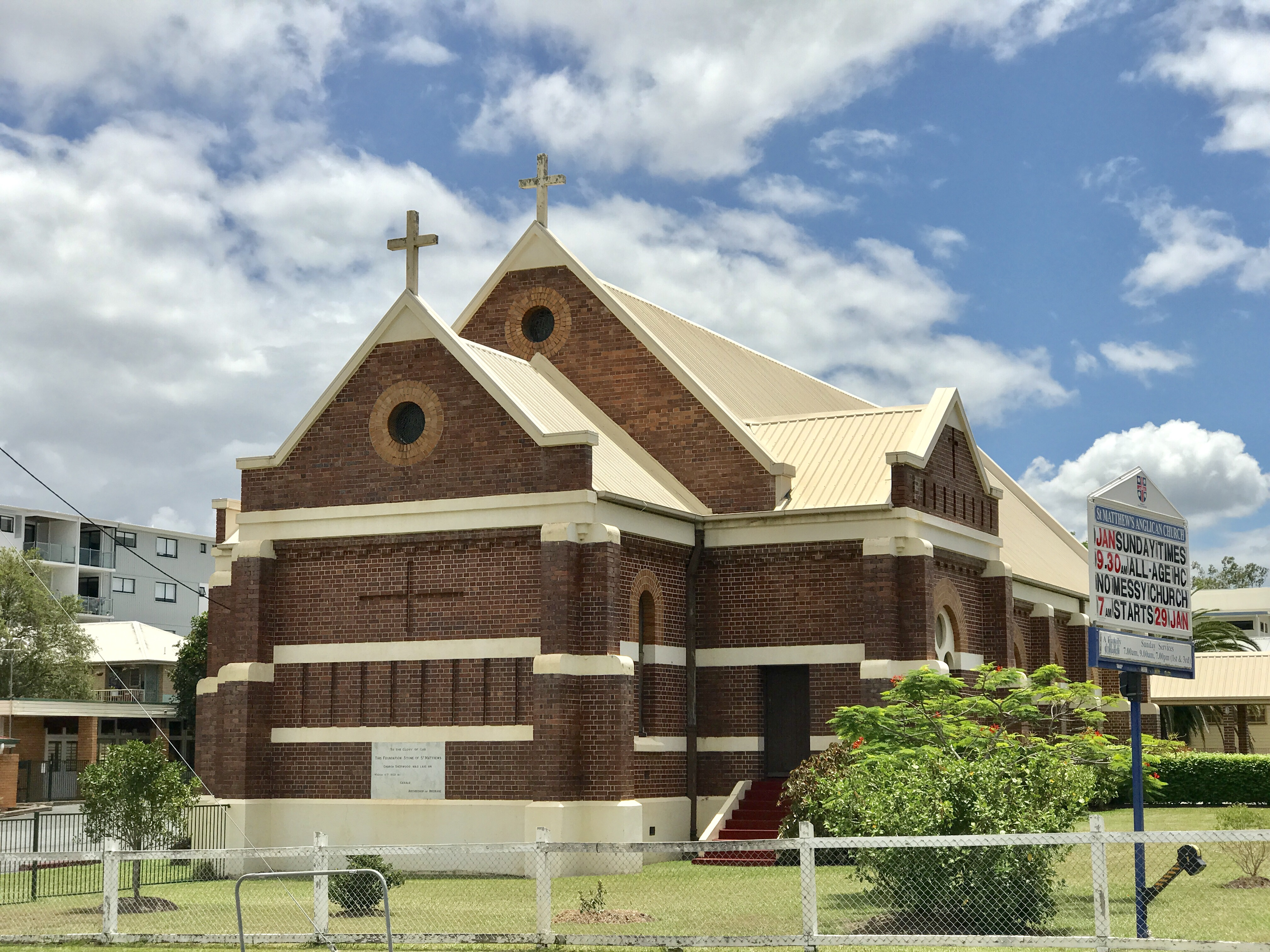
St Matthew's Anglican Church, 2016

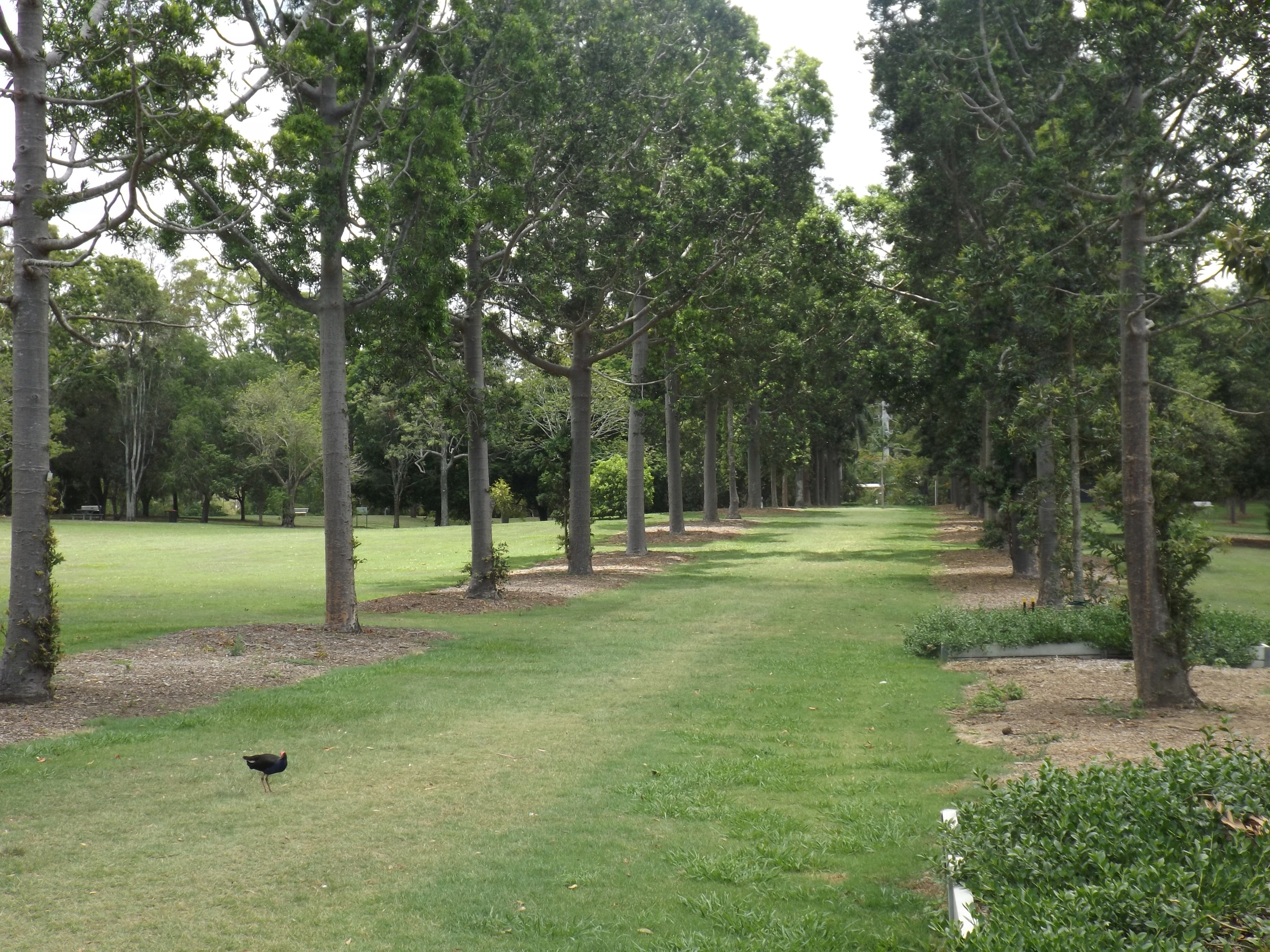
Sherwood Arboretum, 2014

Sherwood has a number of heritage-listed sites, including:

- 57 Dewar Terrace: John Herbert Memorial Vista
- 22 Ettie Street: 22 Ettie Street, Sherwood (also known as Mayfield)
- 9 Hazelmere Parade: Hazelmere
- 40 Hazelmere Parade: 40 Hazelmere Parade Sherwood
- 47 Hazelmere Parade: 47 Hazelmere Parade, Sherwood (also known as The Terrace)
- 62 Kitchener Street: 62 Kitchener Street, Sherwood
- 25 Lahey Close: Lahey's Corinda Sawmill
- 36 Lilly Street: Dunalister (also known as Sherwood Private Hospital)
- 56 Lilly Street: 56 Lilly Street, Sherwood (also known as Benaraby)
- 31 Linda Street: 31 Linda Street, Sherwood
- 464 Oxley Road: Sherwood State School
- 481 Oxley Road: St Matthew's Anglican Church
- 515 Oxley Road: former Sherwood Presbyterian Church (also known as Sherwood Uniting Church)
- 526 Oxley Road: Shop & Residence
- 46 Primrose Street: Almaden
- 533 Sherwood Road: Berry & MacFarlane Monument
- 533 Sherwood Road: Sherwood Anglican Cemetery (also known as St. Matthew's Cemetery)
- 706 Sherwood Road: Sherwood Uniting Church
- 34 Thallon Street: Hives Park (includes park, scout & guide huts & kindergarten)
- 39A Turner Street: Sherwood Arboretum, a large botanical garden and lake fronting the river which was planned and landscaped in the 1920s.

== Education ==
Sherwood State School is a government primary (Prep–6) school for boys and girls at 464 Oxley Road (27.5315°S 152.9832°E). In 2018, the school had an enrolment of 586 students with 41 teachers (34 full-time equivalent) and 31 non-teaching staff (17 full-time equivalent). The school has preserved many of its historic timber buildings.

There is no secondary school in Sherwood. The nearest government secondary school is Corinda State High School in neighbouring Corinda to the south.

== Amenities ==
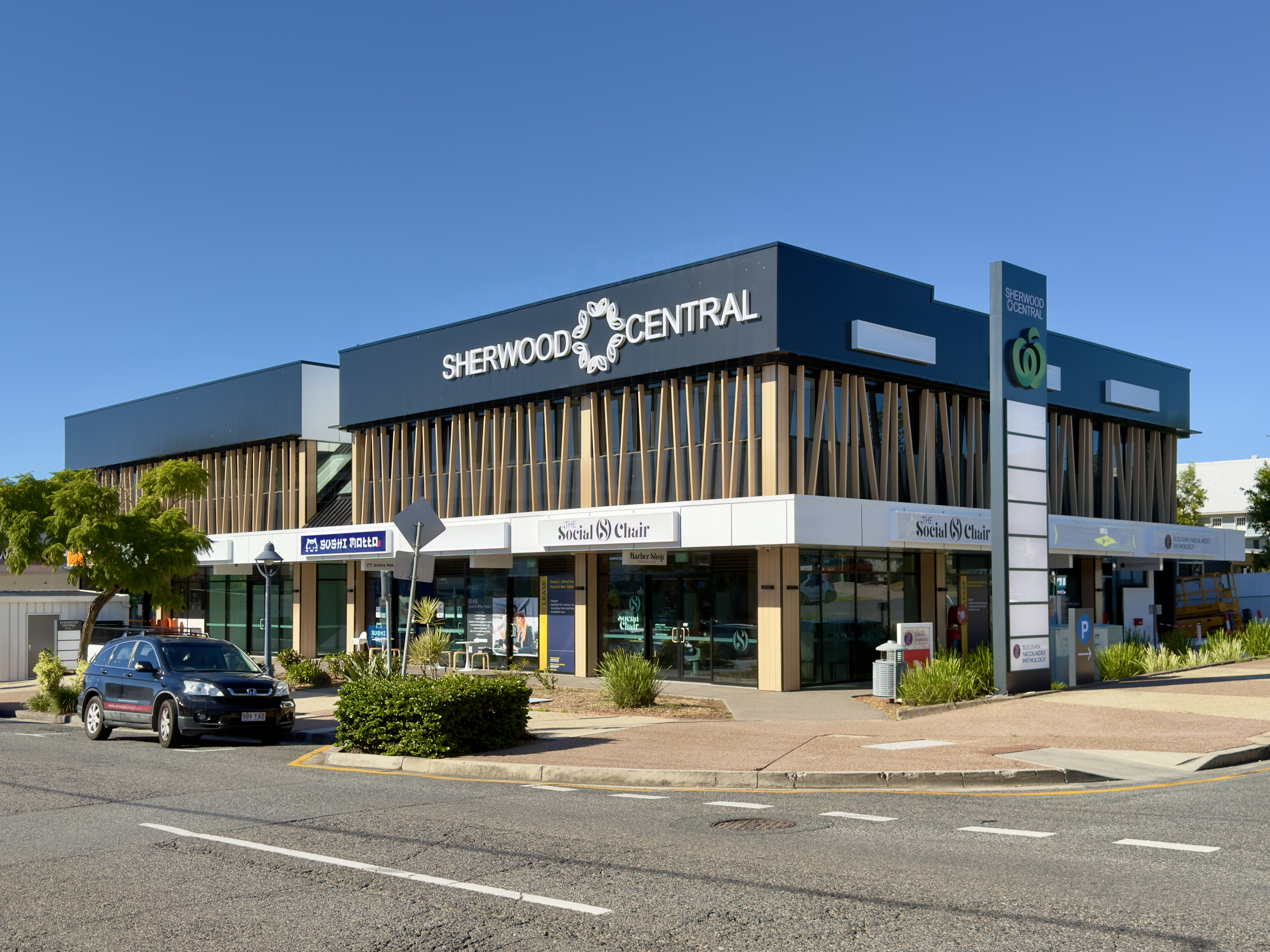
Sherwood Central shops on Sherwood Road, 2026

There are a number of churches in Sherwood, including:

- St Matthew's Anglican Church, 497 Oxley Road (corner of Sherwood Road, 27.5326°S 152.9826°E)
- Sherwood Uniting Church, 706 Sherwood Road (corner of Thallon Street, 27.5323°S 152.9803°E)
- Sherwood Methodist Church with services in English and Mandarin, 405 Oxley Road (27.5294°S 152.9826°E)
- Sherwood Romanian Seventh-day Adventist Church, 551 Sherwood Road (27.5328°S 152.9867°E)

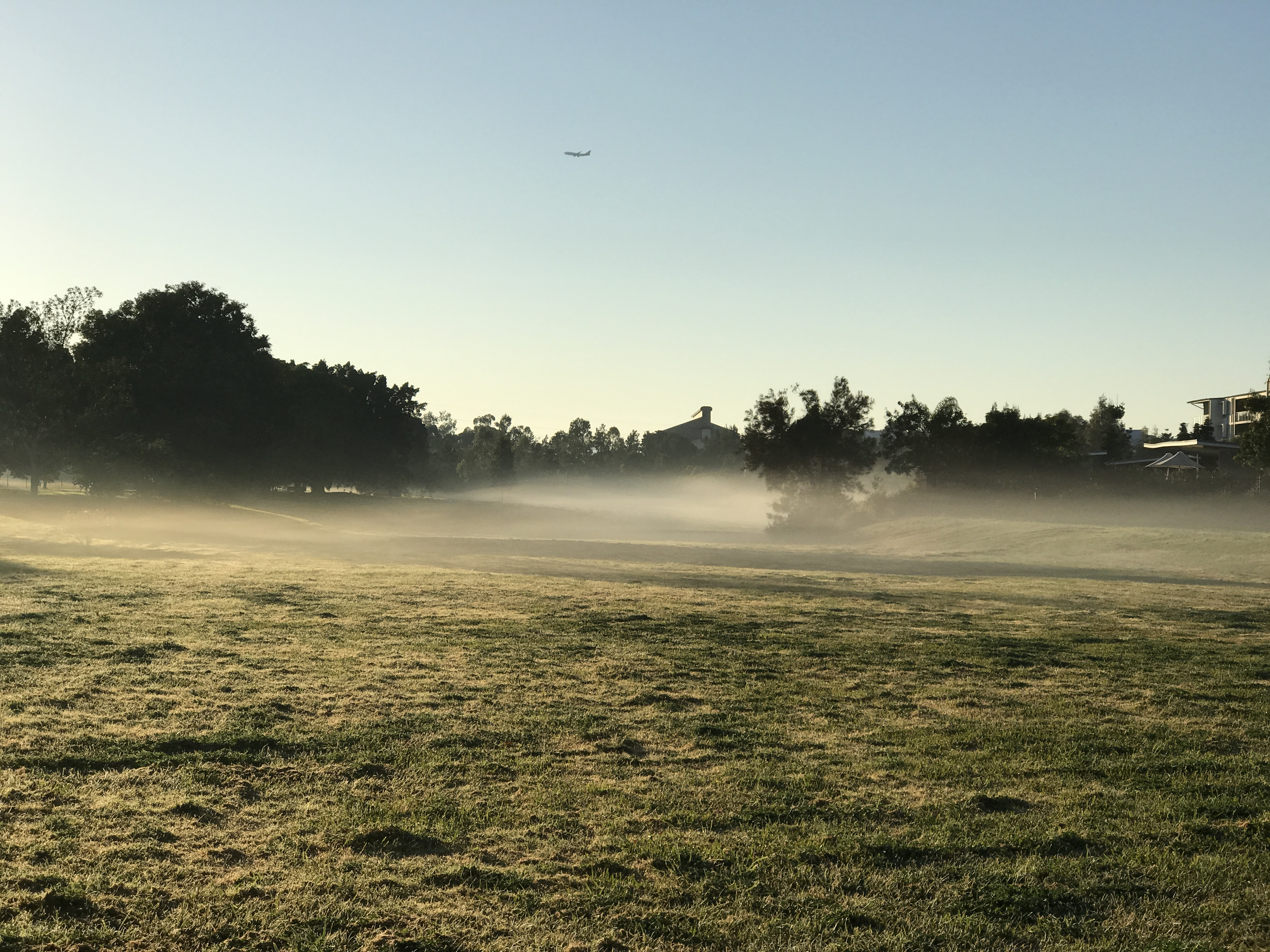
Morning fog at Thomas Street Park, 2017

Sherwood contains a few parks in different parts of the suburb. The Sherwood Arboretum is on the western side of the suburb, bordering the Brisbane River. Hives park borders the Ipswich line on the southern end of the suburb, and contains a Girl Guides building. Thomas Street Park and Strickland Terrace Park is on the eastern end of the suburb, bordering the Oxley Creek. The Stewart Franklin Park is a small park on the southern border of the suburb, next to the Tennyson line.

The Sherwood Sharks swimming club uses the Sherwood State School Pool.

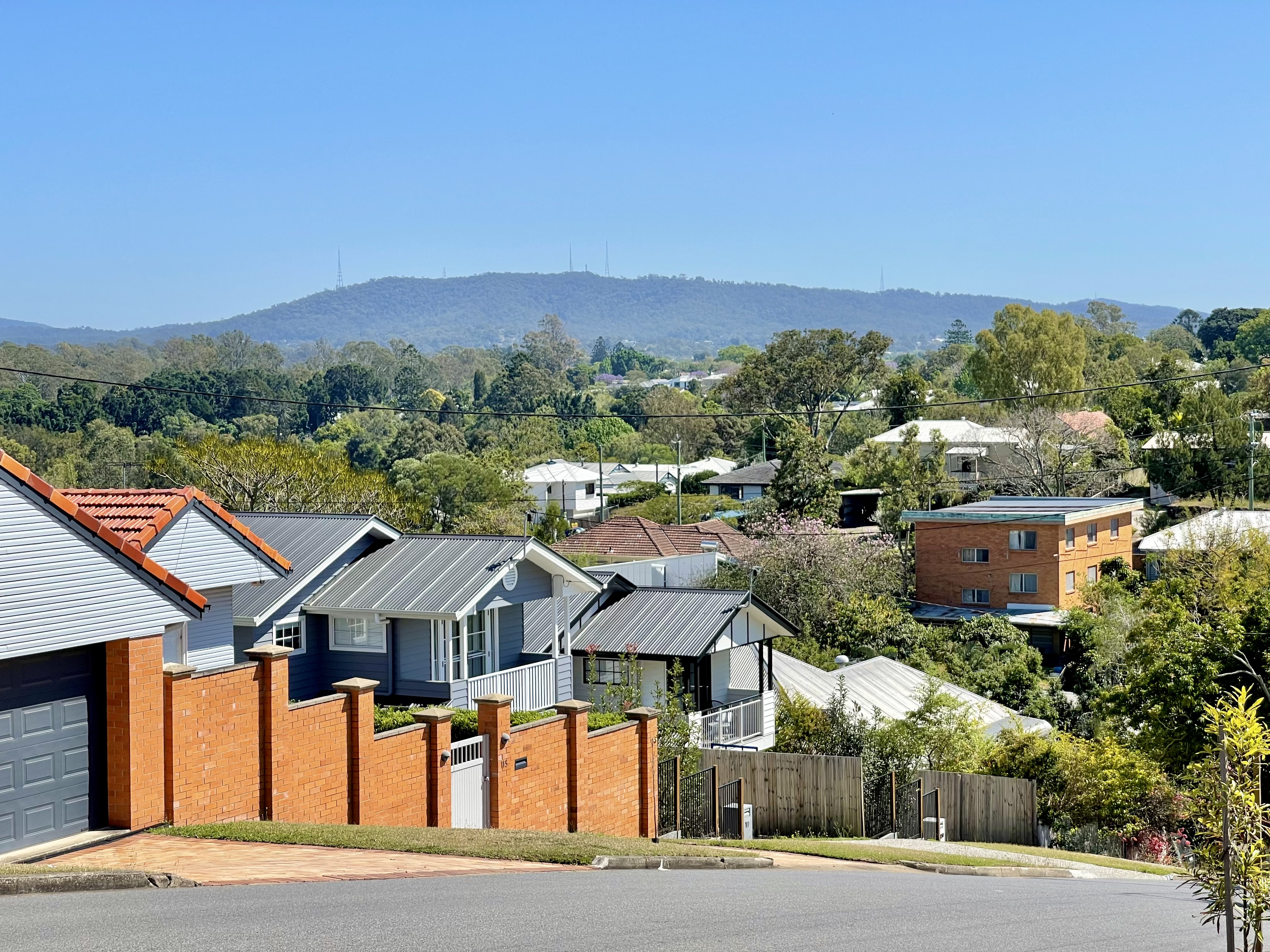
View of Mount Coot-tha from Sherwood, 2021

== Transport ==
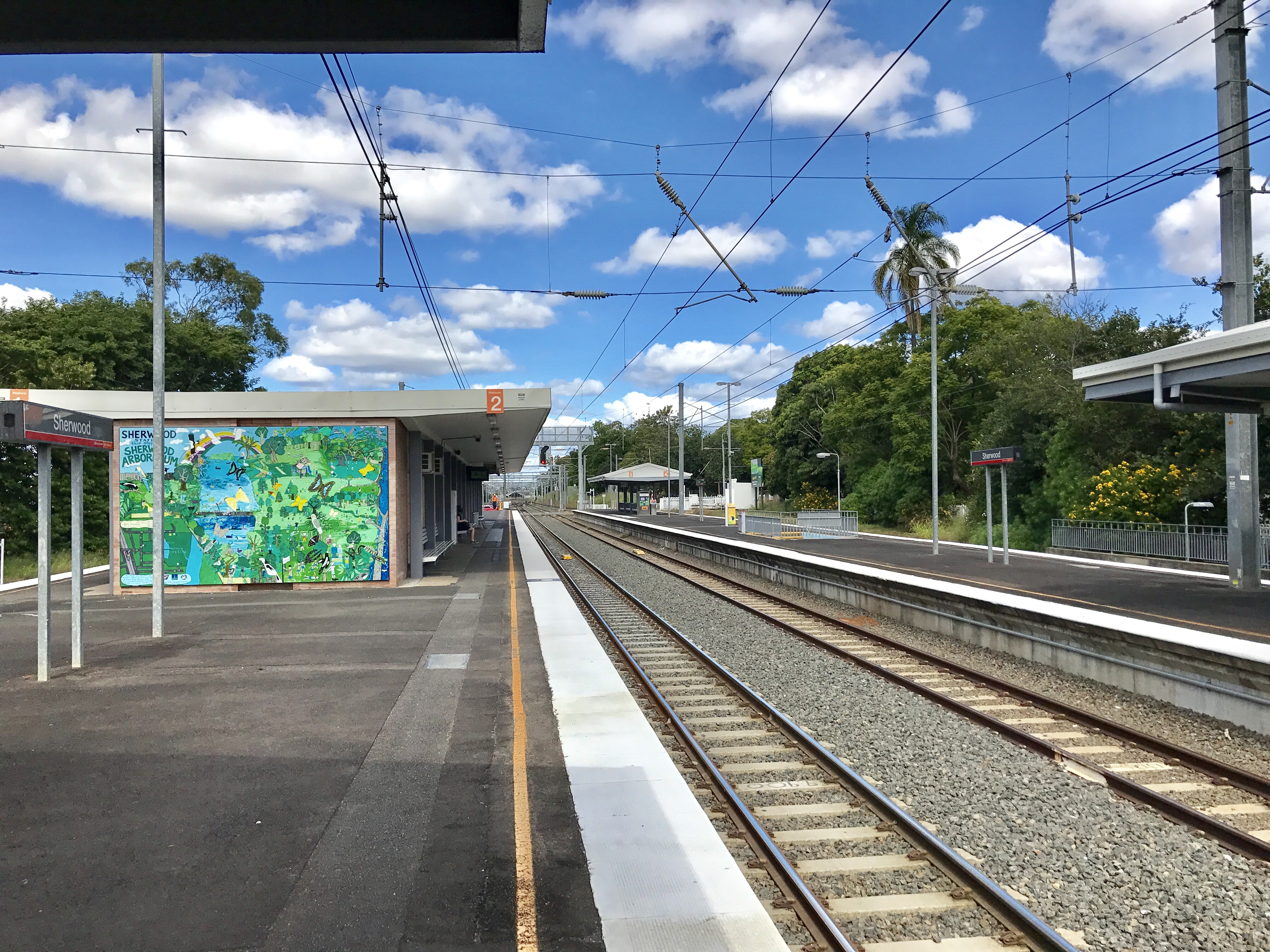
Sherwood railway station, 2017

The suburb is serviced by the Sherwood railway station which links Ipswich and the Springfield Central lines to the Brisbane central business district. Bus services along Oxley Road link the Centenary suburbs to Indooroopilly and the Great Circle Line service passes through the suburb.
