= Edward Swain =

Botanical collector and forester

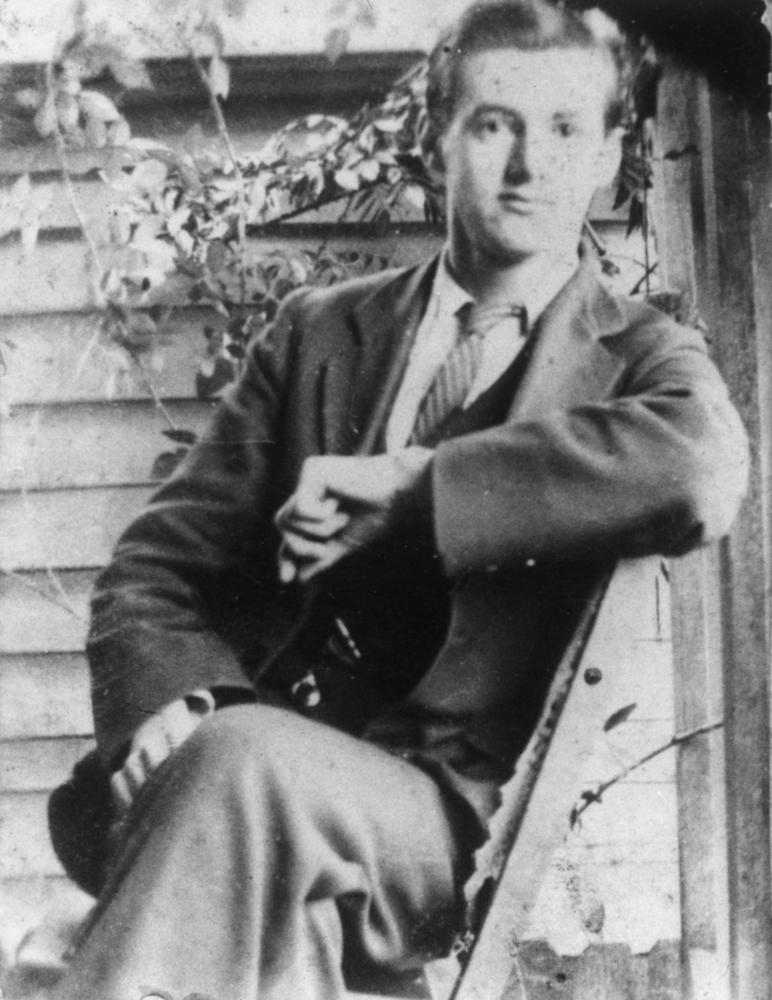
Edward Harold Fulcher Swain

Edward Harold Fulcher Swain (1883—1970) was a forester in New South Wales and Queensland, Australia. Swain laid the foundations of modern forestry economics in Queensland.

== Early life ==
Edward Harold Fulcher Swain was born in Sydney in 1883.

== Career ==
Swain was the first Cadet Forester in the New South Wales Forestry Branch in 1899. He studied forestry in Montana, USA in 1915 and on his return became a District Forest Inspector in Queensland. Between 1918 and 1924 he was Director of Forests in Queensland. During this time he set aside large tracts of hoop pine forest in the Brisbane Valley and Mary River Valley and planted areas of introduced species. On the abolition of the office of Director in 1924, he became inaugural Chairman of the Queensland Forestry Board until 1932. This Board was responsible for the management and control of the State Forests and National Parks.

Swain laid the foundations of modern forestry economics in Queensland. His new ideas and strong personality frequently brought him into conflict with others and he was often a controversial figure in an industry deeply rooted in traditional practice. Amongst other achievements, he pioneered forest assessment surveys, promoted the permanent reservation of good forests and forest land, improved pricing policies which led to a better use of timber resources and expanded staff training and the activities of his department. He wrote a number of books on forestry, was a founder of the Australian Forestry School at the Australian National University and supported community interest in trees. In 1924, he was instrumental in establishing the Sherwood Arboretum, a heritage-listed park on the Brisbane River, which is dedicated to the growth of indigenous trees.

In 1932, Swain publicly campaigned against the indiscriminate allocation of forested land as land grants, at the time a policy of the incumbent National Party Government. Although the Labor Party won the election, in the controversy and inquiries which followed Swain lost his job. He became a research consultant for Australian Paper Manufacturers in South Australia before becoming Commissioner for Forests in New South Wales until his official retirement in 1948. Between 1951 and 1955 he was United Nations Forestry Consultant in Ethiopia.

== House ==
Edward Swain purchased the 1.5 acres of riverfront land for Swain House in 1920 when he was Director of Forests in Queensland. He took out a mortgage for £1,300 and constructed a California Bungalow style home in which he was living by 1925. He surrounded the house with extensive plantings of native and exotic trees reflecting his life's work in forestry. Swain House is listed on the Queensland Heritage Register.

His daughter Nancy and her husband occupied the family home from 1946. She shared her father's interest in indigenous species and planted rainforest trees in the grounds.

The house itself reflects Swain's obsession with exploring the potential of Australian timbers. It was constructed of rosewood with the intention of proving that this timber, then not well regarded for the purpose, was suitable for building. The house also displays Queensland timbers to advantage, the joinery including panelling in pine and kauri.

== Later life ==
Swain died in Brisbane in July 1970.

== Legacy ==
Most of the trees planted by Swain and his family survive and are now large trees that make a major contribution to the landscape of the area. The Alan Fletcher Research Station of the Department of Primary Industries nearby uses the hoop pine plantation for research into forestry practices.
