= Sherwood State School =

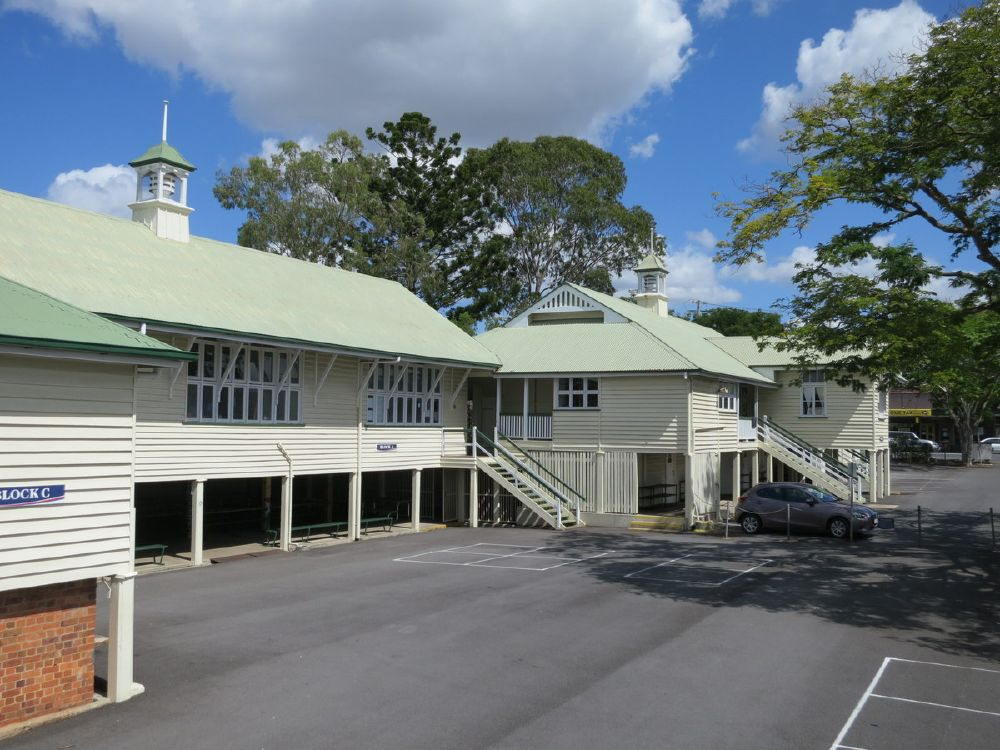
- View across parade ground from Block D to Block A (left) and Block B (right), from northeast, 2016

- Location within Queensland
- 27.5319°S 152.9842°E
- Location: 464 Oxley Road, Sherwood, City of Brisbane, Queensland, Australia

History
- Design period: 1870s–1890s (Late 19th century)
- Built: 1874–1974

Site notes
- Architect(s): Boulton & Paul Ltd, Department of Public Works (Queensland)

Queensland Heritage Register
- Official name: Sherwood State School
- Type: state heritage
- Designated: 15 July 2016
- Reference no.: 650032
- Type: Education, research, scientific facility: School-state
- Theme: Educating Queenslanders: Providing primary schooling

Sherwood State School is a heritage-listed state school at 464 Oxley Road, Sherwood, City of Brisbane, Queensland, Australia. The buildings were built from 1874 to 1974. The designers included Boulton & Paul, Ltd and the Department of Public Works (Queensland). It was formerly known as West Oxley National School. It was added to the Queensland Heritage Register on 15 July 2016.

== History ==
Sherwood State School opened in 1867, as West Oxley National School, to accommodate the growing population of a rural district on the south western outskirts of Brisbane. As enrolments grew, extensions were made and buildings added to the site. In 2016, Sherwood State School retains: a Ferguson-designed school building (1887, with 1900 extension and 1937 alterations) with a WWI memorial tablet (1919) attached; a suburban timber school building (1917); two sectional school buildings (1923 and 1937) with 1950s extensions, one a lowset pre-fabricated Boulton & Paul Building (1952); and a timber vocational building (1952). The school buildings are set amongst landscaped grounds with assembly and play areas, sporting facilities, stone-pitched terraces and mature shade trees. The school has been in continuous operation since establishment and has been a focus for the local community as a place for important social and cultural activity.

Historically part of an area known as West Oxley, which extended from Rocky Water Holes on Ipswich Road to the Brisbane River, and which was part of the traditional lands of the Turrbal and Jagera people, Sherwood was named after Sherwood Forest in England, for its heavy timber cover. Timber felling was a major early occupation in the area, which from the 1840s formed part of an extensive lease where Captain Thomas Boyland grazed cattle, sheep and horses. Following the separation of Queensland from the colony in 1859, the district was divided into 30–40 acre farms. Land use in the area shifted to cultivation, taking advantage of the fertile soils; scrub was cleared and crops planted, with produce later transported to market via nearby Oxley Creek. The mail route from Brisbane to Ipswich also passed through the area along Ipswich Road. The continued importance and development of the Darling Downs made the Ipswich Road the main route to the interior, and the initial rough track was surveyed in the 1860s. To address the education needs of the growing rural community, a national school was opened in West Oxley in March 1867.

The provision of state-administered education was important to the colonial governments of Australia. National schools, established in 1848 in New South Wales, were continued in Queensland following the colony's creation in 1859. Following the introduction of the Education Act 1860, which established the Board of General Education and began standardising curriculum, training and facilities, Queensland's national and public schools grew from four in 1860 to 230 by 1875. The State Education Act 1875 provided for free, compulsory and secular primary education and established the Department of Public Instruction. This further standardised the provision of education, and despite difficulties, achieved the remarkable feat of bringing basic literacy to most Queensland children by 1900.

The establishment of schools was considered an essential step in the development of early communities and integral to their success. Locals often donated land and labour for a school's construction and the school community contributed to maintenance and development. Schools became a community focus, a symbol of progress, and a source of pride, with enduring connections formed with past pupils, parents, and teachers. The inclusion of war memorials and community halls reinforced these connections and provided a venue for a wide range of community events in schools across Queensland.

To help ensure consistency and economy, the Queensland Government developed standard plans for its school buildings. From the 1860s until the 1960s, Queensland school buildings were predominantly timber-framed, an easy and cost-effective approach that also enabled the government to provide facilities in remote areas. Standard designs were continually refined in response to changing needs and educational philosophy and Queensland school buildings were particularly innovative in climate control, lighting, and ventilation. Standardisation produced distinctly similar schools across Queensland with complexes of typical components.

A new 45-by-18-foot (13.7 m × 5.5 m) school room, designed to accommodate 120 children, and a teacher's residence were built for the opening of the West Oxley National School, which occupied a three-acre (1.2ha) site on the corner of what are now known as Oxley and Sherwood Roads. The picturesque buildings, designed by architect Richard Suter, were sited in the southwest corner of the grounds, with a steep slope to the east leading down to a watercourse just outside the boundary. As was required for the establishment of a national school, approximately one third of the £328 building cost was raised by the local community. Attendance in the first year was reportedly 64 children.

With the arrival of the Southern and Western railways (Brisbane and Ipswich extension) as far as Oxley West in 1874, improved access led to a population increase in the area. The land surrounding the school grounds was subdivided into smaller lots, through which roads were surveyed that would later become McCulla Street and Hall Street. Enrolments at West Oxley fluctuated, from 135 in 1869, to 72 in 1873, and 160 in 1877. In May 1878 the name of the Oxley West railway station changed to Sherwood railway station, and in the same year the school became known as Sherwood State School. By 1885, enrolments at Sherwood State School had increased to 180 students and the following year events were being held at the school to raise funds for school improvements. In October 1887 a tender of £318 10s by A Byrne was accepted, and an additional classroom wing was built perpendicular to the original school building.

The new building at Sherwood State School was built to a standard design that had been introduced in 1880 and constructed across the colony until 1893. Employed by the Department of Public Instruction, Robert Ferguson was responsible for school building design between 1879 and 1885 and he was the first to give serious consideration to the ventilation of interiors. Into the low-set, timber-framed buildings Ferguson introduced a coved ceiling and vented the roof space, improving internal temperatures. The number of windows and their size was increased; however, they were few in number and sill heights were typically over 4-foot-6-inch (1.37 m) above floor level, well above eye level of students. Modestly-decorative timber roof trusses were exposed within the space. Built to this standard design, the new Ferguson-design school building at Sherwood State School was a lowset, timber-framed structure with gable roof, eastern verandah, and modest "carpenter gothic" timber detailing.

An important component of Queensland state schools was their grounds. The early and continuing commitment to play-based education, particularly in primary school, resulted in the provision of outdoor play space and sporting facilities, such as ovals and tennis courts. Also, trees and gardens were planted to shade and beautify schools. Arbor Day celebrations began in Queensland in 1890. Aesthetically designed gardens were encouraged by regional inspectors, and educators believed gardening and Arbor Days instilled in young minds the value of hard work and activity, improved classroom discipline, developed aesthetic tastes, and inspired people to stay on the land. Arbor Day plantings and associated fund raising was reported at Sherwood State School as early as 1890, and the following year, when bunyas, jacarandas, poincianas and camphor laurels were planted, it was reported that, if successful, "the school grounds will, in a few years, present a very pleasing appearance".

Sherwood, like many riverside suburbs in Brisbane, was significantly affected by the flood of 1893. The school grounds, along with surrounding residences in low-lying areas, were inundated. Despite the floods and the economic depression of the 1890s, enrolments rose through the turn of the century and the school committee advocated the urgent need to extend the school building. Tenders were sought in late 1899, and in 1900 the 1887 Ferguson-designed school building was extended at cost of £182. An image of the extended building around that time shows it had a roof fleche.

By 1914 enrolments had reached 285 students. In 1915, the existing residence, closet buildings and a playshed (built 1878) were sold and removed in 1915, and in 1916 a new playshed, with various apparatus, was built for use as a gymnasium. That year the original school building was sold and removed, and the 1887–1900 school building was remodelled, including the likely removal of the roof fleche and addition of dormer windows. Continued requests from the school committee resulted in the construction of a new three-classroom school building in 1917 that incorporated the latest in climatically responsive design.

From 1893 the Department of Public Works (DPW) greatly improved the natural ventilation and lighting of classroom interiors, experimenting with different combinations of roof ventilators, ceiling and wall vents, larger windows, dormer windows and ducting. Achieving an ideal or even adequate level of natural light in classrooms, without glare, was of critical importance to educators and consequently it became central to the design and layout of all school buildings. The years of experimentation culminated in the 1914 introduction of the suburban timber school building that solved many of the problems of light, ventilation, and classroom size that plagued previous school designs as well as provided the ideal, modern education environment.

The 1917 suburban timber school building (Block A in 2016) at Sherwood State School was a symmetrically arranged, highset and timber-framed structure with a Dutch-gable roof that featured a prominent roof fleche ventilator. The building addressed Sherwood Road and was connected to the southwest verandah corner of the 1887 Ferguson building. Block A had east, west and south-facing verandahs, and contained three 23-by-22-foot (7.0 m × 6.7 m) classrooms, separated by glazed folding partitions. Each room had a centred ceiling vent. A 12-by-14-foot (3.7 m × 4.3 m) teachers room was connected to the southern verandah, and the northern ends of the east and west verandahs had hat rooms. The northern elevation featured large banks of casement windows, with fanlights, sheltered by projecting eaves on timber brackets. The understorey had open playspace and lavatories. The estimated building cost was £1,595 and seating accommodation was provided for 150 pupils.

In December 1919 a memorial tablet, erected by the school committee in honour of past pupils who had served in World War I (WWI), was unveiled in the new school room. War memorials are a tribute to those who served, and those who died, from a particular community. They are an important element of Queensland's towns and cities and are also important in demonstrating a common pattern of commemoration across Queensland and Australia.

After WWI, the Sherwood district continued to grow, as did Sherwood State School. In 1920 the school grounds were extended by one acre (0.40 hectares) to the east, and by 1922 enrolments had risen to 661. Between 1923 and 1937 two sectional school buildings were added, to address further increases in attendance. The new school buildings were connected to the northwest (1923) and northeast (1937) corners of Block A.

Attention to improving light and ventilation to achieve an optimum classroom had culminated in 1920 with the sectional school, a high-set timber structure. This fundamentally new design combined all the best features of previous types and implemented theories of an ideal education environment. It proved very successful and was used unaltered until 1950. This type was practical, economical, and satisfied educational requirements and climatic needs. Most importantly, it allowed for the orderly expansion of schools over time.

Before the sectional school, solar orientation was not given prominence and all school buildings were orientated in relation to the street and property boundaries, often resulting in poorly orientated buildings. The sectional school type had only one verandah, typically on the northern side, allowing the southern wall, with a maximum number of windows, to be unobstructed. The building was designed so that the blank western wall was removable. As the school grew, the western end wall could be detached and the building extended in sections, hence the name. This led to the construction of long narrow buildings of many classrooms - a distinctive feature of Queensland schools.

Plans for the first sectional school building (Block B in 2016) at Sherwood show it was a highset, timber-framed structure, similar in appearance to Block A but with a north-facing verandah. Another east-facing verandah connected with the northwest corner of Block A. The new building contained three 20-by-20-foot (6.1 m × 6.1 m) classrooms, separated by fixed partitions, and had a 12-by-14-foot (3.7 m × 4.3 m) teachers room connected to the 8-foot (2.4 m) wide north-facing verandah. Hat room enclosures were located at the northeast and northwest verandah corners. The Dutch-gable roof featured a prominent ventilation fleche, and each classroom had a centred ceiling vent and a large bank of casement windows, with fanlights, on the southern wall. The open understorey had a floor of paved "concrete slabs" with perimeter drains, and was partially enclosed with timber battens. Completed in 1923, the estimated construction cost of the building was £1,886, with dual desks for 144 pupils.

The second sectional school building (Block C in 2016) was officially opened in July 1937, 70 years after the establishment of the school, and it was noted by Mr T Nimmo, MLA, that Sherwood State School was "now an ornament and show place of the district". The highset timber-framed structure was similar in design to Block B, with prominent roof fleche and north-facing verandah that had a teachers room attached. Connected to the northeast corner of Block A, the roof was Dutch-gabled at the western end and gabled at the eastern end (possibly to enable easier extension). It contained three 21-by-18-foot (6.4 m × 5.5 m) classrooms, separated by fixed partitions with centred doors, and had banks of south-facing casements with fanlights. The partitions and verandah walls were clad with a single-skin of vertical boards. In response to the sloping site, Block C was set slightly lower than Block A, to which it was connected by a verandah with steps.

To accommodate the construction of Block C, the 1887–1900 Ferguson-designed school building (Block D in 2016) was relocated to the north and remodelled for use as an infants' wing. New steps were built to access the western verandah and a new partition was built between the larger (southern) and smaller (northern) classrooms. Alterations were also made to the verandah windows of Blocks A and B, with sashes added below existing and new fanlights. The authorised cost for the works was £1,475.

With the school buildings occupying the elevated western side of the school grounds, efforts were made to provide sporting facilities and improve the drainage of the flood-prone eastern grounds. In 1930, the city council decided to replace the open drain that traversed the eastern end of the site with a pipe drain, with the Department of Public Instruction contributing £250 towards the cost. A large embankment was formed to the east of the school buildings in 1931, along which the stone-pitched terraces were also reportedly constructed during the Great Depression. In 1933 the school grounds were extended by a further three acres (1.2 hectares) to the north, which included a concentration of large eucalypt trees, resulting in the current seven acres (2.8 hectares) site. Between 1932 and 1935 the tennis courts to the north of Block B were renovated (officially opened September 1932), and the playing area and sports oval to the east were extended and levelled. At the opening of Block C in 1937, it was noted that "when the ground improvements were completed [Sherwood] would have one of the finest sporting grounds in the metropolitan area". The school committee and labour under the Unemployment Relief Scheme were responsible for much of the ground improvement works.

The Great Depression, commencing in 1929 and extending well into the 1930s, caused a dramatic reduction of building work in Queensland and brought private building work to a standstill. In response, the Queensland Government provided relief work for unemployed Queenslanders, and also embarked on an ambitious and important building program to provide impetus to the economy.

Even before the October 1929 stock market crash, the Queensland Government initiated an Unemployment Relief Scheme, through a work program by the DPW. This included painting and repairs to school buildings. By mid-1930 men were undertaking grounds improvement works to schools under the scheme. Extensive funding was given for improvements to school grounds, including fencing and levelling ground for play areas, involving terracing and retaining walls. This work created many large school ovals, which prior to this period were mostly cleared of trees but not landscaped. These play areas became a standard inclusion within Queensland state schools and a characteristic element.

Like many Queensland state schools, Sherwood was affected by the outbreak of World War II (WWII). Due to fears of a Japanese invasion, the Queensland Government closed all coastal state schools in January 1942, and although most schools reopened on 2 March 1942, student attendance was optional until the war ended. The closed schools were sometimes occupied for defence purposes, and some schools remained closed "for special reasons" after the rest had reopened. Slit trenches, to protect students from Japanese air raids, were also dug at Queensland state schools, often by parents and staff. At Sherwood State School trenches were dug to the northeast of the tennis courts (near the location of the current Administration Block G). A First Aid and Ambulance Post was also established under the school building - at first sand bagged but later bricked in (under Block C).

The post-WWII period was a time of enormous population growth Australia-wide and was accompanied by a shortage of building materials. The Department of Public Instruction was largely unprepared for the enormous demand for state education that began in the late 1940s and continued well into the 1960s. This was a nationwide occurrence resulting from immigration and the unprecedented population growth now termed the "baby boom". Queensland schools were overcrowded and, to cope, many new buildings were constructed and existing buildings were extended.

After WWII the overriding concern for the Department of Public Instruction was the need to erect school buildings as expeditiously and economically as possible. Queensland schools were faced with enormous overcrowding and a lack of resources. However, the Queensland Government and community saw education as a low priority and provided the department with only a small budget. Also, educationalists rejected the previous designs of school buildings, considering them outdated, and favoured "lighter, loosely grouped, flexible" buildings.

At Sherwood State School, additional classrooms were required to accommodate the growth in pupil numbers - from 519 in 1945 to 856 in 1955. In 1951 a 24-by-21-foot (7.3 m × 6.4 m) classroom was added to the eastern end of Block C. Plans for the new classroom show it was formed in the sectional school manner by moving the gable end wall and inserting a single-skin partition, with centred double-leaf door, between the existing and new classrooms. The southern wall had casement windows, with fanlights, and the north-facing verandah was extended, with the hat room relocated to the new eastern end. Double-hung sash windows were installed in both the new and existing verandah walls.

Plans for a new domestic science and manual training building were drawn in 1951. Previously children caught the train to Milton State School one day per week to learn these skills. Vocational education was a Queensland Government priority to support the development of primary industries; this evolved after WWI into a variety of subjects. Vocational training within primary education began in 1895 with drawing classes and expanded to include domestic sciences, agriculture, and sheet metal and wood working classes. The subjects required a variety of purpose-built facilities and were initially gender segregated.

The Queensland Government continued its focus on vocational education during the 1950s and 1960s. New vocational centres were opened at East Brisbane State School and Sherwood State School in 1952, with one also planned for Eagle Junction. Manual arts and domestic science classes were generally conducted in prefabricated Boulton & Paul buildings in the early 1950s, and in 1954 the DPW introduced a new standard design for a timber-framed vocational training building. Highset with a verandah along one side, this design comprised a large 21-by-32-foot (6.4 by 9.8 m) room accommodating either manual training or domestic science classes, with smaller rooms opening off it for complementary purposes (e.g. a laundry room, fitting room, storage etc.). The exterior was clad with chamferboards and interior lined with hardboard sheeting. A mixture of hopper and casement windows were utilised.

The vocational training building (Block G in 2016) at Sherwood State School is not a prefabricated structure and appears to be a forerunner to the 1954 standard design. The initial layout (September 1951) was amended several times, suggesting experimentation with the plan form. The final plans (December 1951) show the building comprised a long highset structure, orientated east–west, with domestic science (east) and manual arts (west) training areas accessed by a north-facing verandah. Domestic science included large rooms for dressmaking and cookery, and smaller change and staff rooms, as well as enclosures underneath for a laundry and drying area. The change room extended to occupy the centre of the verandah. Manual arts included large rooms for sheet metal and woodwork, and smaller staff and store rooms on the verandah; timber racks were housed in a battened area underneath. The estimated cost of the building was £6,507. Interior photographs from 1955 show the walls were lined with vertical boards and the ceiling was flat sheeted with cover strips.

In 1952 a lowset timber Boulton & Paul Building was constructed at the western end of Block B. Responding to materials shortages and the pressures of the baby boom, the DPW imported a British prefabricated building system from manufacturers Boulton & Paul Ltd of Norwich. Based on an 8-foot (2.4 m) planning and construction module, the prefabricated elements in the Boulton & Paul system included wall panels, ceiling panels, roof trusses and banks of awning windows. The buildings were constructed at many schools across Queensland between 1952 and 1958.

Boulton & Paul Buildings were timber-framed and clad, had a verandah as circulation, and a gable roof. Ideally, they were orientated so the verandah faced north and the classroom faced south but were also added as extensions to existing buildings regardless of orientation. The building could be high or low-set and had extensive areas of timber-framed awning windows, providing more glazing than had ever been used in Queensland classrooms; almost the entirety of the verandah wall and the opposite classroom wall were glazed, providing excellent natural ventilation and lighting. The classrooms were 24 by 24 feet (7.3 m × 7.3 m), larger than most previous classrooms. The flexibility of the system meant that the number of classrooms constructed could vary to suit the needs of a particular school.

The lowset Boulton & Paul Building at Sherwood State School comprised a single 24 feet (7.3 m)-by-24-foot-8-inch (7.52 m) classroom and a 6-foot-6-inch (1.98 m) wide northern verandah, which had a glazed screen at the northwest corner. The floor and roof of the addition were set lower than existing Block B. The walls were constructed from prefabricated units, predominantly 4 feet (1.2 m) wide (with the exception of panels at the northwest and southwest corners), with those on the north and south sides contained large areas of windows. The western end of the existing Block B Dutch-gable roof was cut back, and the dividing wall was restumped and flat-sheeted to match the new interior. The 1952 additions cost £1,895.

In 1953 Block D was extended to the east with the addition of two 24-foot (7.3 m) square highset Boulton & Paul classrooms, with a large bank of awning windows on the south side, a verandah on the north side; and a 24-foot (7.3 m) square library underneath. The existing Block D stairs were enclosed by the northern verandah of the addition and a new staffroom to the south. In 1956 a new staff room, store and covered way were constructed between Block C and Block D; alterations to the existing Block C staff room included new windows to the east, a northern window relocated and opening infilled, and existing stairs moved slightly west to accommodate new covered way. In 1957 the understorey of the early Block C staff room was enclosed to form a health services room. Alterations to the western end of Block D in 1958 included enclosing the northern end of the eastern verandah to form a store room, widening of windows with the addition of casements (northern wall) and double-hung sashes (east and west walls).

Two highset timber-framed classroom buildings were also built to the north and west of Block D in the 1950s: Block E (north, aligned east–west) was constructed in phases between 1954 and 1956, and connected to Block D by a covered way; and Block F (west, aligned north–south) was constructed in 1957, and extended in 1958.

Following a peak of 1034 students in 1959, enrolments declined through the 1970s due to demographic change in the area. Over the course of the school's history, buildings have been added, removed and altered, and changes made to the grounds to meet the school's requirements.

In 1959 the existing stone-pitched terraces were built up, with new kerb and channel above. A tuckshop was built and officially opened in March 1962. In 1964 one acre (0.4ha) of land was purchased on the opposite side of McCulla Street, and a swimming pool was constructed and opened there in 1967, the school's centenary year. The school grounds were once again inundated by floods in January 1974, with the ovals submerged and water reaching halfway up the posts supporting Block G, where a painted mark reportedly indicates the flood level. In 1985 a new concrete retaining wall was built along Sherwood Road, and in 1990 Hall Street was widened and a new ramp and access path built.

The timber vocational building (Block G) was remodelled for use by the Western Suburbs Education Centre and Sherwood Special Education Unit in 1976. Changes to the western half of the building included: western steps removed and new steel stairs added to northern side; northwest verandah corner converted to waiting room, with partitions and windows added and replaced; new doorway entrance with steps and landing added to the southwest corner; woodwork area reconfigured for use as a remedial classroom, store/prep room and remedial room; sheet metal area reconfigured for use as a therapy classroom, wet area, and resource teacher room in the northwest corner; and new door and tempered hardwood panels added to verandah wall.

In 1991–92 Block G was again remodelled for use as an administration (western half) and classroom (eastern half) block. The administration section contained the reception and waiting area, Principal's office, staff room, therapy classroom and adjacent wet area, and staff toilets in the former northwest waiting room. In the eastern half, the former dressmaking and cookery classrooms were converted to an open-plan teaching area with verandah walls removed and verandah enclosed with new awning windows above benches / sinks, and the former change room reconfigured as a withdrawal area. Interior walls were lined with plasterboard.

Blocks A, B, C and D were also remodelled through the 1980s (Block C) and 1990s, when enrolment numbers once again rose. The suburban timber school building (Block A) classroom layout was reconfigured, with existing folding partitions removed (bulkheads retained) and concertina doors installed to form a narrow central classroom / amenity space with large classrooms either side. A section of the southern verandah wall was removed and sides enclosed, to connect the central classroom with the projecting teachers room. The southern windows have also been replaced with aluminium-framed sliders, with the wall below flat-sheeted.

The sectional school buildings (Blocks B and C) both had verandahs partly enclosed, and partitions partly or fully removed to create open-plan teaching areas. Block B had its southern windows replaced with aluminium-framed sliders, classroom layout reconfigured to two rooms, verandah doors and windows replaced, verandah corners enclosed and new openings formed to create amenity spaces off the classrooms. Block C was converted for use as a computer room and open-plan library, including: enclosure of the eastern half of the northern verandah; demolition of the former verandah walls; and large openings formed in the classroom partitions. The roof fleche has also been removed.

The Ferguson-designed school building (Block D, western section) had its dividing classroom partition demolished and rebuilt to the south, and openings formed in the eastern verandah wall onto kitchenette / amenity areas. The 1953 Boulton & Paul classrooms (Block D, eastern section) have been considerably altered with the verandah enclosed with aluminium framed windows, folding classroom partitions removed, large openings formed in the former verandah walls and the enclosed stairs removed.

Recent additions at Sherwood State School include the construction of a new Activities Hall (c. 2000), classroom Blocks I, J and K to the north and east of Block G, and a Multi-purpose Hall and Music Block (2010) built over the stone-pitched retaining terraces and stairs. Other landscape features still visible at the Sherwood State School include numerous mature trees: a hoop pine, eucalypts and leopard trees on the corner of Sherwood Road and Oxley Road; a leopard tree in the parade ground; jacarandas, poinciana and eucalypts along the Sherwood Road boundary of the playing fields; and a grove of eucalypts to the north of the school buildings.

In 2016, the Sherwood State School continues to operate from its original site. The school is important to the area as a focus for the community, and generations of students have been taught there. Since establishment, Sherwood State School has been a key social focus for its community with the grounds and buildings having been the location of many social events.

== Description ==
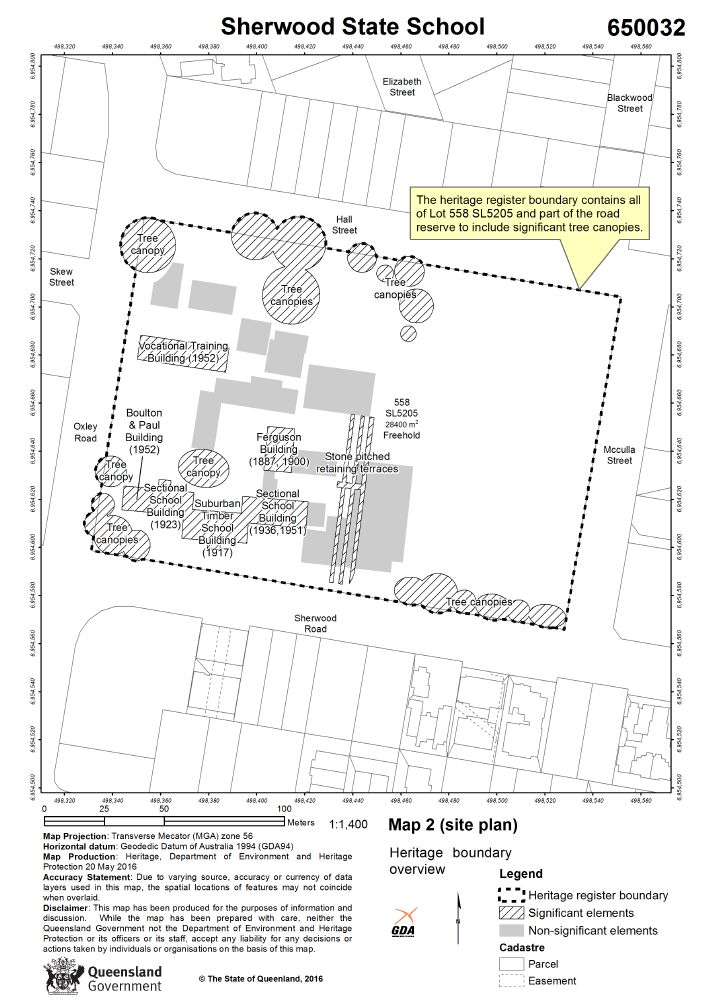
Site plan, 2016

Sherwood State School occupies a 7ha site within Sherwood, a residential suburb approximately 8 kilometres (5.0 mi) southwest of the Brisbane CBD. The school is located on the corner of Sherwood Road (south) and Oxley Road (west), and is bounded to the north by Hall Street and to the east by McCulla Street. School buildings occupy the elevated western half of the site, with a playing field to the east, separated by stone-pitched retaining terraces. The culturally-significant buildings, from south to north, include:

- a suburban timber school building (Block A, 1917) facing Sherwood Road
- two sectional school buildings (Block B, 1923; and Block C, 1937 with 1951 extension) either side of Block A, linked by verandahs
- a Boulton & Paul Building (Block B, 1952 extension);
- a Ferguson-designed school building (Block D; 1887, extended 1900, relocated and altered 1937)
- a timber vocational building (Block G; 1952)

The school grounds contain a number of significant mature trees, and landscaping features include earthworks, assembly and play areas, sporting facilities, and paths. With its decorative timber school buildings facing Sherwood Road, the school makes an important visual contribution to the streetscape and is a landmark for the area.

=== Suburban timber school building (Block A) ===
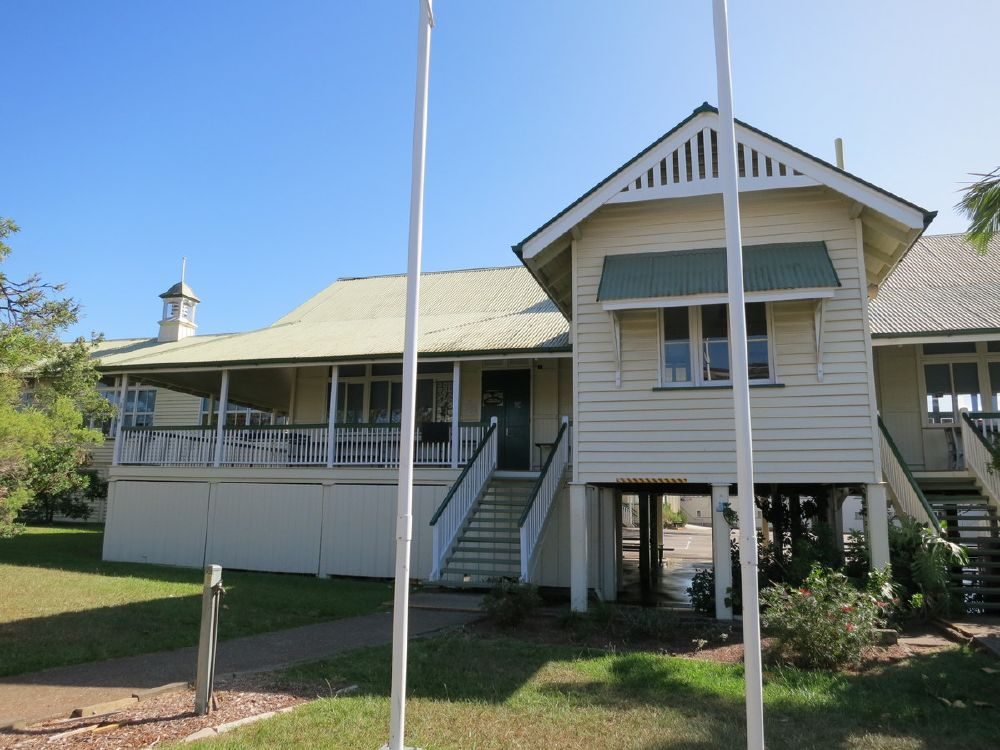
View from Sherwood Road to Block A (centre) and Block B (left), from south, 2016

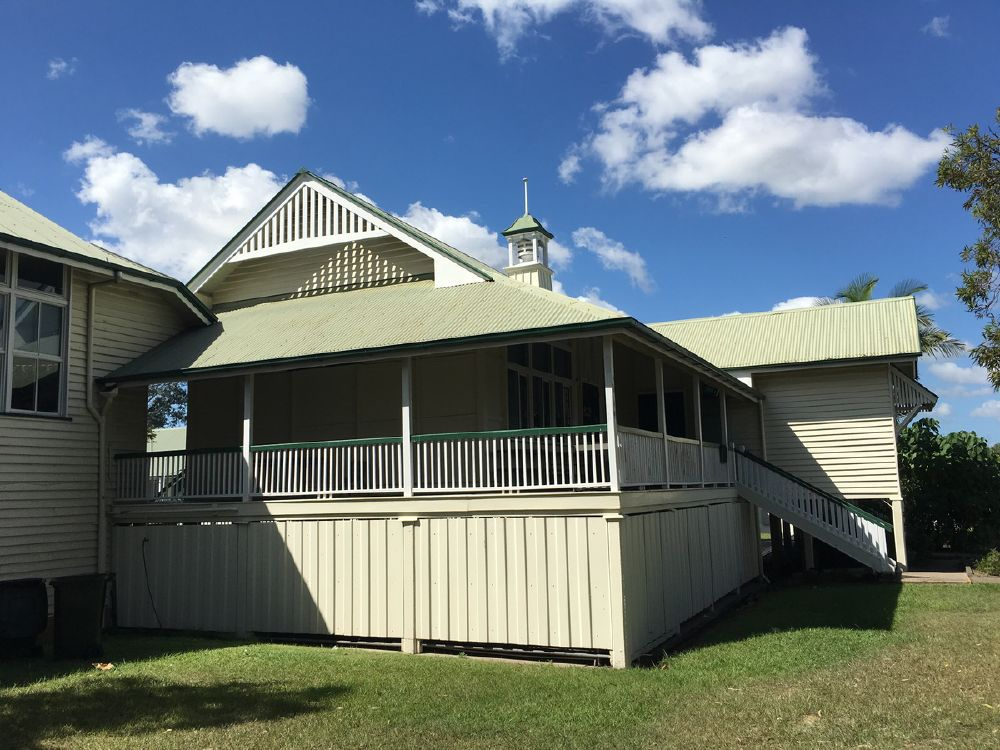
View to Block A, from southwest, 2016

Block A is a symmetrically arranged, highset, timber-framed building, orientated east–west, with east, west and south-facing verandahs. It contains three classrooms. The Dutch-gabled roof is sheeted with corrugated metal, and features a prominent ventilation roof fleche and battened gable infills. A gable-roofed teachers room is attached to the southern verandah and flanked by timber stairs.

The exterior is clad in timber weatherboards and the verandah walls are lined with a single skin of V-jointed (VJ), tongue-and-groove (T&G) boards. The northern wall has banks of windows, which are recently installed aluminium-framed sliders, sheltered by wide eaves supported by timber brackets. There are high-level pivot windows on the eastern and western walls, and the southern wall has three large banks of casement windows with pivot fanlights and louvres above. The teachers room has casement windows to the east and the south (with battened skillion hood). The verandahs have timber floors, flat-sheeted raked ceilings, and two-rail balustrades that are battened. Verandah steps connect Block A with Block B to the northwest and Block C to the northeast.

The interior layout comprises two large classrooms with a central narrow classroom / amenity area (formerly three equal classrooms), separated by modern concertina doors. Part of the verandah has been enclosed, and the verandah wall removed, to connect the central area with the teachers room. The classroom interior is lined with VJ boards and retain bulkheads that demonstrate the former layout. Former ventilations flaps are evident at the base of the verandah walls. The classroom and teachers room ceilings are coved and lined with VJ boards, and retain centred metal tie rods and vent frames; the teachers room vent is latticed. The timber floors are covered with modern carpet and other floor linings.

The understorey has a concrete floor and comprises mostly open play space. The concrete stumps have chamfered corners, and the southern and eastern sides are enclosed with modern crimped sheeting.

=== Sectional school buildings (Block B and Block C) ===
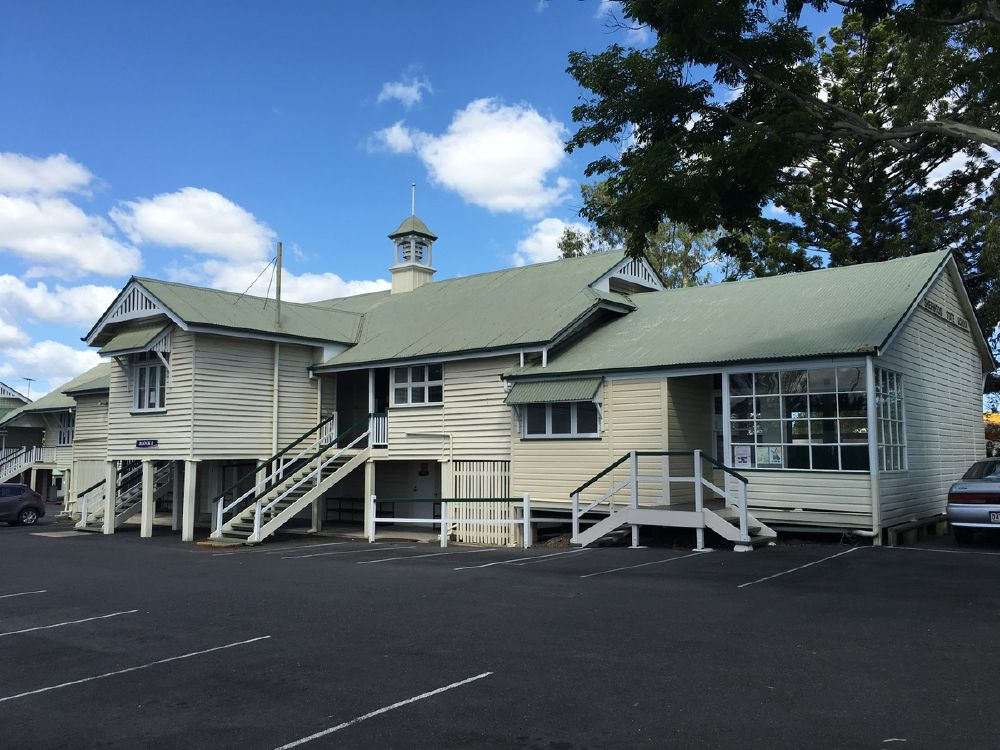
View to Block B, projecting teachers room and Boulton & Paul extension (right), from northwest, 2016

The sectional school buildings are both highset, timber-framed structures, aligned east–west, with partially enclosed verandahs along the northern side, large banks of windows along the southern side, and blank end walls. The Dutch-gabled and gabled (eastern end of Block C) roofs are clad with corrugated metal and have battened gable infills; Block B features a prominent ventilation roof fleche. Both have gable-roofed teachers rooms projecting north from the verandahs, flanked by timber stairs.

The buildings are clad externally in weatherboards, and the verandah walls and raked ceilings are lined with a single-skin of VJ T&G boards. The walls and flat ceilings of the classrooms and teachers room are lined with VJ T&G boards; the ceiling of the western classroom in Block B is flat-sheeted. Square ceiling vent frames, centred on the former classrooms and banks of southern windows, demonstrate the earlier layouts.

==== Block B – 1923 ====
The 1923 building contains two large classrooms (formerly three) separated by a fixed partition. Openings in the former verandah walls connect the classrooms with kitchenettes / amenity areas in the enclosed verandah corners. Steps in the eastern verandah connect with the western verandah of Block A.

The southern classroom wall has three large banks of windows, which along with those in the verandah wall have been replaced with aluminium-framed sliders and hoppers. The teachers room has timber-framed casement windows on the east and northern sides; the northern being sheltered by a skillion hood with battened timber brackets. The teachers room door is panelled and the boarded classroom double-doors have fanlights.

The enclosed understorey is clad with a combination of timber battens, weatherboards and flat-sheeting, and contains a number of storage rooms. Concrete paving is visible at the western end.

==== Block C – 1937 and 1951 ====
The 1937 building contains a computer room and a two-room open-plan library (formerly three classrooms), and the 1951 classroom to the east is connected by a large opening in the former dividing partition. The eastern half of the northern verandah is enclosed with double-hung sashes and large openings have been formed in the former verandah walls. Bulkheads remain, indicating the early partition layout. The open western verandah connects via steps with the eastern verandah of Block A; it has a battened balustrade and a hat room in the northwest corner.

The southern classroom wall has four large banks of casement windows (1937, 2-light; 1951, 3-light) with fanlights, sheltered by a wide eave supported by timber brackets. The remaining verandah windows are double-hung sashes, with fanlights. The 1937 teachers room has casement windows, with fanlights on the eastern side, and double-hung sashes to the west.

The classroom understorey is enclosed with face brick walls, set back from the perimeter posts, and contains workshop and storage areas. The teachers room understorey has been enclosed for use as an office.

The 1956 weatherboard-clad extension north of the 1937 teachers room, contains a staff room and computer room, connected to Block D by a verandah walkway.

==== Boulton & Paul Building (Block B – 1952 extension) ====
The 1952 prefabricated Boulton & Paul extension is attached to the western end of Block B. The single classroom building is lowset, with a floor level and roofline set lower than the 1923 classrooms. The northern verandah is accessed by timber steps and features a glazed timber screen to the northwest corner; the eastern end is enclosed.

The exterior is clad in narrow chamferboards and has vertical timber strips at 1.2-metre (3 ft 11 in) centres. A timber sign that reads "SHERWOOD STATE SCHOOL" is fixed high on the western wall. The southern wall has a large bank of hopper windows sheltered by wide eaves on metal and timber brackets, which are fixed to the window mullions. The verandah wall has a double-hung sash window, and glazed and boarded double-doors to the classroom.

The classroom walls and ceiling are sheeted; the western wall caneite, which along with the southern wall has cover strips. Awning fanlights remain above openings formed in the wall between the classroom and enclosed verandah.

=== Ferguson-designed school building (Block D) ===
The 1887 Ferguson-designed school building is highset and aligned north–south, with a verandah on its western side; the former eastern verandah has been enclosed. It is clad in chamferboards and the gabled roof features high-level gable-end vents, board-lined eaves, and east and west-facing dormer windows.

The northern and southern walls have banks of timber-framed casement and pivot windows, with modern louvred fanlights, sheltered by skillion hoods with decorative timber brackets. The western verandah wall has double-hung sash windows and panelled double-doors, all with fanlights; the balustrades are three-railed and some verandah posts are stop-chamfered.

The building contains two classrooms, separated by a fixed partition. Large openings connect the classrooms with kitchenette / amenity areas along the enclosed eastern verandah. The classrooms walls are lined with VJ T&G boards. The coved classroom ceilings and raked verandah ceilings are lined with beaded boards; a join in the northern classroom ceiling indicates the location of an earlier dividing partition and the likely point where the building was extended in 1900. The timber collar ties are stop-chamfered.

The understorey has open playspace and is enclosed on the western side with corrugated metal and flat-sheeting.

An Honour Board (1919) is mounted on the western wall of the building, listing the names of former students who served in World War I (WWI). It comprises an engraved marble board on a timber backing, and reads "SHERWOOD STATE SCHOOL – IN HONOUR OF PAST PUPILS WHO SERVED IN THE GREAT WAR. 1914–1919". A metal plaque below commemorates the schools 125th anniversary in 1992.

The 1953 Boulton & Paul extension to the east of the Ferguson building contains classrooms and an office. It is clad in chamferboards and has a large bank of hopper windows on the southern wall. The understorey is enclosed.

=== Timber vocational building (Block G – 1952) ===
The 1952 timber vocational building aligns east–west and is lowset at the western end and highset at the eastern end, reflecting the slope of the site. The long, gable-roofed building is clad in chamferboards and has a north-facing verandah, of which the eastern half is enclosed with awning windows. The southern wall has four large banks of casement windows, with fanlights, and the remaining verandah wall has double-hung sashes, with fanlights.

The building contains numerous partitioned administration rooms to the west (former manual training unit), and central office / meeting rooms and teaching areas to the east (former domestic science unit). The northwest corner of the verandah is enclosed for toilets (former hat room), and the verandah walls of the enclosed eastern half have been demolished to form open-plan classrooms. The interior walls and ceilings are flat-sheeted; an area of early narrow VJ board linings is retained in one of the central offices.

Early timber stairs are located at the eastern end, while the metal-framed stairs on the north and south sides are later replacements. The northeast corner of the understorey (former laundry and drying area) is battened and sheeted, and the northern side is enclosed with modern timber lattice.

=== Landscape Elements ===
The school grounds are well established, with sporting facilities including a generous playing field at the eastern end of the site, and school buildings positioned around a parade ground and set amongst landscaped surrounds at the elevated western end.

Between the playing fields and school buildings is a series of retaining walls and stairs that form a terraced bank. The walls are faced with stone and the terrace landings are grassed. Variations in stone sizes and appearance indicate different phases of construction, with part of the northern ends possibly removed. Extensions at the top of the walls are stencilled concrete. A Multi-purpose Hall and Music Block (2010) has been built over the stone-pitched retaining terraces and stairs.

Many mature trees are located within the school grounds, including: a hoop pine (Araucaria cunninghamii), eucalypts (Eucalyptus spp.) and leopard trees (Libidibia ferrea) on the corner of Sherwood Road and Oxley Road; a leopard tree in the parade ground; and a grove of eucalypts to the north of the school buildings. These mature trees, along with jacarandas (Jacaranda mimosifolia), poinciana (Delonix regia) and eucalypts along the Sherwood Road boundary of the playing fields, enhance the school's prominence in its location and contribute to its picturesque setting.

== Heritage listing ==
Sherwood State School was listed on the Queensland Heritage Register on 15 July 2016 having satisfied the following criteria.

The place is important in demonstrating the evolution or pattern of Queensland's history.

Sherwood State School (established in 1867 as West Oxley National School) is important in demonstrating the evolution of state education and its associated architecture in Queensland. The place retains representative examples of standard government designs that were architectural responses to prevailing government educational philosophies; set in landscaped grounds with assembly and play areas, stone-pitched terraces, sporting facilities, and mature shade trees.

The Ferguson-designed school building (1887, extended 1900) demonstrates the early integration of changes to improve the practicality and comfort of school buildings, and was an early standardised design.

The suburban timber school building (1917) demonstrates the evolution of timber school design, including experimentation with light, classroom size and elevation, by the Department of Public Works.

The two sectional school buildings (1923 and 1937) demonstrate the culmination of many years of experimental timber school design, providing equally for educational and climatic needs.

The Boulton & Paul Building (1952) demonstrates the introduction and adoption of imported prefabricated systems by the Queensland Government in response to acute building material shortages and population growth in the post-World War II period.

The timber vocational building (1952) demonstrates the incorporation of practical subjects into school curricula and the early development of post-war standardised vocational designs.

The World War I memorial tablet (1919) attached to the Ferguson-designed school building is important in demonstrating the school communities' involvement in a major world event. War memorials are a tribute to those who served, and those who died, from a particular community. They are an important element of Queensland's towns and cities and are also important in demonstrating a common pattern of commemoration across Queensland and Australia.

The large, suburban site with mature trees and landscaping features demonstrates the importance of play and aesthetics in the education of children.

The place is important in demonstrating the principal characteristics of a particular class of cultural places.

Sherwood State School is important in demonstrating the principal characteristics of Queensland state schools. These include: teaching buildings constructed to standard designs; and generous, landscaped sites with mature trees, assembly and play areas, and sporting facilities. The school is a good, intact example of a suburban school complex, comprising the following building types.

The Ferguson-designed school building retains some characteristics of its early standardised design, including: timber-framed structure with high-pitched gable roof; verandahs (eastern enclosed); decorative timberwork; gable-end windows with skillion hoods; coved ceilings with stop-chamfered timber collar ties; early internal linings; and ventilation features such as louvred gable vents.

The suburban timber school building is a good, intact example of its type, retaining its: highset timber-framed structure with play space beneath; symmetrical plan form of classrooms and verandahs; projecting teachers room; coved ceiling and metal tie rods; early internal linings; and ventilation system including remnant vents at floor level and decorative roof fleche.

Connected to the suburban timber school building by verandahs, the two sectional school buildings are good examples of their type and are externally intact. Characteristics include their: highset timber-framed structure; Dutch-gable roofs; northern verandahs; large banks of south-facing windows; blank end walls, the eastern used for classroom expansion; single-skin verandah walls; projecting teachers rooms; hat-room enclosure; and early internal linings.

The lowset Boulton & Paul Building is a good, intact example of its type, retaining its: modular, lightweight construction expressed in the external cladding; gable roof; glazed verandah screen; large areas of glazing to the southern wall; and flat internal wall linings.

The former vocational training building is an early iteration of its type and retains some external characteristics including: highset (eastern end) timber-framed structure with verandah along one side; chamferboard cladding; and banks of south-facing casement windows, with fanlights.

The place is important because of its aesthetic significance.

The well-composed timber school buildings, with their Dutch-gable rooflines, prominent roof fleches, open verandahs and projecting teachers rooms, set amongst mature trees and landscaped gardens, are an attractive feature along Sherwood Road and a landmark for the area.

The place has a strong or special association with a particular community or cultural group for social, cultural or spiritual reasons.

Schools have always played an important part in Queensland communities. They typically retain significant and enduring connections with former pupils, parents, and teachers; provide a venue for social interaction and volunteer work; and are a source of pride, symbolising local progress and aspirations.

Sherwood State School has a strong and ongoing association with the surrounding community. It was established in 1867 through the fundraising efforts of the local community and generations of children have been taught there. The place is important for its contribution to the educational development of the community and is a prominent community focal point and gathering place for social and commemorative events with widespread community support.

== Notable students ==
- Brigadier General Cecil Foott, who held several high positions in the Commonwealth Defence Department
- Richard Powell Francis (1860–1894) was the first Australian to graduate from Balliol College (Oxford University) and died after rescuing others in the 1893 Brisbane flood
- Wilfred Hall, governing, director of Hall Gibbs Mercantile Agency, Ltd., gained his scholarship in 1900. Mr. Hall is the son of Hon. T. M. Hall, M.L.C.
- Tom Kerr, Member of the Queensland Legislative Assembly
- Robert John Nosworthy, director of Burns, Philp, and Co., Ltd.
- Oliver Radcliffe, Sherwood's first pupil teacher, District Inspector for the Queensland Education Department.

== See also ==
- History of state education in Queensland
- List of schools in Greater Brisbane
