= Sherwood Arboretum =

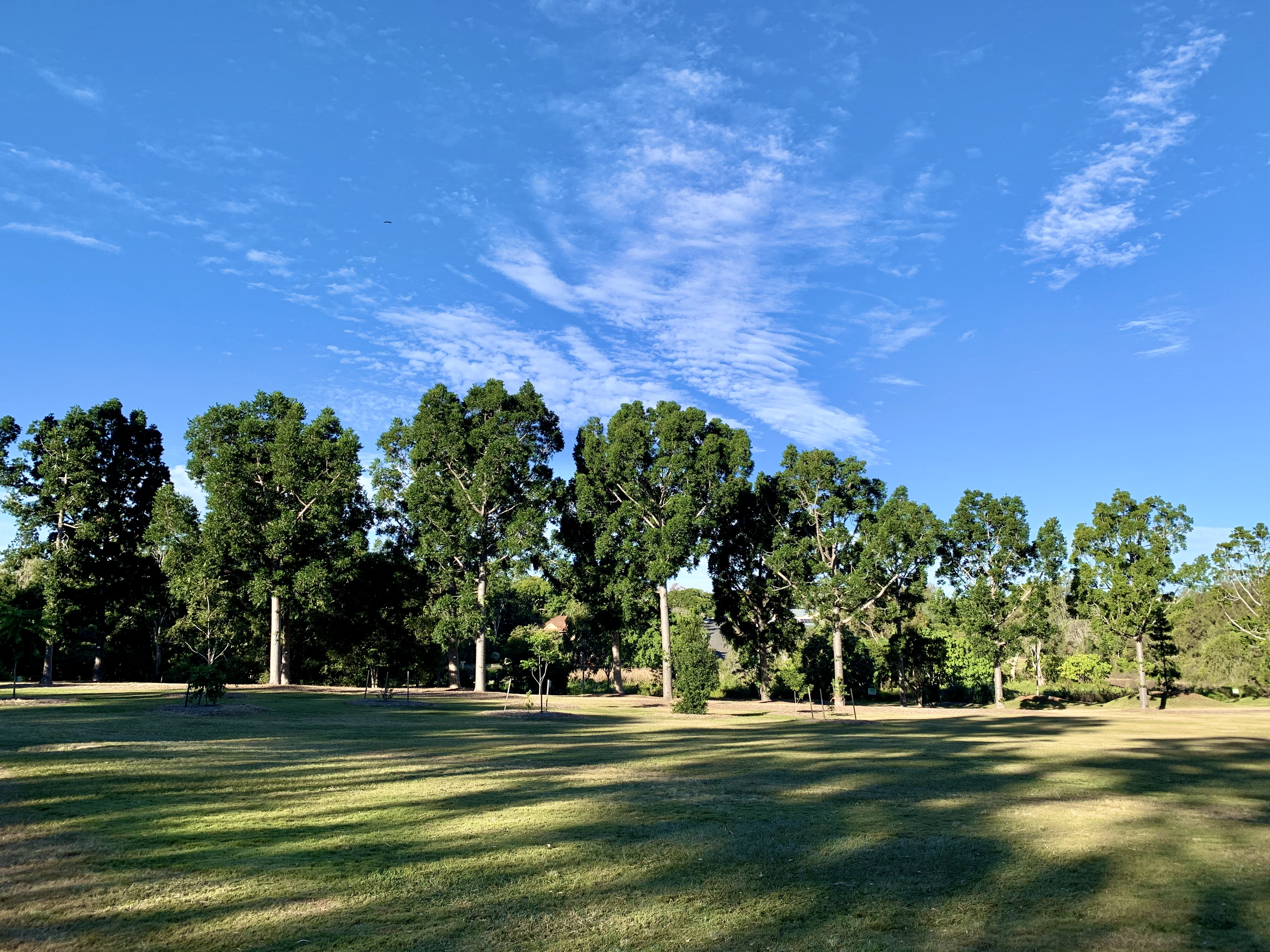
- Queensland kauri plantings along Sir Mathew Nathan Avenue, 2020

- Location within Queensland Location within Australia
- 27.5311°S 152.9745°E
- Location: 39A Turner Street, Sherwood, Queensland, Australia

Queensland Heritage Register
- Official name: Sherwood Arboretum (including the John Herbert Memorial Vista)
- Type: state heritage (landscape)
- Designated: 3 May 2007
- Reference no.: 602456
- Significant period: 1922–

External videos
- Sherwood Arboretum flyover
- Wetland flyover

Sherwood Arboretum is a heritage-listed arboretum at 39A Turner Street, Sherwood, Queensland, Australia. A 1946 addition to the site is also known as the John Herbert Memorial Vista. It was added to the Queensland Heritage Register on 3 May 2007.

== History ==
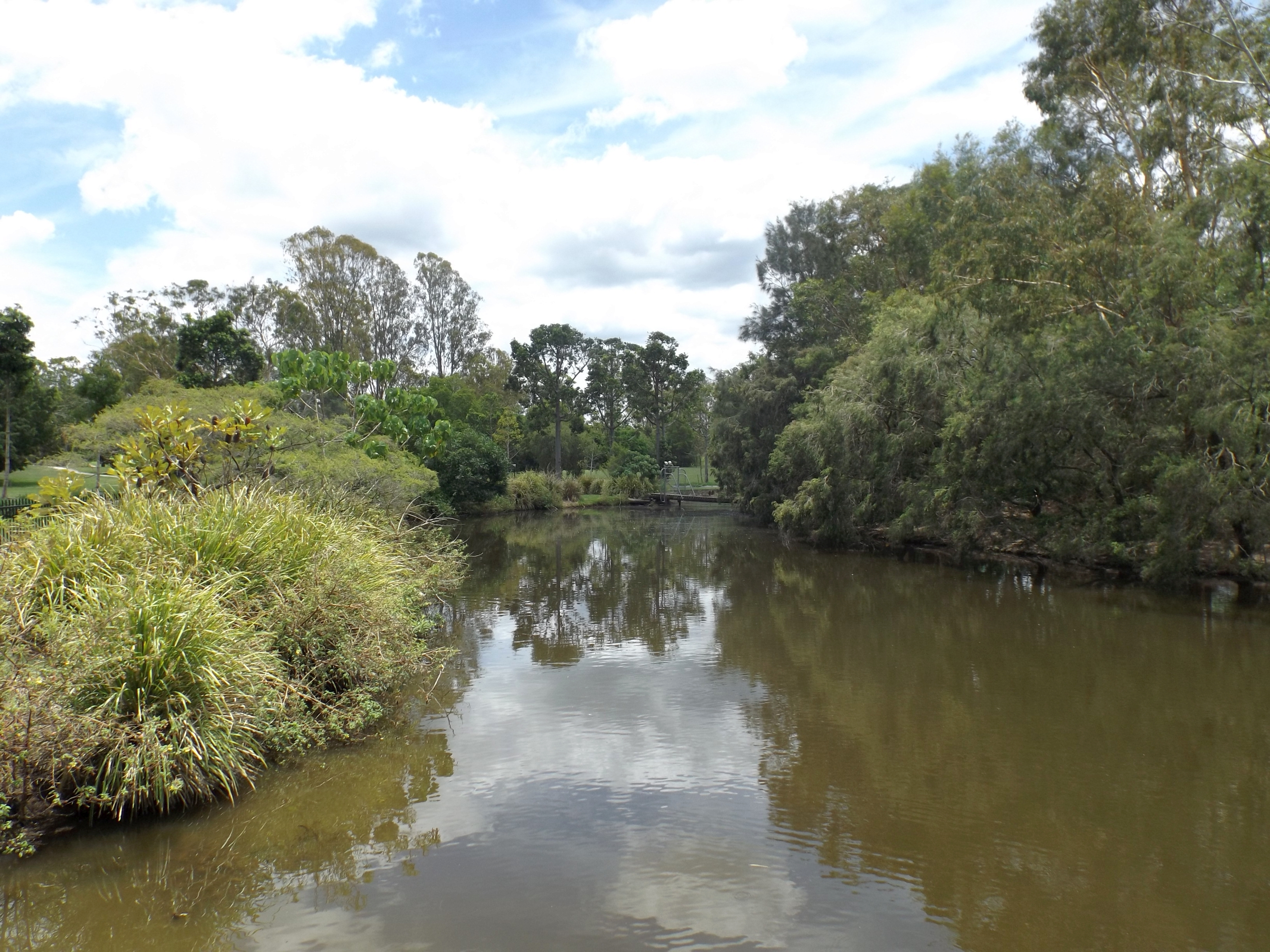
Wetlands, 2014

The Sherwood Arboretum covers an area of 15 hectares, containing approximately 1,100 trees from about 300 species. The arboretum comprises parkland, artificial freshwater wetland and has an extensive frontage to the Brisbane River.

In keeping with an international trend toward the application of scientific methods to forestry, and over concern for the depleting stock of Queensland's forests and commercial timbers, Sherwood Arboretum was established at the urging of a number of community interest groups, the Local Government Authorities and the Queensland Government.

In June 1922, the Curator of the Botanical Gardens, Ernest Walter Bick F.L.S. wrote to the Brisbane Deputy Town Clerk outlining the need to establish "...an Arboretum near the city where the growth of native and other trees could be studied". The Government Botanist, Cyril Tenison White, raised public awareness, when he wrote to the daily papers on 13 July 1922. The proposal was sponsored by the Empire Forest Association, and gathered the support of the Royal Society of Queensland, the Queensland Naturalists' Club, the Horticultural Society, the Australian Association for the Advancement of Science, the Public Health Association, and through a number of articles in the A & B Journal of Queensland.

No suitable land was initially identified within Brisbane Shire. In 1925, the Greater Brisbane Scheme saw the amalgamation of local councils and shires to establish the City of Brisbane. Land previously purchased by Sherwood Shire Council was considered suitable, and a proposal to dedicate land for arboretum purposes was strongly supported by the outgoing Sherwood Shire Council.

Symbolically, Sherwood Arboretum was officially opened on World Forestry Day, 21 March 1925, with a planting of 72 Queensland kauri (Agathis robusta) along a central promenade named Sir Matthew Nathan Avenue in honour of the Queensland Governor. It was initially known as Sherwood Forest Park.

Many of the people associated with the opening and the first plantings are well known today as founders of the state and Brisbane city, prominent local residents and landowners, and leading scientists of the day such as: Sir Matthew Nathan; William Jolly, the First Mayor of Greater Brisbane; Archbishop James Duhig, Roman Catholic Archbishop of Brisbane; Romeo Lahey, local timber mill owner and founder of the National Parks Association, W. D. Francis of the Queensland Herbarium and author of "Australian Rainforest Trees"; and Edward Swain, then District Inspector of Forests who became Director of Forests in 1928.

From its outset, the Sherwood Arboretum was focused on growing Australian trees, and especially Queensland trees. Over 600 specimens had been planted by 1929 with plans for another 400 in place. The temperature, climate and soils did not favour these early endeavours, and many of the plantings from the 1920s and 1930s appear to have failed.

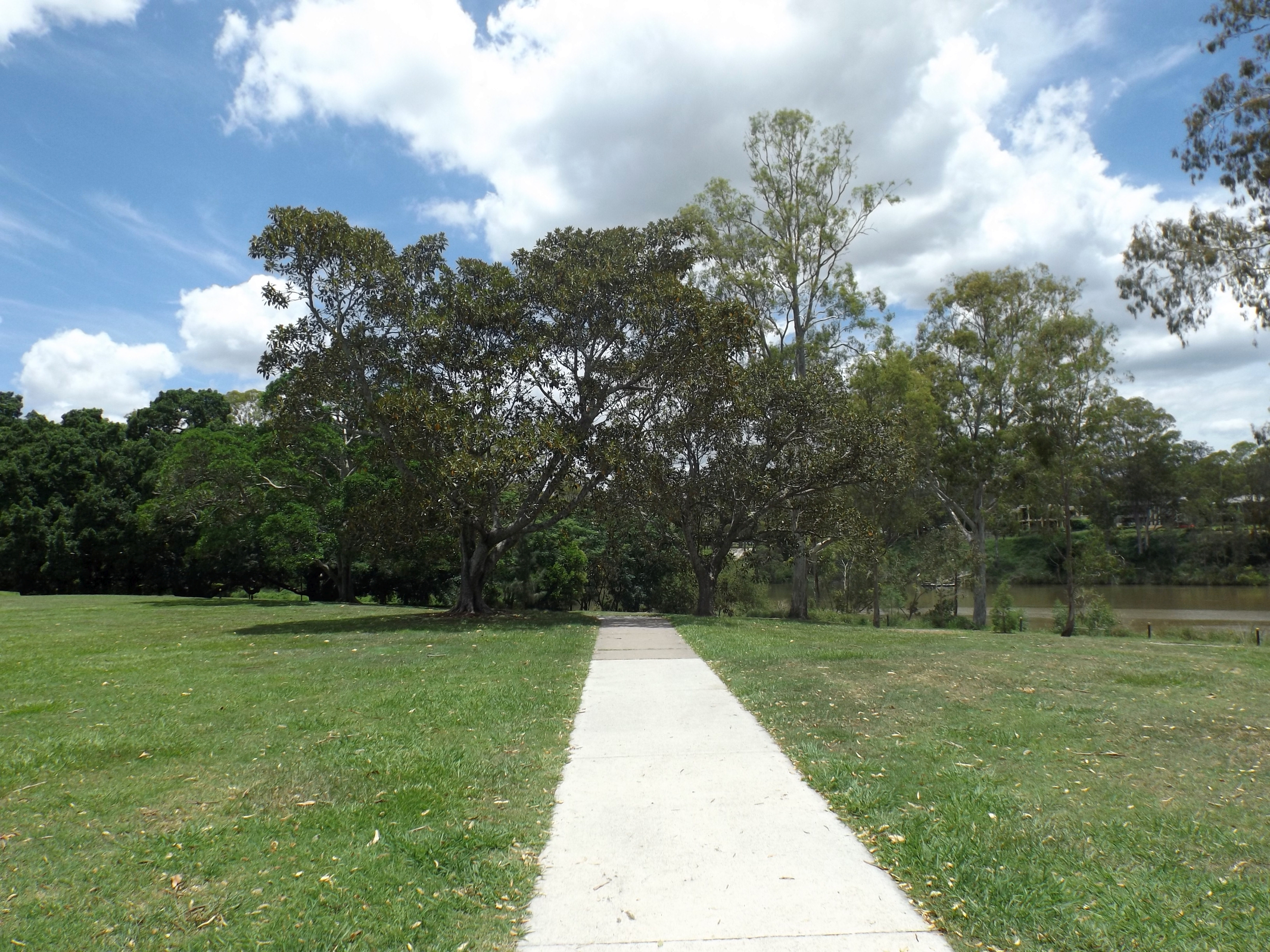
Moreton Bay figs and path, 2014

Significant tree plantings include pine, fig and native plum, such as: Queensland kauri (Agathis robusta); bull kauri (Agathis microstachya); bunya pine (Araucaria bidwillii); hoop pine (Araucaria cunninghamii); Bribie Island pine (Callitrus columellaris); Moreton Bay fig (Ficus macrophylla); Queensland weeping fig (Ficus microcarpa); cluster fig (Ficus racemosa); rusty fig (Ficus rubiginosa); and Queensland rarities like Burdekin plum, (Pleogynium timorense) and Davidson plum (Davidsonia pruriens). From the west, the more arid interior and tropical north are wilga (Geijera parviflora); broad-leafed bottle tree (Brachychiton australis); lacebark (Brachychiton discolor); tulip oak (Harpuilia pendula); with the Leichardt tree (Nauclea orientalis); celery wood (Polyscias elegans); yellow wood (Flindseria xanthoxyla). Mangroves occur along the river frontage: milky mangrove (Excoecaria agaloeha), grey mangrove (Auicennia marina) and river mangrove (Aegiceras corniculatum). Examples of exotic species are uncommon, but include a Syrian ash (Fraxinus syriaca) from Asia Minor.

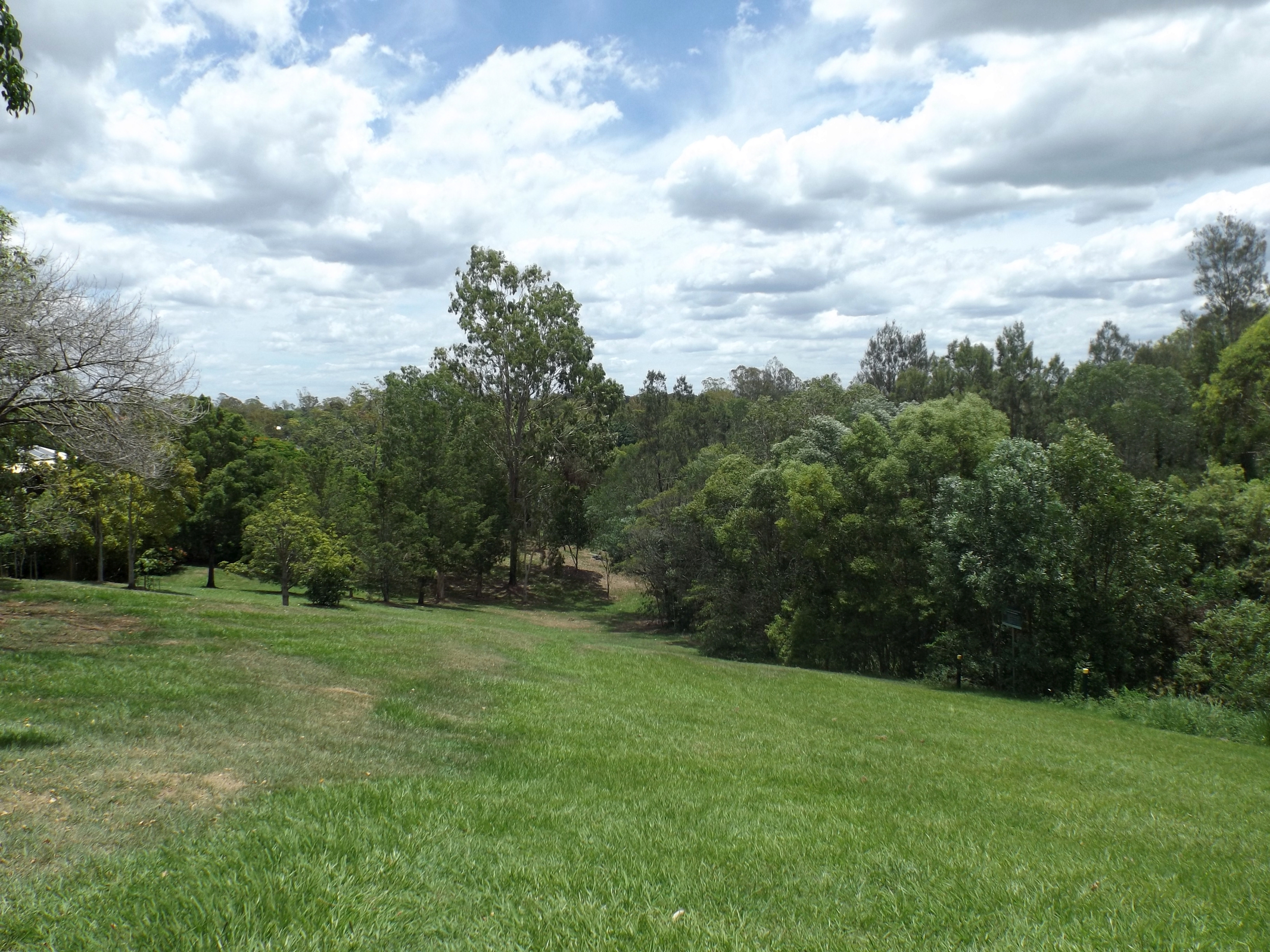
John Herbert Memorial Vista, 2014

In 1946, a number of land parcels and some connecting unformed roads were acquired adjacent the Arboretum. This addition is now named the John Herbert Memorial Vista, commemorating the State Member for Sherwood 1956–1978, who was an active member of the local community and had a long association with the National Trust of Queensland. The John Herbert Memorial Vista is managed as an integral part of the Arboretums natural biosystem.

The Sherwood Arboretum has a special association with Brisbane's renowned landscape architect, Harry Oakman, who was the Manager of Parks and Gardens for the Brisbane City Council from 1946 to 1963. Oakman had been Head Gardener, Department of Parks, for Newcastle City Council from 1940 to 1946. He later worked in Canberra, and wrote seven books on tropical and sub-tropical gardening. Harry Oakman (1906–2002) produced a major redesign of the Sherwood Arboretum, although his design was not implemented at the time. It has served subsequent generations, however, and the essential characteristics and elements of today's design reflect those advanced by Oakman by maintaining the original tree plantings and developing new elegant looping pedestrian pathways from the perimeter and within the main drive; capturing vistas overlooking the forests and the plantings; and culminating in the wharf and terminal.

A report by the Queensland Conservation Council released in 1975 claimed that Brisbane's parks were, in general, often flat, lacking in trees and natural water features, and had too much emphasis on built-recreation facilities. The report argued that too many buildings, sports clubs, car parks, and roads all defeated the purpose of parks as open spaces. The Sherwood Arboretum stands in stark contradiction to this generalisation.

The changing land use in and around Sherwood Arboretum, from Aboriginal resource, to colonial farm, to suburban subdivision, and finally to parkland, demonstrates the evolution of Queensland's history, and the process of the creation of open spaces as the area's population grew. The Brisbane City Council's management of the land at Sherwood reflected its interest in the international town planning movement of the time. Redesigns of the park also demonstrate changes in parks philosophy and use over time, with a shift in emphasis from formal genteel Edwardian avenues and strictly scientific pursuits, to the development and maintenance of living natural ecosystems with a rich and a diverse biota and multiple opportunities for leisure activities and leisurely interaction with the natural environment.

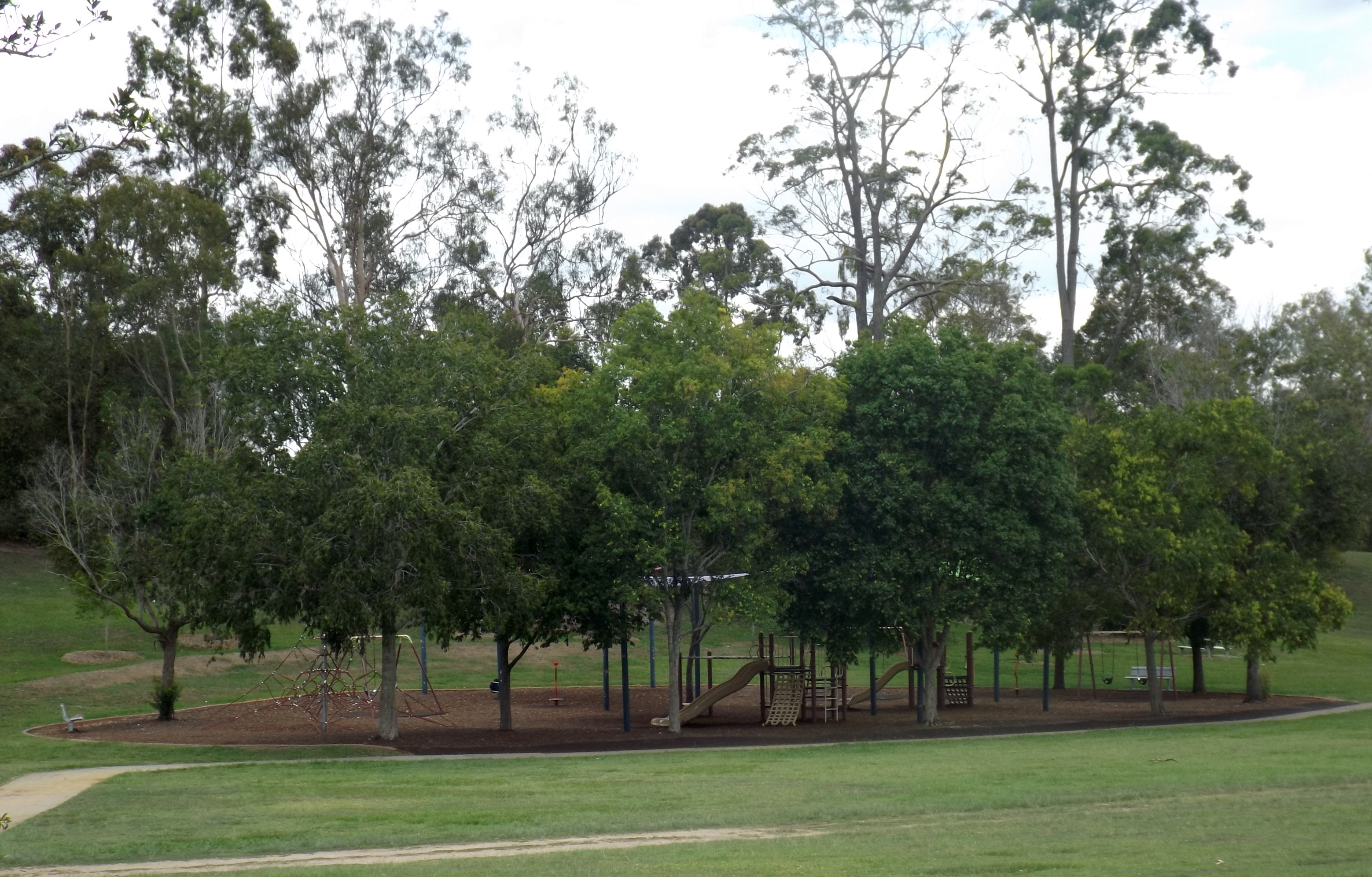
Playground, 2014

The park has a long-standing and strong association with the local community. The children's playground is very popular with local mothers and children. The mix of open space, timbered slopes and forest groves attracts the use of festival organisers, wedding parties, sportspeople, the elderly, picnickers and the disabled.

Current park use ranges from active to passive. Active use ranges from sports use, such school events and cross-country running, through numerous social events and festivals, playground use, weddings, cycling and jogging. More passive uses include picnics, strolls through the gardens, quiet contemplation, and visitation by tourists. Many of the trees have heavily scarred trunks and limbs, especially the long-lived figs, bearing the testimonials of the countless lovers who have felt inclined to leave their testimonials inscribed.

Sherwood Arboretum continues to hold its scientific and cultural values with Queensland native specimens and plantings vastly predominant, and exotics noticeable by their near absence.

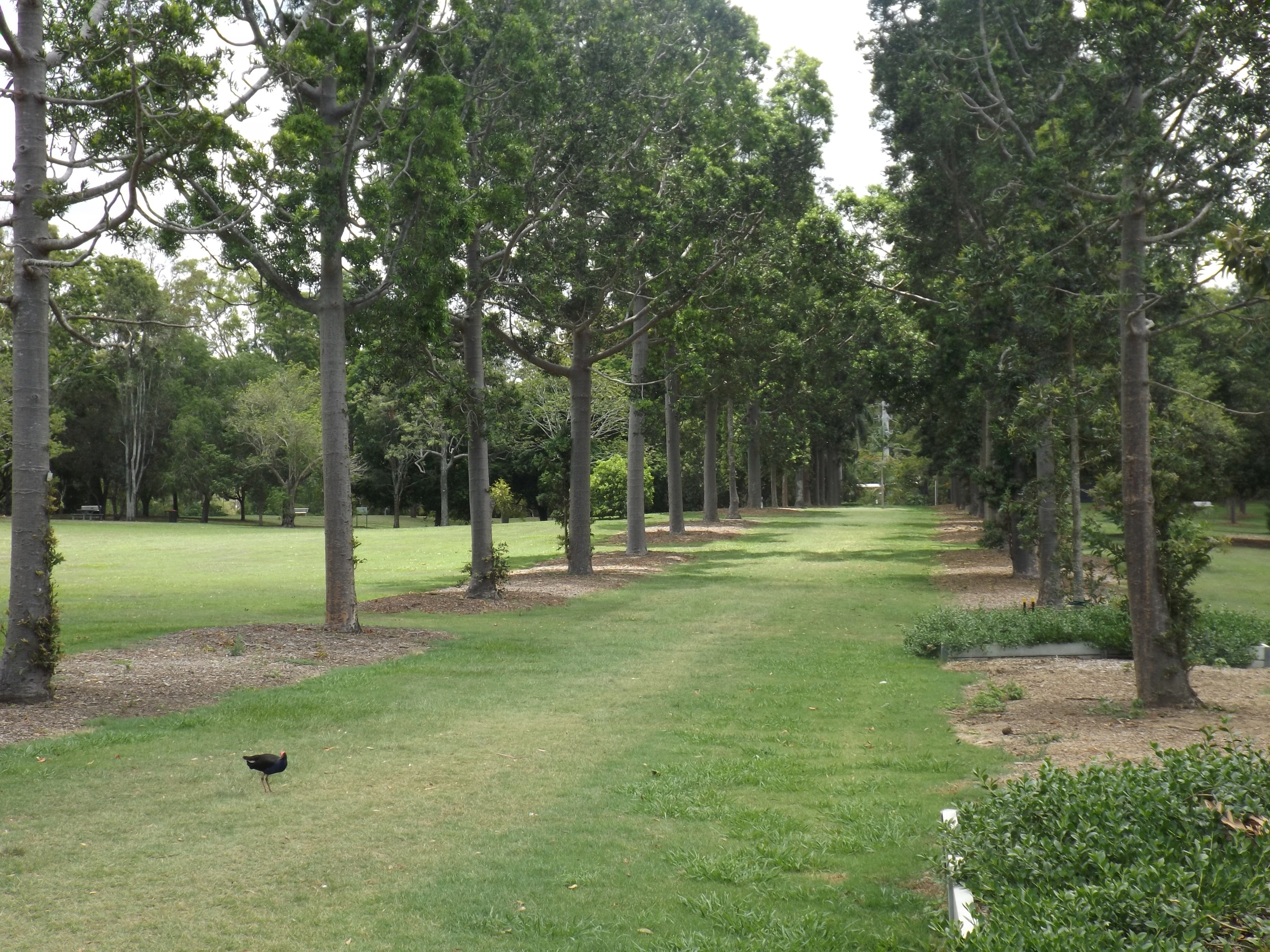
Queensland kauri plantings along Sir Mathew Nathan Avenue, 2014

The original formal Edwardian layout of the park as exemplified by the Queensland kauri plantings along Sir Mathew Nathan Avenue, has given way to less formal grove-like clumpings, more fluid and more in keeping with contemporary standards of garden design and aesthetics. The garden redesign undertaken by Harry Oakman has inspired the contemporary layout, although many of the earlier tree plantings remain.

The Sherwood Arboretum has a character of park planting that is a distinct aspect of Brisbane's historic parks and large gardens.

The Arboretum lands hold important environmental values for the suburb and Brisbane city as a whole by providing critical water habitat for native plants and animals, by maintaining in stream water quality and for flood mitigation. It is a bird watching site of State significance and international repute, with 124 species recorded.

The Arboretum continues to play a role in science, with new plantings of the rare and endangered angle-stemmed myrtle (Austromyrtus gonoclada) in accordance with the Government of Queensland's recovery plan for this species, and ongoing studies in ecology and reproductive strategies for the dusky moorhen (Gallinula tenebrosa).

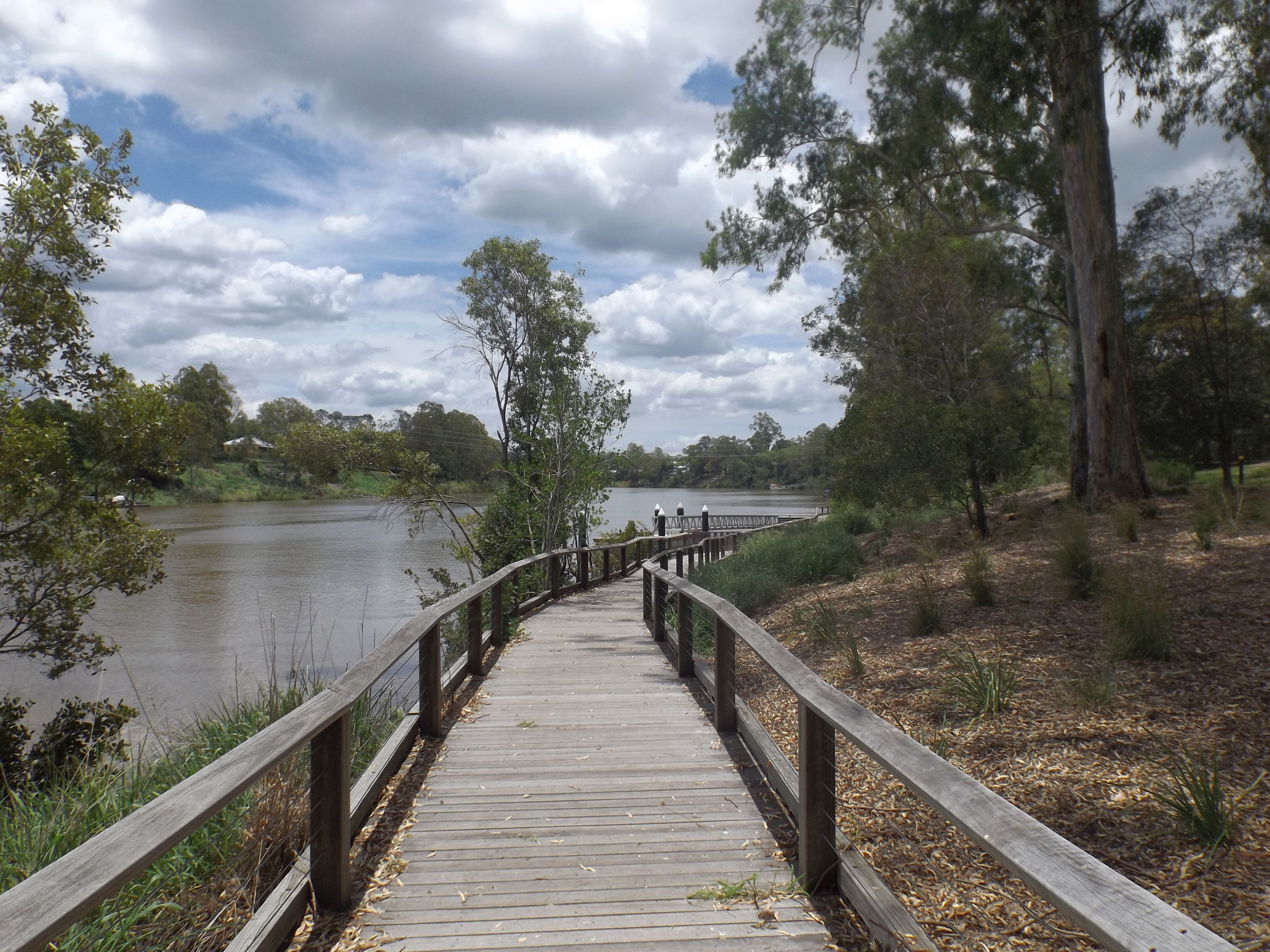
Boardwalk along Brisbane River, 2014

A series of improvements since 1974 has led to the establishment of two artificial freshwater lagoons, a children's playground, disabled user access, car parking improvements, a large roofed amenity block with bench seats and tables, a riverside boardwalk and public jetty on the river, and pedestrian pathway system, garden furniture, and an artistic installation commemorating the 1974 flood showing the height of the floodwaters. A toilet block was under construction at the time of the heritage listing. These structures are not considered to be significant.

== Description ==
A rolling open landscape provides a setting for clumped tree plantings, individual specimen trees, and an avenue of mature and semi-mature Queensland kauri.

The Sherwood Arboretum is bounded on the west by the Brisbane River and on the south-west by Jolimont and Turner Streets. Residential properties occur on the other boundaries. These properties are accessed from Joseph and Ferry Streets in the north; Dudley and Dunella Streets in the east; and Douglas Street in the south. Public vehicle access occurs off Jolimont Street with a 50 vehicle car park, and a smaller car park on Dewar Street directly into the John Herbert Memorial Vista.

Pedestrian access is provided from the Jolimont Street Car Park; off Dewar Street, Joseph Street, Turner Street; and from the pontoon on the Brisbane River centrally located on the Arboretum's eastern boundary.

== Heritage listing ==
Sherwood Arboretum (including the John Herbert Memorial Vista) was listed on the Queensland Heritage Register on 3 May 2007 having satisfied the following criteria.

The place is important in demonstrating the evolution or pattern of Queensland's history.

The Sherwood Arboretum is important as evidence for the development of modern scientific methods of managing forestry and timber production in Queensland following the First World War. The need for an arboretum in Queensland was identified by a number of eminent scientists and was supported by important scientific, commercial and community interest groups. The establishment of the Sherwood Arboretum was only achieved through cooperation between these groups and various levels of government, demonstrating the importance of the project. In keeping with a long tradition of tree planting by eminent persons, the Arboretum contains plantings by the then Governor, Sir Mathew Nathan, and numerous distinguished scientists, politicians, local landholders and community leaders.

The place demonstrates rare, uncommon or endangered aspects of Queensland's cultural heritage.

Sherwood Arboretum appears to be unique among Queensland's public open spaces and botanical gardens by its concentration on tree species native to Queensland, and by the virtual exclusion of exotics.

The place is important in demonstrating the principal characteristics of a particular class of cultural places.

Sherwood Arboretum is an important example of its type, combining public amenity and scientific purpose within an aesthetically pleasing arboreal landscape. It continues to serve its original function for research along with other public uses such as public relaxation, education and leisure.

The place is important because of its aesthetic significance.

The Sherwood Arboretum features riverside views, landscapes, and natural features that promote an appreciation of nature despite its limited acreage.

The place is important in demonstrating a high degree of creative or technical achievement at a particular period.

The Sherwood Arboretum is a managed landscape demonstrating a high level of creative and technical achievement in balancing aesthetically pleasing design characteristics with scientific requirements.

The place has a strong or special association with a particular community or cultural group for social, cultural or spiritual reasons.

Sherwood Arboretum is important to researchers and national and international visitors for its natural, aesthetic and scientific values, and is also valued by the local communities of Sherwood, Chelmer and Corinda as recreational space.
