= Graceville =

Graceville can refer to:

Australia

- Graceville, Queensland, a suburb of Brisbane
  - Graceville railway station, Brisbane
  - Graceville Memorial Park
  - Graceville Uniting Church

United States

- Graceville, Florida
- Graceville, Minnesota
- Graceville Township, Big Stone County, Minnesota
