= Central Buildings =

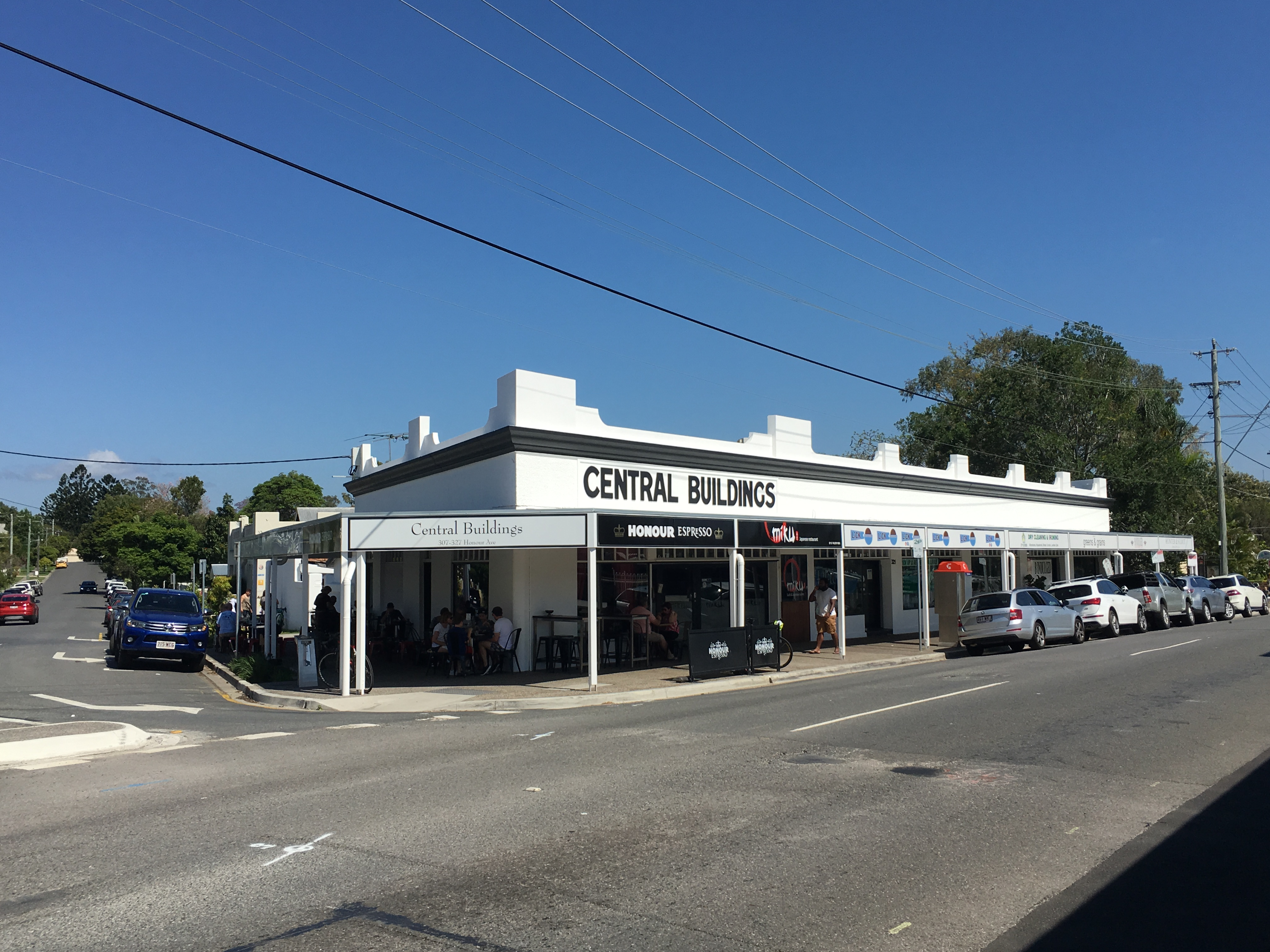
- Central Buildings, 2017

- Location within Queensland
- 27.5207°S 152.9755°E
- Location: 327 Honour Avenue, Graceville, City of Brisbane, Queensland, Australia

History
- Built: circa 1924

Site notes
- Architectural style: Art Deco

Brisbane Heritage Register
- Official name: Central Buildings
- Type: Retailing – Shop/s
- Reference no.: 745
- Builders: Walter Taylor

The Central Buildings are a heritage-listed series of six shops located at 327 Honour Avenue, Graceville, Brisbane, Queensland, Australia. They are a single-story structure located between Verney Road West and Rakeevan Road and have been listed on the Brisbane Heritage Register as a Local Heritage Place since 1 July 2005, due to being an art deco construction from the interwar period built by local visionary Walter Taylor.

== History ==
The Central Buildings were constructed in 1924 to cater to locals, after the growth and commercial potential of the area became evident to Walter Taylor.

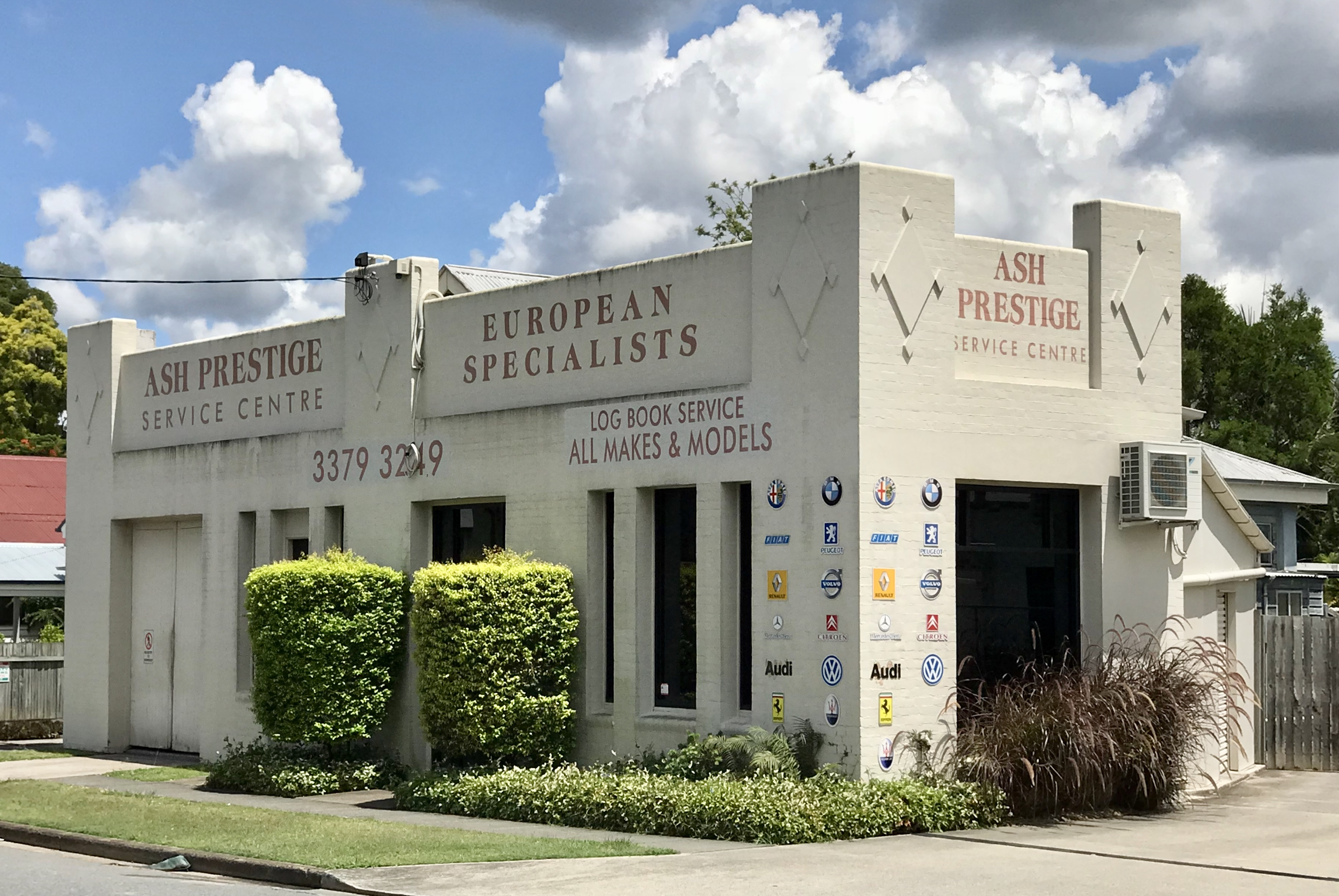
Former Bulk Store now used as a garage

The "Bulk Store", which is located on the Rakeevan Street side of the complex, originally was designed and built to house Taylor's office, but is now used as a garage. The front of the building on the side nearest the Graceville railway station contained his desk and the other side had drafting boards and plans. An extensive warehouse was located at the back with a large work bench, which was the full length of the building.

The Indooroopilly Toll Bridge company had their office in the Central Buildings while they gathered investors to construct the Indooroopilly Toll Bridge (later to be renamed the Walter Taylor Bridge).

The design of the building influenced the design for the Graceville Station in 1958.

== Heritage listing ==
The Central Buildings were listed on the Brisbane Heritage Register, as they:

- demonstrate the historical commercial development in Graceville
- demonstrate the principal characteristics of a larger suburban interwar commercial premises
- demonstrate the Art Deco style in commercial buildings
- have associations with Walter Taylor, a significant local builder
