= Leslie Thiess =

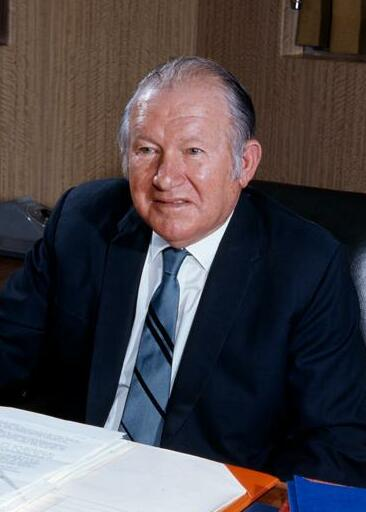
- Born: Leslie Charles Thiess; 1909; Drayton
- Died: 25 November 1992; Brisbane
- Awards: Commander of the Order of the British Empire (1968); Knight Bachelor (1971); Distinguished Constructor Award (1999)

Sir Leslie Charles Thiess CBE (8 April 1909 – 25 November 1992) was a construction and mining industry entrepreneur, based in Queensland, Australia. He was one of the founders of Thiess.

With a humble background, and one of eleven children, Thiess founded a contracting firm in 1933, in partnership with Henry Horn. Under his leadership, the company became a major contractor in Queensland and, when Horn retired in 1939, the firm became Thiess Bros. It prospered from a succession of military engineering contracts during World War II, and Thiess and his four brothers formed Thiess Holdings in 1950. The firm was floated on the Sydney and Brisbane stock exchanges in 1958.

In 1968, Thiess was appointed a Commander of the Order of the British Empire (CBE) and, in 1971, he was knighted. In 1976, he relinquished the managing director role at Thiess, but remained as chairman.

After a hostile takeover by CSR in 1979, Thiess lost control of his company but, with assistance from two major backers, he bought back the construction division, continuing to develop coal mines and work on major Queensland government contracts, as well as being granted the licence for a casino in Townsville.

In the 1980s, it was alleged on television that he had delivered a hangar to the property of Queensland premier Joh Bjelke-Petersen, and had done private civil engineering works for Bjelke-Petersen that were written off as "Queensland Government Projects". Thiess sued Channel 9 for defamation, and won a minimal $55,050 in damages, but the jury found many of the allegations to be true. Thiess's appeal to the High Court was dismissed, with costs. It was clear that he had increasingly made use of his closeness to politicians and officials to obtain contracts, sometimes using inducements.

In 1999, he received posthumously the Distinguished Constructor Award from the Queensland University of Technology.
