= John Holland (engineer) =

Australian engineer (1914–2009)

Sir John Holland AC (21 June 1914 – 31 May 2009) was an Australian engineer and construction magnate, who founded the John Holland Construction Group (later named John Holland (Holdings) Pty Ltd) in 1949. He was managing director until 1972, Chairman until 1986, and President from 1986 until his death. The company is now owned by China Communications Construction.

== Biography ==
Clifton Vaughan Holland was born on 21 June 1914, the eighth of ten children, and was raised on his family's farm on the Mornington Peninsula, south-east of Melbourne. He acquired the informal name John at an early age, and he was always known as John Holland thereafter. He studied civil engineering at the University of Melbourne and then worked for the Commonwealth Oil Refineries for three years. He joined the army when World War II broke out, and served in the Middle East, Greece and the Pacific, becoming a lieutenant-colonel. He returned to civil engineering, setting up his own business in 1949. His first contract was to build a shed on a property in western Victoria owned by a farmer named Malcolm Fraser, who would later go into politics and become the Prime Minister of Australia.

Holland retired as chairman of the John Holland Group in 1986, and the company was purchased by Heytesbury Pty Ltd in 1991. In 2000 the Leighton Group bought 70 per cent of John Holland Group; this was increased to 100 per cent in October 2007. The company was sold to China Communications Construction in April 2015.

He took a personal interest in every employee, and insisted they be involved in community service. He himself was involved in various causes, including the board of the Royal Melbourne Hospital, the Bone Marrow Foundation, a co-founder of the National Stroke Foundation, the Voluntary Euthanasia Society, chairman of the Sir Edward Dunlop Memorial Committee and, from 2000, as patron of the Children First Foundation. He was a keen sportsman in his younger days, and later became president of Royal Melbourne Golf Club and patron of Flinders Golf Club.

== Honours and awards ==
John Holland was knighted in 1973 for services to engineering, and made a Companion of the Order of Australia (AC) in 1988 for service to the community, particularly to youth and in the field of medical research.

Holland received the Peter Nicol Russell Memorial Award (1974), the Kernot Medal of the University of Melbourne (1976), the Consulting Engineers Advancement Society Medal (1984), and the Queensland University of Technology Distinguished Constructor Award and the Australian Constructors Association Award for Distinguished Service (both 2001).

Holland was a Foundation Fellow and from 1975 to 1980 the first Honorary Treasurer of the Australian Academy of Technological Sciences and Engineering, and in November 2004 he was elected an Honorary Fellow of the Academy, a rarely awarded honour.

The Civil College Board of Engineers Australia have honoured Sir John by naming its annual award for Civil Engineer of the Year the "Sir John Holland Civil Engineer of the Year" in his honour.

== Family ==
In 1942, Sir John Holland married Emily Joan née Atkinson, with whom he had a daughter and three sons. She died in 1999 and in 2003 he married Suzanne Wharton.

== Death ==
Holland died at Cabrini Hospital, Melbourne on 31 May 2009, aged 94.

== Legacy ==
Since 1999 Engineers Australia has a Sir John Holland Award for Civil Engineer of the Year.

== Sources ==
- Carman, Gerry (4 June 2009). "Nation-builder reached out to others". The Age.
- John Holland Group
- Express
