= Distinguished Constructor Award =

The Queensland University of Technology Distinguished Constructor Award recognises significant contributions by individuals to the Queensland construction industry and community and to honour those who have given a lifetime of work to the industry. The achievements of Queensland's most admired construction industry leaders are further acknowledged by their induction into the QUT Construction Hall of Fame.

== History ==
The award was established in 1998, the initiative of Professor Weilin Chang, the then Dean of the Faculty of Built Environment and Engineering, who saw it as a way to "give something back to industry".

== Criteria ==
Recipients are selected by a panel of their peers, which includes senior academics from QUT and leaders from Queensland's construction industry and Government. There is no external nomination process – the panel brings forward people for consideration based on their extensive knowledge of the construction scene.

== The Award ==
The award itself was designed by the then QUT industrial design lecturer Steve Curran while the original Hall of Fame display was designed by QUT student, Anna Nelson, after winning a design competition. The Award is presented annually at a venue on the Gardens Point campus of the QUT. A Construction Hall of Fame has been created at QUT's Gardens Point campus as a permanent site for the recognition of the endeavours of leaders of the construction industry in Queensland.

== Recipients ==
Name	Year
Sir Manuel Hornibrook OBE, FAIB Mr Clyde Ian Barclay CBE, AM, FAIB	1998
Sir Leslie Thiess CBE Mr Jack Hutchinson AM	1999
Mr John Panizza OBE Sir John Clifton Vaughan Holland AC, FTSE	2000
Mr Cyril Golding Mr Alfred John (Jack) Bond	2001
Sir John Pidgeon Ms Valmai Pidgeon AM	2002
Mr Martin Carl Albrecht AC Mr Alfred Henry Hodge	2003
Dr Don Fry AO Dr John Job Crew Bradfield CMG	2004
Mr Ric Barton Mr Ron McMaster OBE	2005
Mr John Seymour Mr Rollo Gallop	2006
Mr Joshua Jeays Mr Walter Sommer OAM	2007
Mr Jose Goicoechea Mr William Wild	2008
Mr Michael Power AM Mr Peter Dare AM	2009
Mr John Petrie Mr John Hull	2010
Adjunct Professor John Hornibrook; Mr Walter Taylor	2011
Mr John Kindler; Mr Ken Casley	2012
Mr Roger Trundle; Mr Greg Quinn	2013
Mr John Taylor; Mr John Gaskin	2014
Mr Geoff Murphy; Young Constructor Recipient: Mr Ben Cummins	2015
