= John Holland Group =

Infrastructure company based in Melbourne, Australia

John Holland
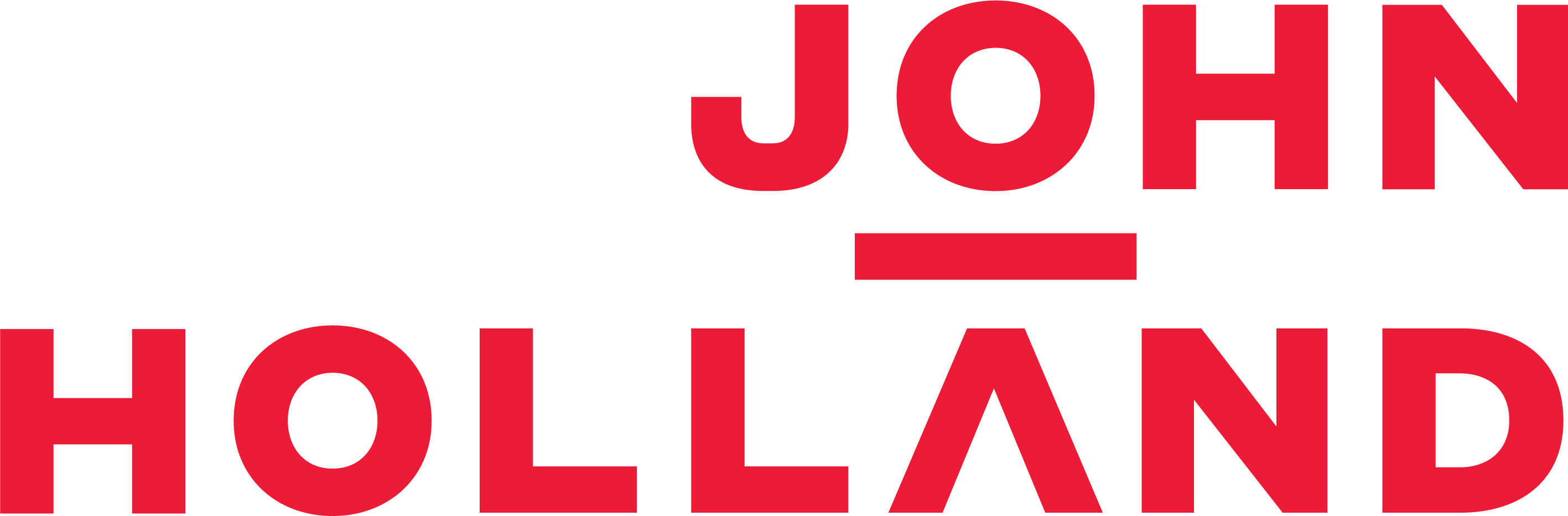

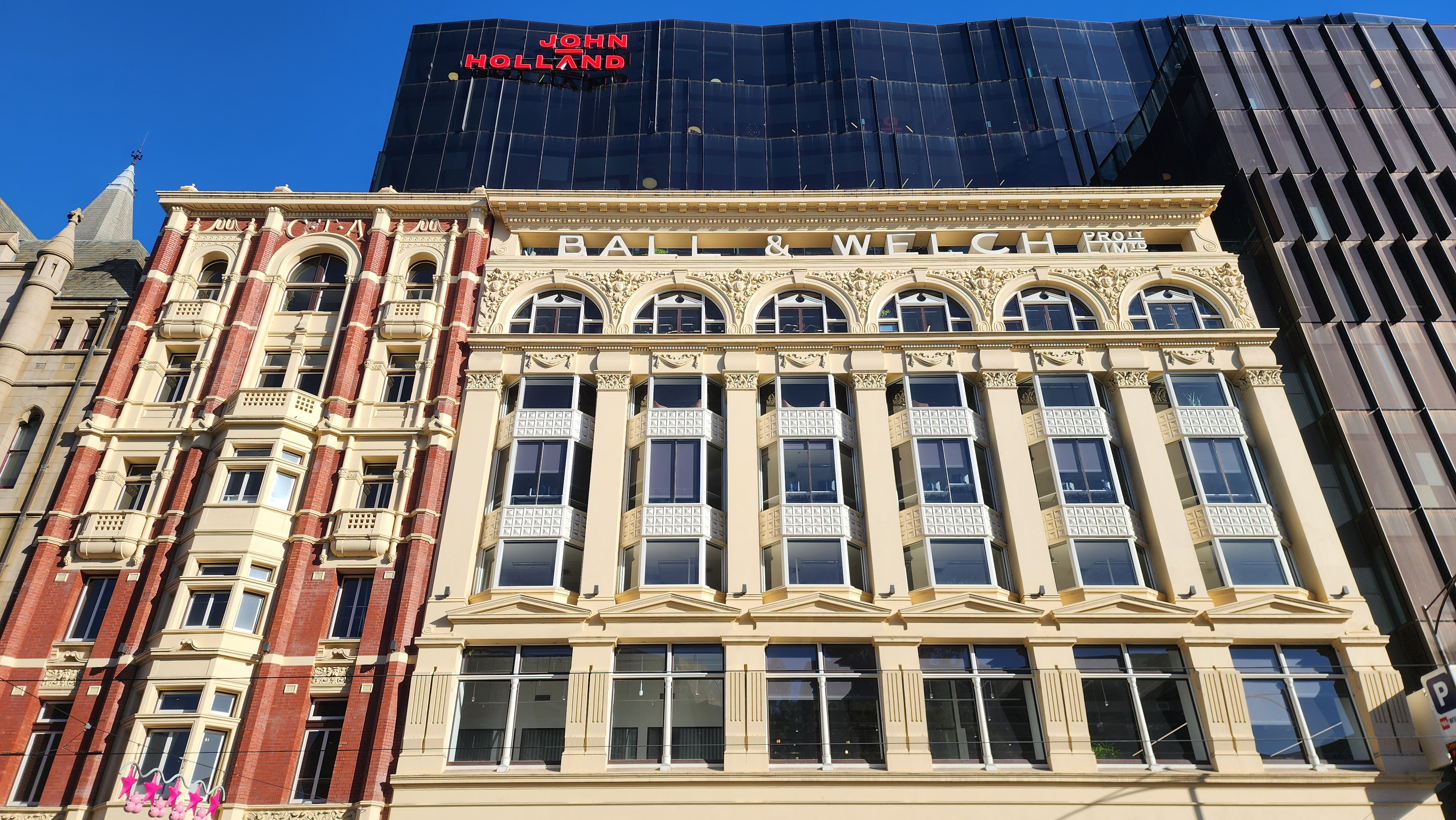
- John Holland headquarters in Melbourne
- Industry: Construction
- Founded: 1949
- Founder: John Holland
- Headquarters: Melbourne, Australia
- Area served: Australia; New Zealand; South East Asia
- Key people: Glenn Palin (acting CEO)
- Parent: China Communications Construction
- Website: www.johnholland.com.au

The John Holland Group is an infrastructure, building, rail and transport business operating in Australia and New Zealand. Headquartered in Melbourne, it is a subsidiary of China Communications Construction.

== History ==
The company was founded in 1949 by John Holland. In 1991 the business was purchased by Janet Holmes à Court's Heytesbury Pty Ltd. In 2000, Leighton Holdings bought a 70% stake in the company, this was increased to 99% in 2004 and 100% in December 2007. In December 2002, the construction assets of Transfield Holdings were acquired.

In November 2012, John Holland Tunnelling was awarded the International Tunnelling Contractor of the Year, for the Northern Sewerage Project in Melbourne.

In December 2014, Leighton Holdings agreed terms with China Communications Construction to sell John Holland. The transaction was completed in April 2015 after the federal government approved the sale.

== Major projects ==
Major projects include:

- Picnic Bay Jetty, Queensland, completed in 1959
- Captain Cook Bridge, Sydney, completed in 1965
- Roseville Bridge, Sydney, completed in 1966
- Second Como railway bridge, Sydney, completed in 1972
- William Walter Mason Bridge, Queensland, completed in 1977
- West Gate Bridge, Melbourne, completed in 1978
- Splityard Creek Dam, Queensland, completed in 1980
- AIS Arena, Canberra, completed in 1981
- Sydney Entertainment Centre, completed in 1983
- Parliament House, Canberra, completed in 1988
- Newman to Port Hedland section of the Great Northern Highway, completed in 1990
- Borallon Correctional Centre, Queensland, completed in 1990
- Joondalup Health Campus, Perth, completed in 1998
- Goodwill Bridge, Brisbane, completed in 2001
- Alice Springs to Darwin railway line, completed in 2004
- Eleanor Schonell Bridge, Brisbane, completed in 2006
- Open-pool Australian lightwater reactor, Sydney, completed in 2006
- Lane Cove Tunnel, Sydney, completed in 2007
- Mandurah railway line, Western Australia, completed in 2007
- EastLink, Melbourne, completed in 2008
- Airport Flyover, Brisbane, completed in 2011
- Windsor to Kedron section of the Northern Busway, Brisbane, completed in 2012
- Airport Link, Brisbane, completed in 2012
- South Road Superway, Adelaide, completed in 2014
- Lilyfield to Dulwich Hill section of the Inner West Light Rail, Sydney, completed in 2014
- Stage 2 of the South West Rail Link, Sydney, completed in 2015
- City to Maribyrnong River, Regional Rail Link, Melbourne, completed in 2015
- South Island line, Hong Kong, completed in 2016
- Ravenhall Correctional Centre, Victoria, completed in 2017
- Sydney Metro Northwest, Sydney, completed in 2019
- M4 East, Sydney, completed in 2019
- Canberra Metro, completed in 2019
- Calvary Adelaide Hospital, Adelaide, completed in 2020
- Sydney Football Stadium, Sydney, completed in 2022
- Sydney Metro City & Southwest, Sydney, completed in 2024
- Metro Tunnel, Melbourne, completed in 2025
- Sunbury railway line upgrade, Melbourne, completed in 2023
- West Gate Tunnel, Melbourne, completed in 2025

== Transport ==
As part of the consortium selected to build the Alice Springs to Darwin railway line, John Holland took a 7.5% shareholding in the Asia Pacific Transport Consortium in 2000. John Holland has interests in Metro Trains Melbourne and Metro Trains Sydney that operate the Melbourne suburban train network and Sydney Metro respectively.

In January 2012, John Holland Rail (JHR) commenced the operation and maintenance of the New South Wales Country Regional Network (CRN) under a ten-year contract with Transport for NSW, comprising 2,400 route kilometres of operational passenger and freight rail lines and 3,100 route kilometres of non-operational lines. This ceased in January 2022 with the contract passing to UGL Rail.

In April 2019, John Holland commenced the operation and maintenance of the Canberra Light Rail through its Canberra Metro Operations joint venture.

In July 2020, John Holland became responsible for maintenance of the Glenelg tram line in Adelaide as part of the Torrens Connect consortium.

In April 2022, Transdev John Holland (25% owned by John Holland) commenced operating Sydney Bus Region 9 in the Eastern Suburbs under contract to Transport for NSW. In December 2024, another Transdev–John Holland joint venture, Yarra Journey Makers (49% owned by John Holland), took over the operation of Yarra Trams in Melbourne.
