= Graceville, Queensland =

Graceville
- Suburb
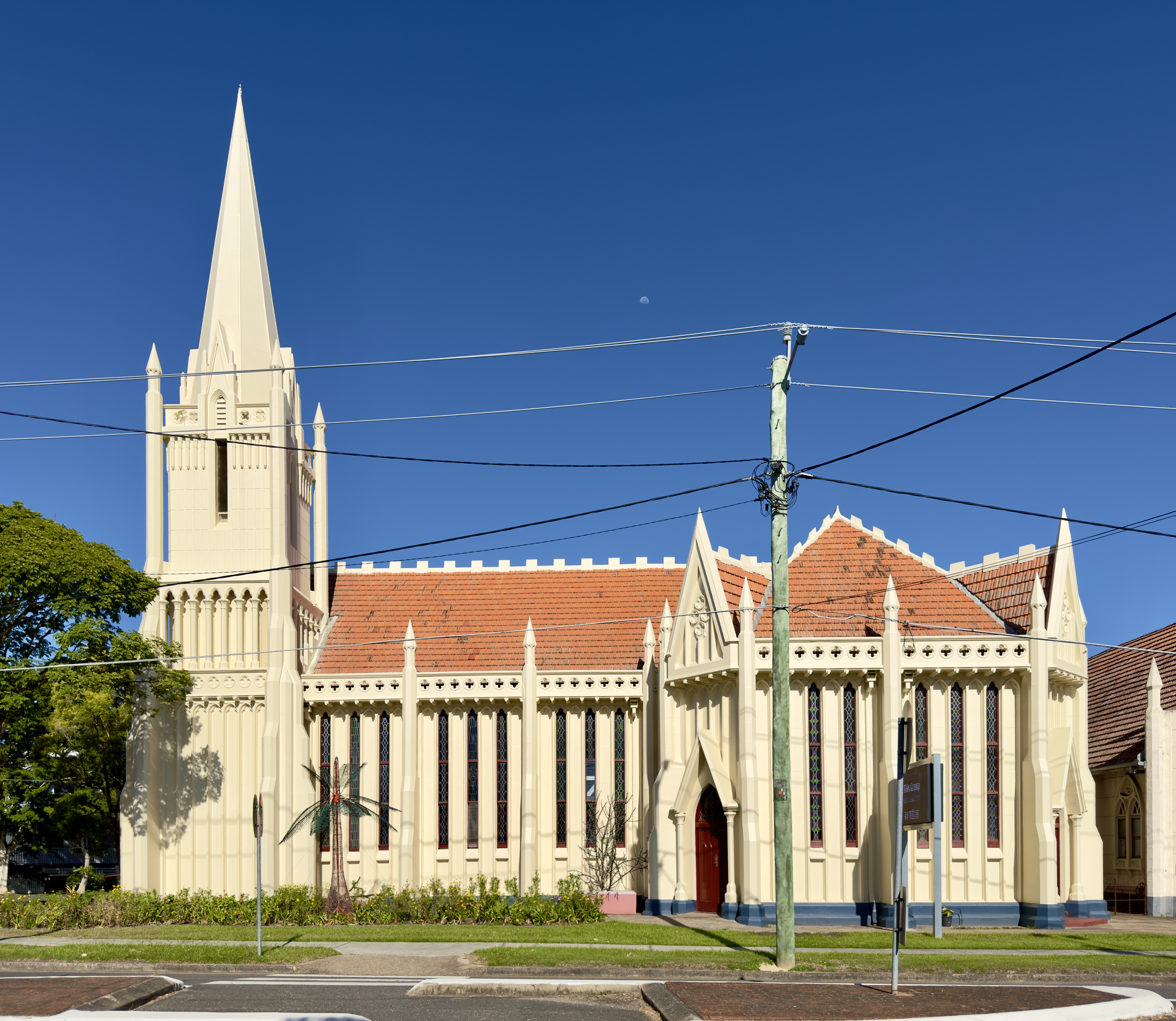
- Graceville Uniting Church, 2026

- Interactive map of Graceville
- Coordinates: 27.5211°S 152.9819°E
- Country: Australia
- State: Queensland
- City: Brisbane
- LGA: City of Brisbane (Tennyson Ward)
- Location: 2.5 km (1.6 mi) N of Corinda; 2.6 km (1.6 mi) S of Indooroopilly; 10.3 km (6.4 mi) SW of Brisbane CBD

Government
  - State electorate: Miller
  - Federal division: Moreton

Area
  - Total: 2.1 km^{2} (0.81 sq mi)
- Elevation: 20 m (66 ft)

Population
  - Total: 4,764 (2021 census)
  - Density: 2,270/km^{2} (5,880/sq mi)
- Time zone: UTC+10:00 (AEST)
- Postcode: 4075
Suburbs around Graceville
Chelmer	Chelmer	Chelmer
Fig Tree Pocket	Graceville	Indooroopilly
Sherwood	Sherwood	Tennyson

Graceville is a suburb in the City of Brisbane, Queensland, Australia. In the 2021 census, Graceville had a population of 4,764 people.

== Geography ==
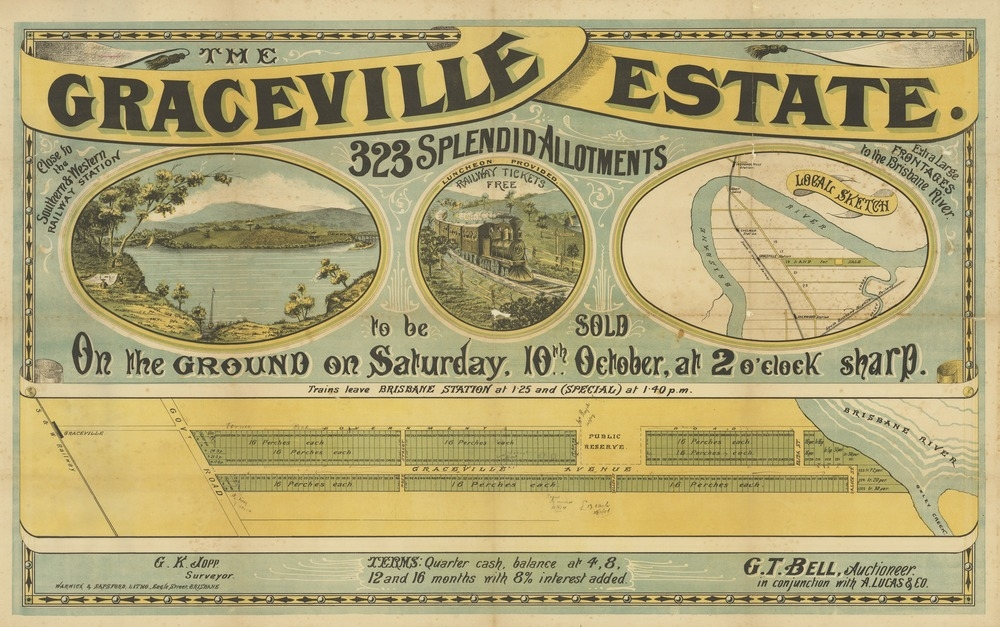
Real estate map of The Graceville Estate, circa 1888

Graceville is located 7.8 kilometres (4.8 mi) south-west of the Brisbane CBD, and is bordered by the Brisbane River to the North-East and West, Oxley Creek to the East, Chelmer to the North and Sherwood to the South.

The suburb is centred on Graceville railway station (27.5206°S 152.9759°E) on the Ipswich railway line, and is predominantly residential, with houses generally being in the Queenslander style. The main roads in Graceville are Oxley Road, Graceville Avenue and Honour Avenue. The suburb also has a number of parks including Simpson's Playground, Graceville Memorial Park, and Faulkner Park.

== History ==
A Baptist chapel opened near the junction of Oxley Creek and the Brisbane River on Sunday 22 May 1864. It was on land donated by John and Thomas Strong (approx 27.5242°S 152.9937°E). The Oxley Creek chapel was also used by other denominations, particularly the Presbyterians. It is unclear when the chapel closed but it is no longer extant.

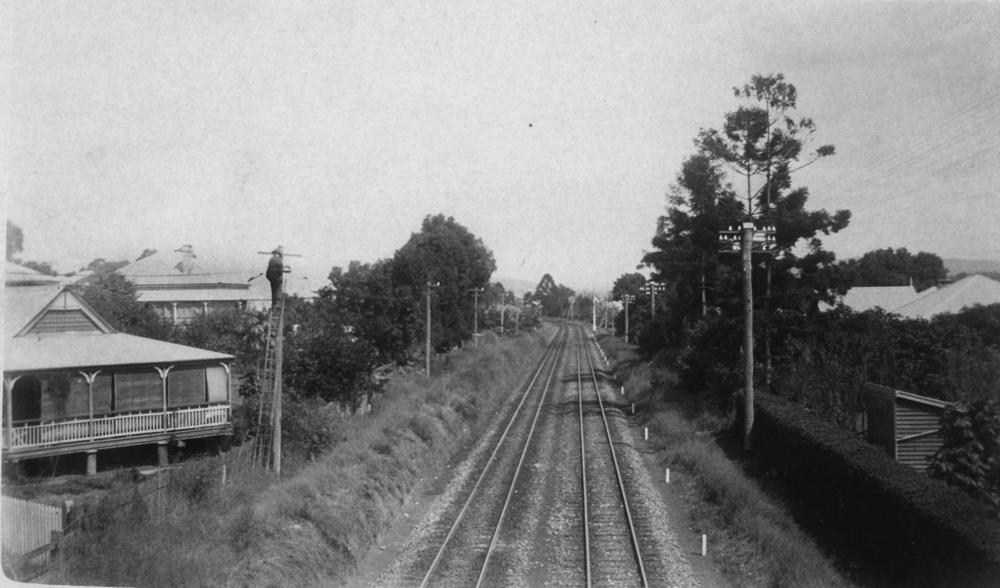
Railway at Graceville, circa 1915

The suburb takes its name from its railway station, which in turn was named on 4 February 1875 by the Queensland Railways Department after Grace Grimes, the daughter of Samuel Grimes.

In 1879, the local government area of Yeerongpilly Division was created. In 1891, parts of Yeerongpilly Division were excised to create Sherwood Division becoming a Shire in 1903 which contained the suburb of Graceville. In 1925, the Shire of Sherwood was amalgamated into the City of Brisbane.

In December 1887, allotments in re-subdivisions 1 to 227 of subdivision 2 of portion 17, County of Stanley, Parish of Oxley, of "Graceville Park Estate" were advertised to be auctioned by R.J. Cottell, Auctioneer. A map advertising the auction states the estate includes Park Road, White Street, and Alfred Street. The classified advertisement for the auction states the estate is "only a stone's throw from the Railway Station and "is a splendid piece of ground, with a gentle slope to the river."

In December 1911, 207 allotments of the "Graceville Estate" were advertised to be auctioned by Currie, Buchanan & Co. Ltd. Auctioneers. A map advertising the auction states that the estate was "situated within easy walking distance of Graceville Railway Station". The classified advertisement for the auction states the estate had "Cool, invigorating breeze, every allotment ready to build on, right aspect, abundance of fresh air, charming views, exclusive neighbourhood."

On 24 April 1926, the "Memorial Park Estate" was advertised by Realty Development Co. Ltd. The advertisements in the Telegraph included a "catch-phrase" competition with first prize being a block of land in the Memorial Park Estate.

In June 1926, 43 allotments of the "Greenfield Estate" were advertised to be auctioned by Charlton, Elliot and Sons. A map advertising the auction states that the estate was "within easy walking distance of Graceville Station". The classified advertisement for the auction states the estate was in "easy walking distance to station, good train service, water and electric light".

Graceville Baptist Church opened on Saturday 22 January 1927. The building was 31 by 21 feet (9.4 by 6.4 m) in size and could seat 100 people.

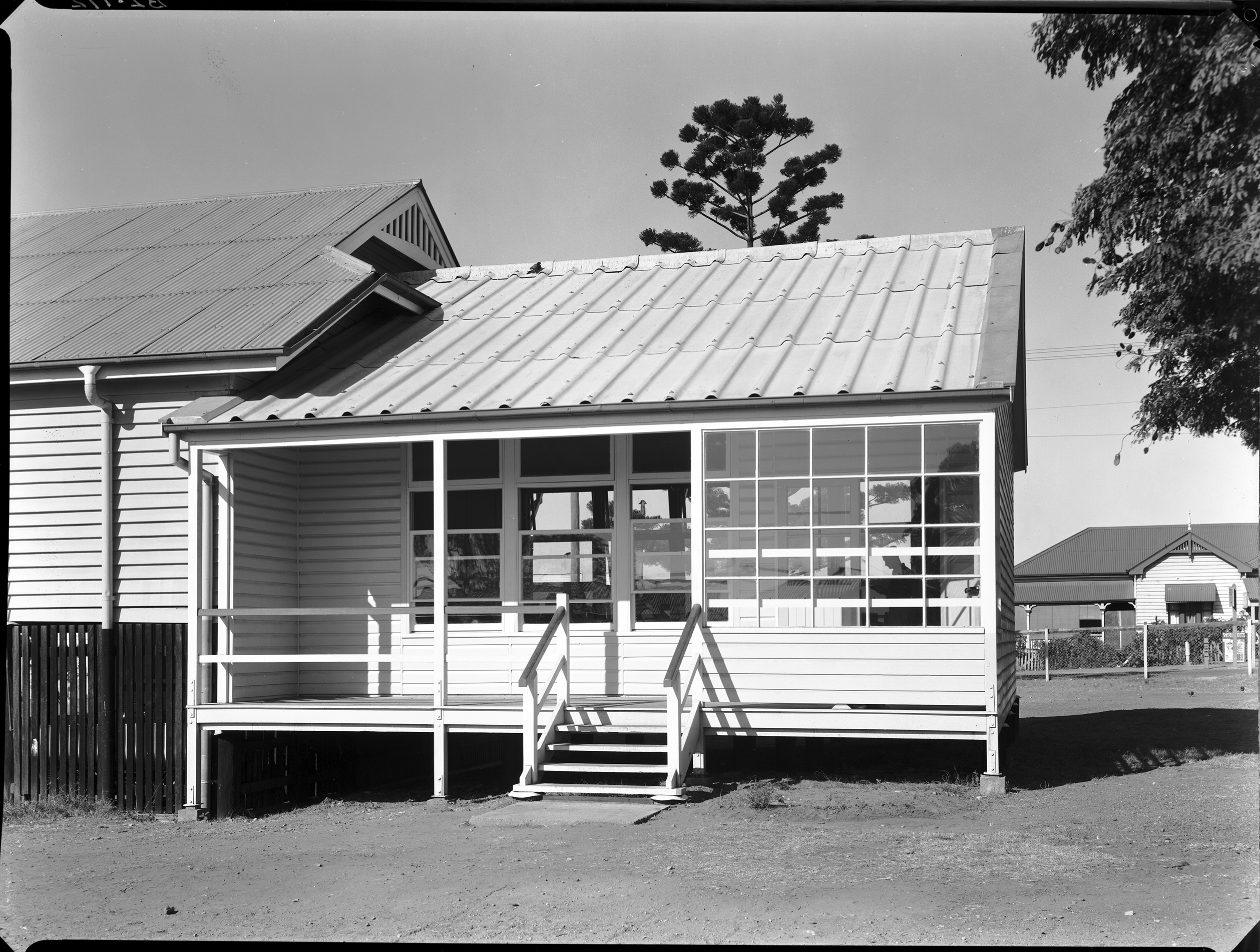
New classroom, Graceville State School, 1952

Graceville State School opened on 13 August 1928.

Graceville Uniting Church was opened in 1930. It was designed and built by local contractor Walter Taylor. It is a noted landmark in the suburb.

Christ the King Catholic Primary School opened on 25 January 1937 with an initial 60 students with four Presentation Sisters as teachers.

St Peter's Anglican Church was dedicated on 1 July 1956 by Venerable Frank Knight. Its last service was held on 27 February 1982. It was on Graceville Avenue (approx 27.5221°S 152.9832°E).

== Demographics ==
In the 2011 census, Graceville recorded a population of 4,213 people, 51.7% female and 48.3% male. The median age of the Graceville population was 37 years of age, the same as the national median. 77.1% of people living in Graceville were born in Australia, compared to the national average of 69.8%; the next most common countries of birth were England 4.4%, New Zealand 2.9%, United States of America 1.1%, Scotland 0.9%, South Africa 0.8%. 89.4% of people spoke only English at home; the next most popular languages were 0.8% Vietnamese, 0.7% Mandarin, 0.6% Polish, 0.5% German, 0.5% Cantonese.

In the 2016 census, Graceville had a population of 4,634 people.

In the 2021 census, Graceville had a population of 4,764 people.

== Heritage listings ==
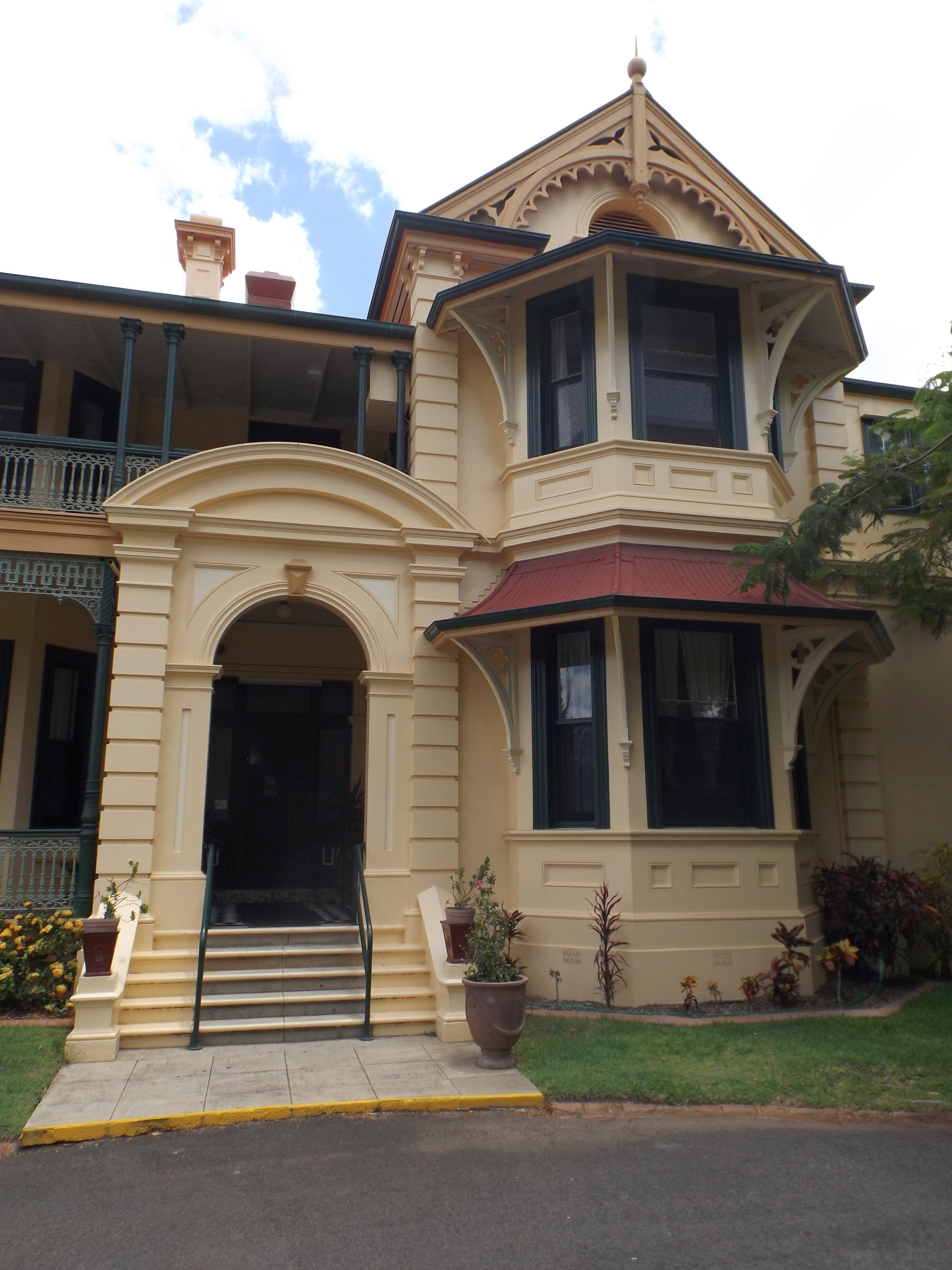
Beth-Eden

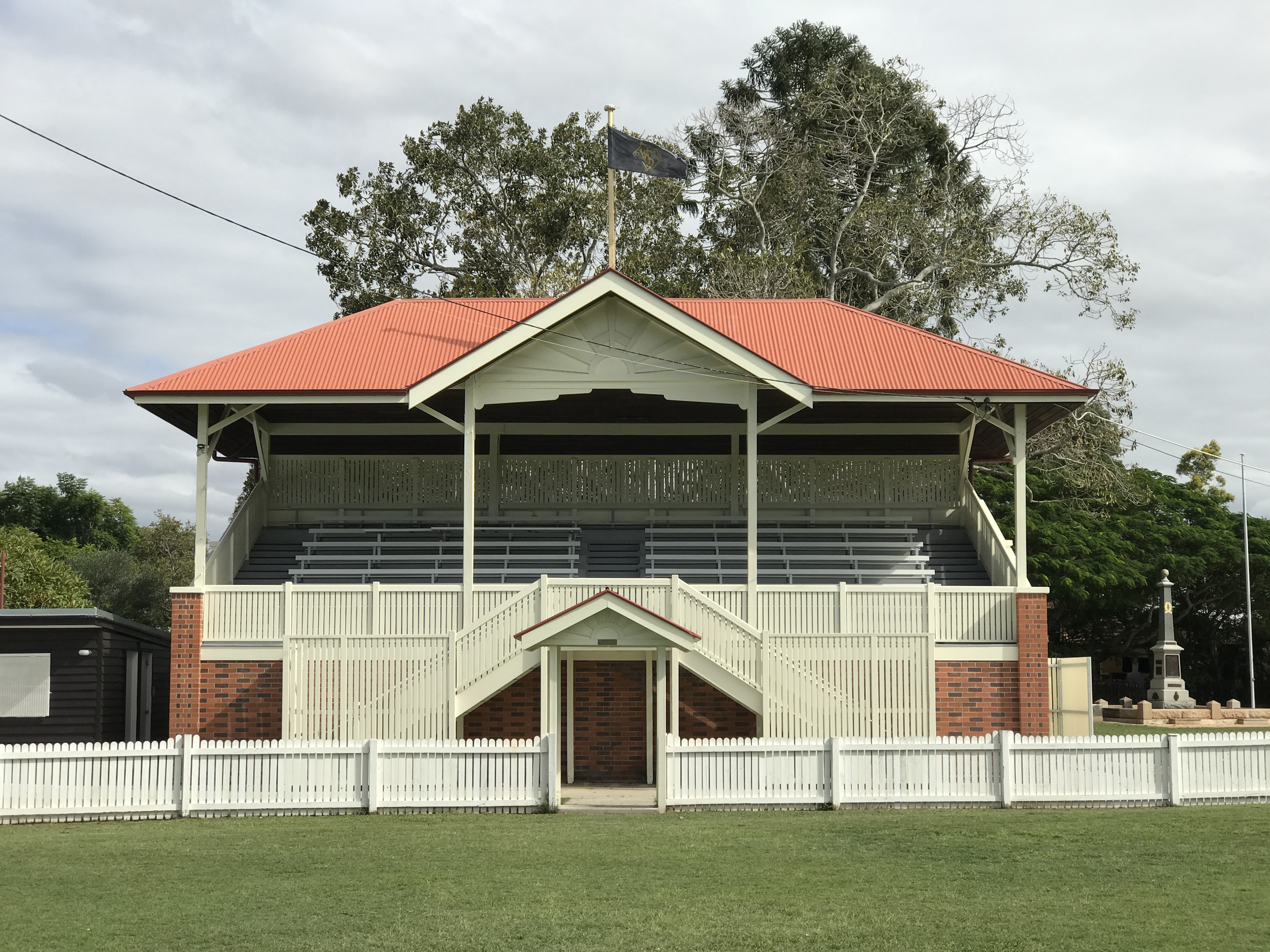
Stands for spectators, Graceville Memorial Park,

Graceville has a number of heritage-listed sites, including:

- 85 Bank Road: Beth-Eden
- 95 Bank Road: Glenrae
- 12 Churchill Street: Christ the King Roman Catholic Church (also known as St. Michael and the Holy Souls)
- 161 Graceville Avenue: 161 Graceville Avenue Graceville (also known as Koorong)
- 327 Honour Avenue: Central Buildings
- 335 Honour Avenue: Concrete Block Residence
- 17 Kew Road: 17 Kew Road Graceville (also known as Netherton)
- 110 Long Street: Graceville railway station
- 15 Magee Street: Brick War Service Home
- 27 Magee Street: Brick War Service Home
- 39 Magee Street: Brick War Service Home
- 9 Molonga Terrace: Glengarry
- 15 Molonga Terrace: The Gables
- 173 Oxley Road: Graceville Memorial Park
- 215 Oxley Road: Graceville Uniting Church (formerly Graceville Methodist Church)
- 8 Rakeevan Road: 8 Rakeevan Road, Graceville
- 11 Rakeevan Road: Bulk store
- 27 Strong Avenue: Brick War Service Home
- 51 Strong Avenue: Brick War Service Home
- 98 Strong Avenue: Anzac Cottage (also known as De Lesle)
- 196 Verney Road East: Roslin Villa
- 16 Young Street: Sherwood Scout Hall

== Education ==
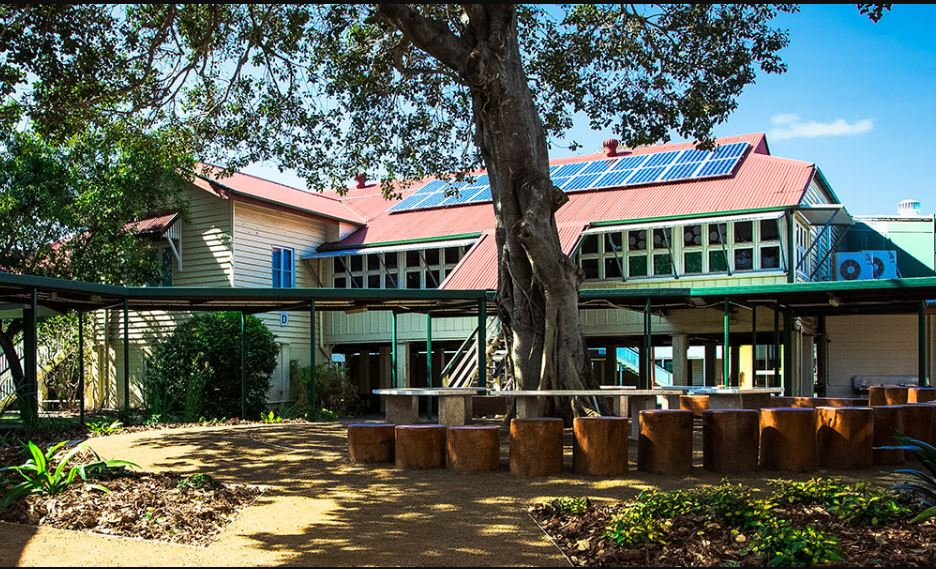
Graceville State School, 2023

Graceville State School is a government primary (Prep–6) school for boys and girls at 23 Acacia Avenue (27.5175°S 152.9787°E). In 2017, the school had an enrolment of 761 students with 58 teachers (44 full-time equivalent) and 18 non-teaching staff (14 full-time equivalent).

Christ the King School is a Catholic primary (Prep–6) school for boys and girls at 7 Randolph Street (27.5197°S 152.9774°E). In 2017, the school had an enrolment of 267 students with 23 teachers (16 full-time equivalent) and 15 non-teaching staff (8 full-time equivalent).

There are no secondary schools in Graceville. The nearest government secondary school are Corinda State High School in Corinda to the south and Indooroopilly State High School in Indooroopilly to the north.

== Amenities ==
There are two shopping precincts in the suburb:

- Graceville Riverside Village at 158 Graceville Avenue (27.5227°S 152.9882°E).
- Graceville Fiveways, at the intersection of Oxley Avenue, Long Street East and Park Terrace (27.5249°S 152.9810°E).
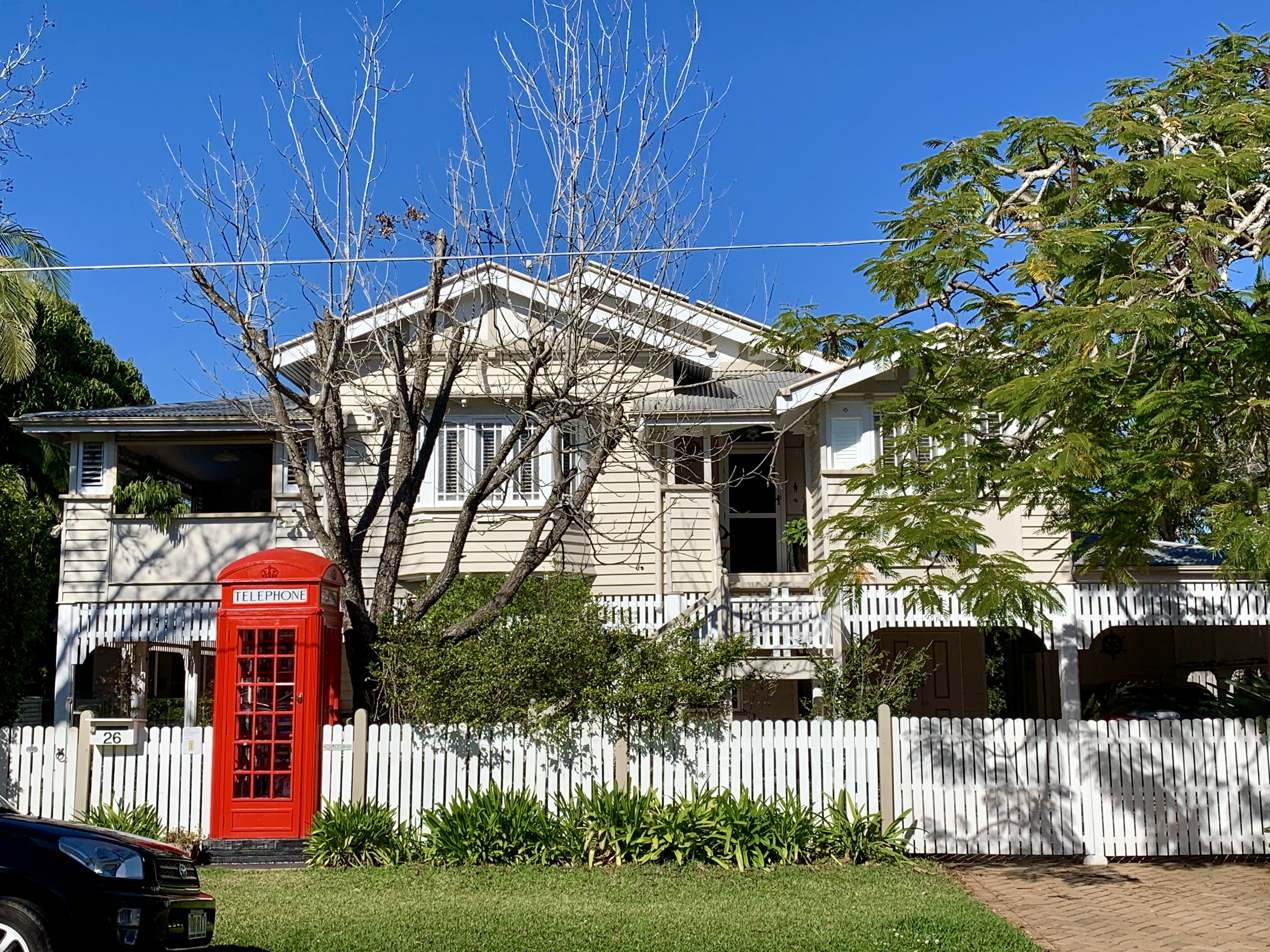
  Graceville's 'Street Library', housed in a red telephone booth

Graceville Uniting Church is at 215 Oxley Road (27.5206°S 152.9790°E). It is part of the South Moreton Presbytery of the Uniting Church in Australia.

Graceville Memorial Oval, which has the Memorial for the soldiers who died in wars that lived in the area, and also serves as the home of both Western Suburbs Cricket Club and Wests Taylor Bridge Rugby Club.

Graceville has a number of sporting clubs, including

- Graceville Croquet Club in Memorial Park at Appel Street (27.5179°S 152.9750°E)
- Souths Graceville Lions Rugby League Club
- South West United Hockey Club
- West Taylor Bridge Rugby Club
- Rangers Netball Club
- Western Suburbs Cricket Club
- Graceville Amateur Swimming Club, which is based at Graceville State School.
