= Walter Taylor (contractor) =

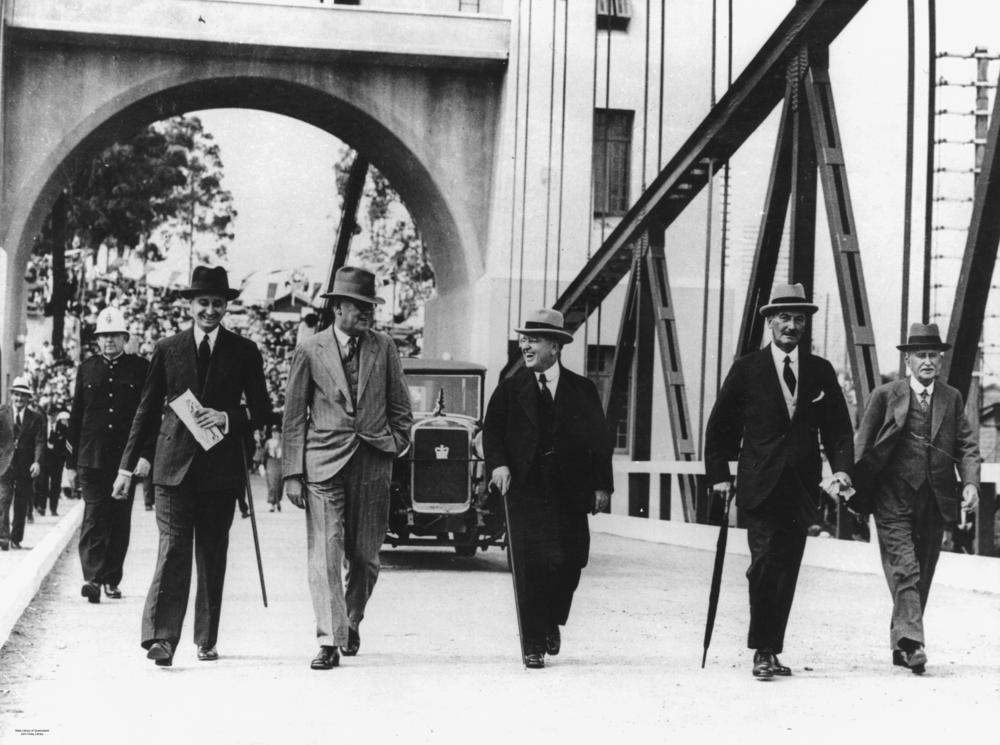
Walter Taylor (far right) at the opening of the Indooroopilly Toll Bridge (known from 1956 as the Walter Taylor Bridge), 14 February 1936

Walter Taylor (1872–1955) was an Australian contractor and builder of many Brisbane landmarks. His most notable works are the Walter Taylor Bridge and the Graceville Methodist church, both of which are heritage-listed buildings.

== Early life ==
Walter Taylor was born on 16 September 1872 in Sheffield, England, the third child of Walter Taylor (senior) and his wife Ann (née Naylor). In about 1882, the family immigrated to Brisbane, Queensland, Australia, where Walter (senior) took up work in the building trade, eventually setting up on his account as a contractor. The son Walter worked with his father and learned the construction industry on the job; he did not receive any formal training in architecture, construction or engineering. In 1899, his father Walter (senior) died in the Brisbane General Hospital, following an accident while building the engine sheds at Brisbane's Roma Street railway station. Despite being a busy contractor with many projects, the winding up of his father's estate over the following year revealed he was insolvent, leaving the family penniless. This experience had a profound effect on the young Walter.

Walter Taylor married Brisbane-born Louisa Johanna Elvina Charlotte Braun in 1900 and they had a daughter Thelma Henrietta Alvina in 1901. In 1902, Walter and his family sailed to England to gain more experience in the construction industry. They remained in England for 10 years, returning in 1912.

== Professional life ==
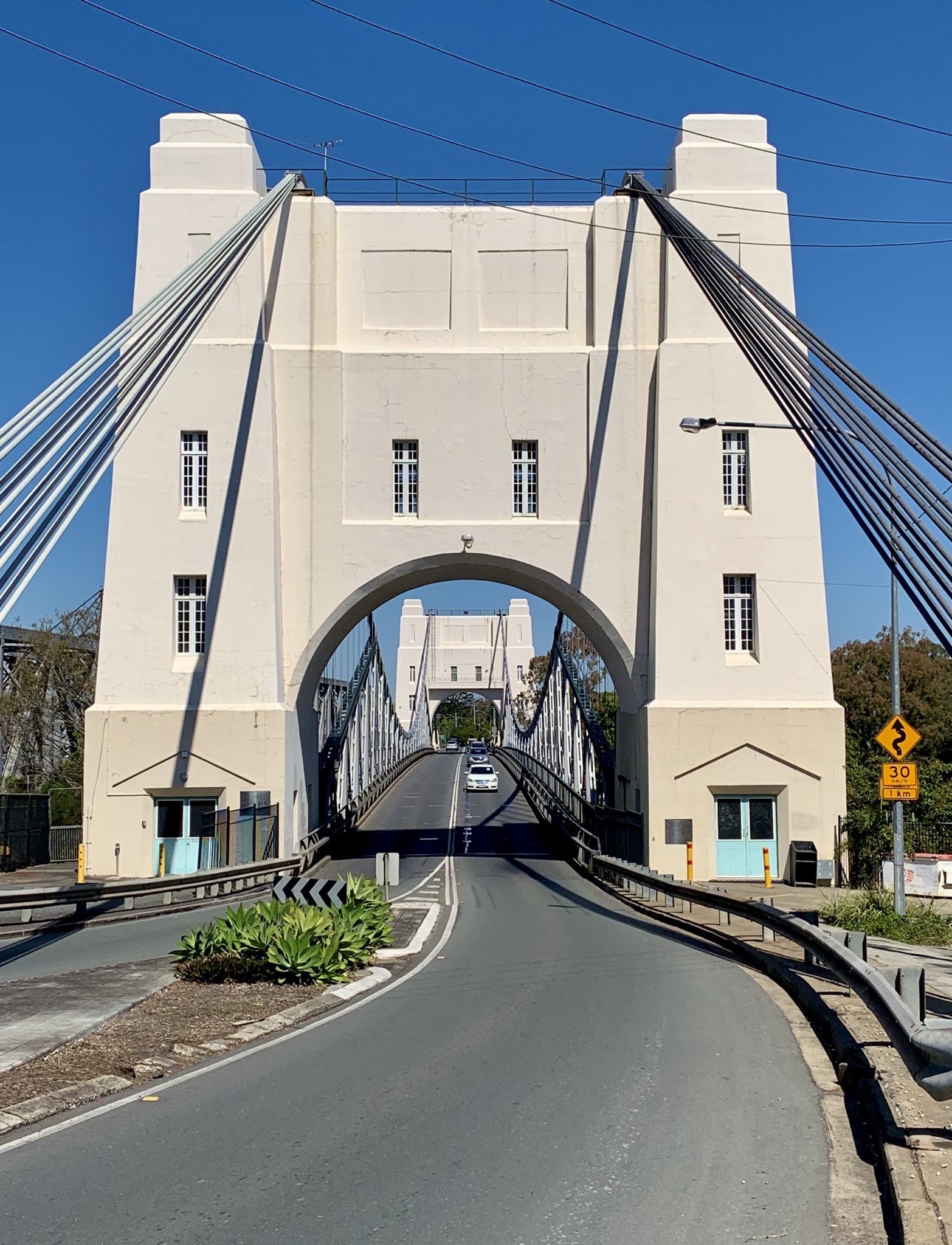
Walter Taylor Bridge (Indooroopilly Toll Bridge)

Between 1902 and 1912 in England, Walter Taylor was involved in the design and construction of fairground rides.

On returning to Brisbane in 1912, Walter Taylor established a successful contracting business. He was involved in the construction of many Brisbane buildings and other civil engineering works, such as bridges. Projects he worked on included:

- Brisbane Boys' College
- new block at the Royal Brisbane and Women's Hospital in 1928
- the RSL Club in Elizabeth Street, Brisbane
- the Boyne River bridge at Mundubbera in 1928
- the Barambah Creek bridge at Gayndah
- the Downfall Creek bridge on the Redcliffe Road near Aspley
- the swimming pool at Somerville House in 1923
- the Central Buildings on Honour Avenue in Graceville between Verney Road West and Rakeevan Road in 1924
- the Abbotsford Road Bridge (Albion Fiveways) in (Albion) in 1928
- extensions to the Church of England Grammar School (East Brisbane) in 1927

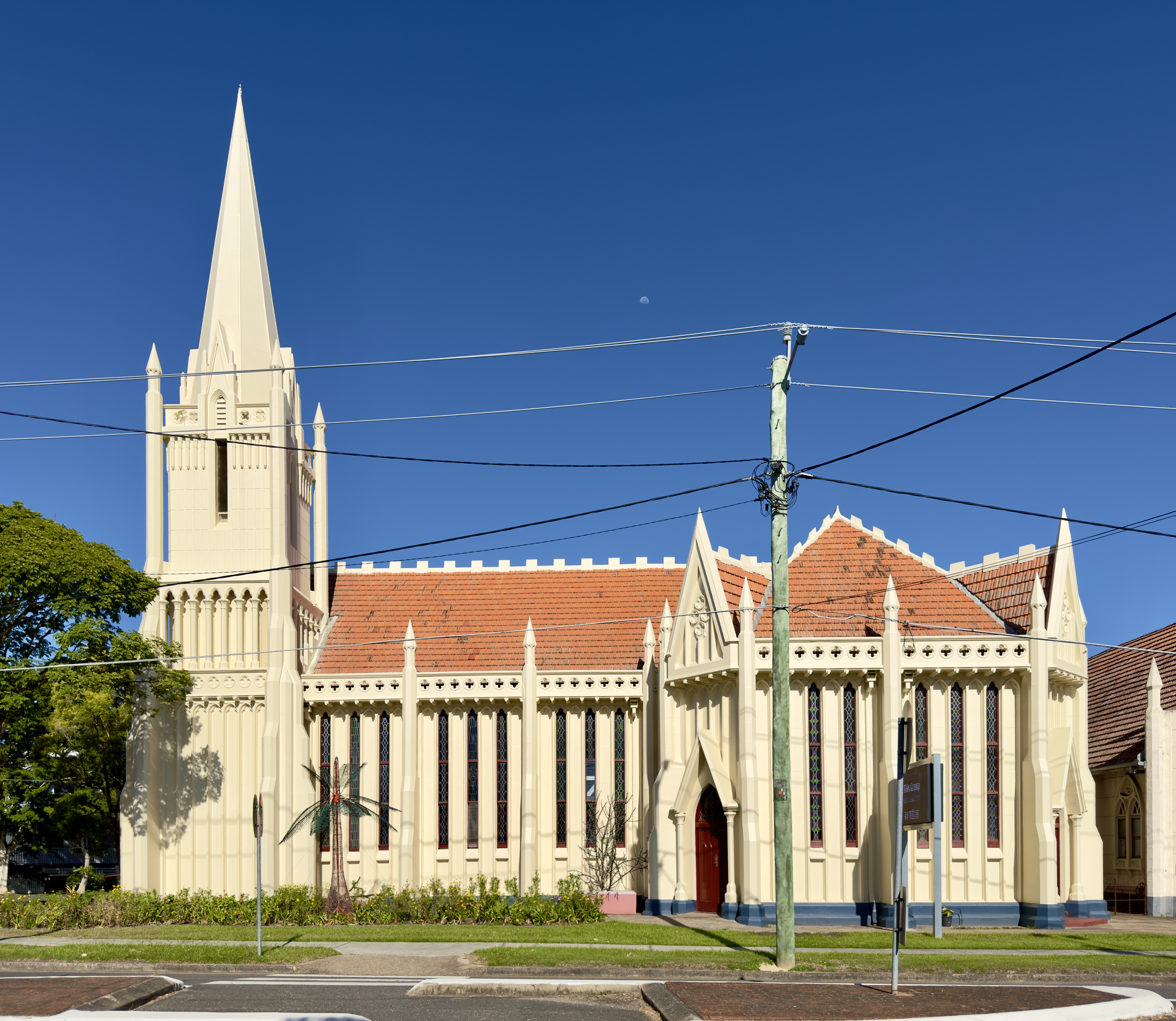
Graceville Uniting Church (formerly Graceville Methodist Church)

However, Walter Taylor was not content to simply build projects envisaged and designed by others. He was a man of great vision and believed that modern construction projects could bring significant benefit to Brisbane's citizens. He proposed a series of projects, many of which encountered considerable opposition politically and financially. Unlike his father, Walter was very financially savvy and often came up with innovative funding solutions for his proposed projects. For example, he door-knocked the suburbs of Chelmer and Graceville to sell subscriptions to fund the construction of the Indooroopilly Toll Bridge and then used the tolls charged to pay back the loans and the investors.

Projects that Walter Taylor proposed included:

- Graceville Methodist Church (completed, now heritage-listed)
- underground river tunnel from the Brisbane central business district to Woolloongabba (proposed 1924, but never built, although such a tunnel, the Clem Jones Tunnel, was built many years later in 2010)
- Indooroopilly Toll Bridge (opened on 14 February 1936, now the heritage-listed Walter Taylor Bridge)
- an underground parking station for the Brisbane central business district (proposed 1938, but never built, although a similar project, King George Square carpark, was built in the 1970s)

== Personal life ==
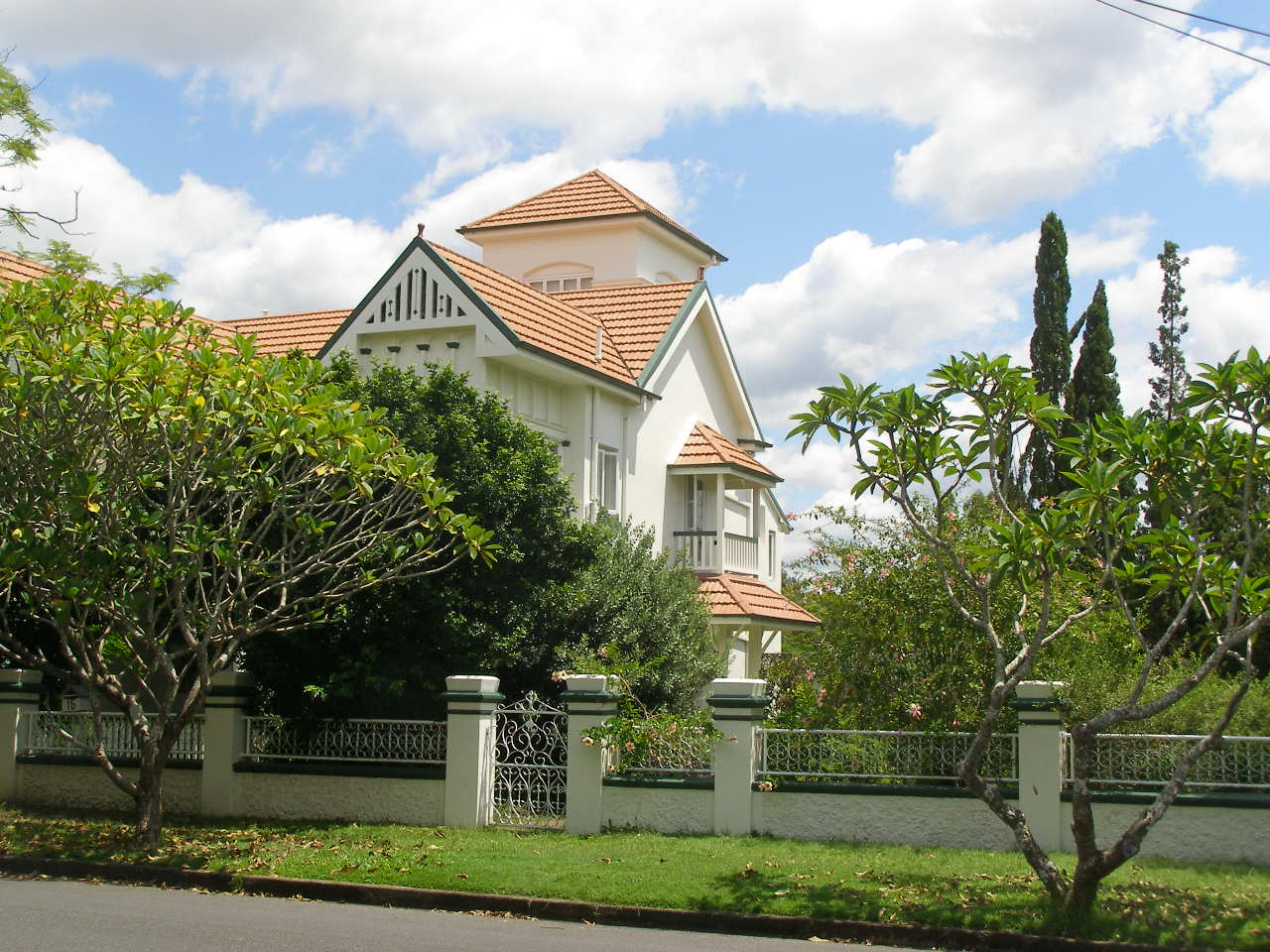
The Gables

As befitting a contractor, Walter Taylor constructed himself a fine home "The Gables" at 15 Molonga Drive, Graceville, and then in 1927 another fine home "Glenrae" on the Brisbane River at 95 Banks Street, Graceville, where he lived with his wife and daughter Thelma (until her marriage in 1928 to Victor Davis).

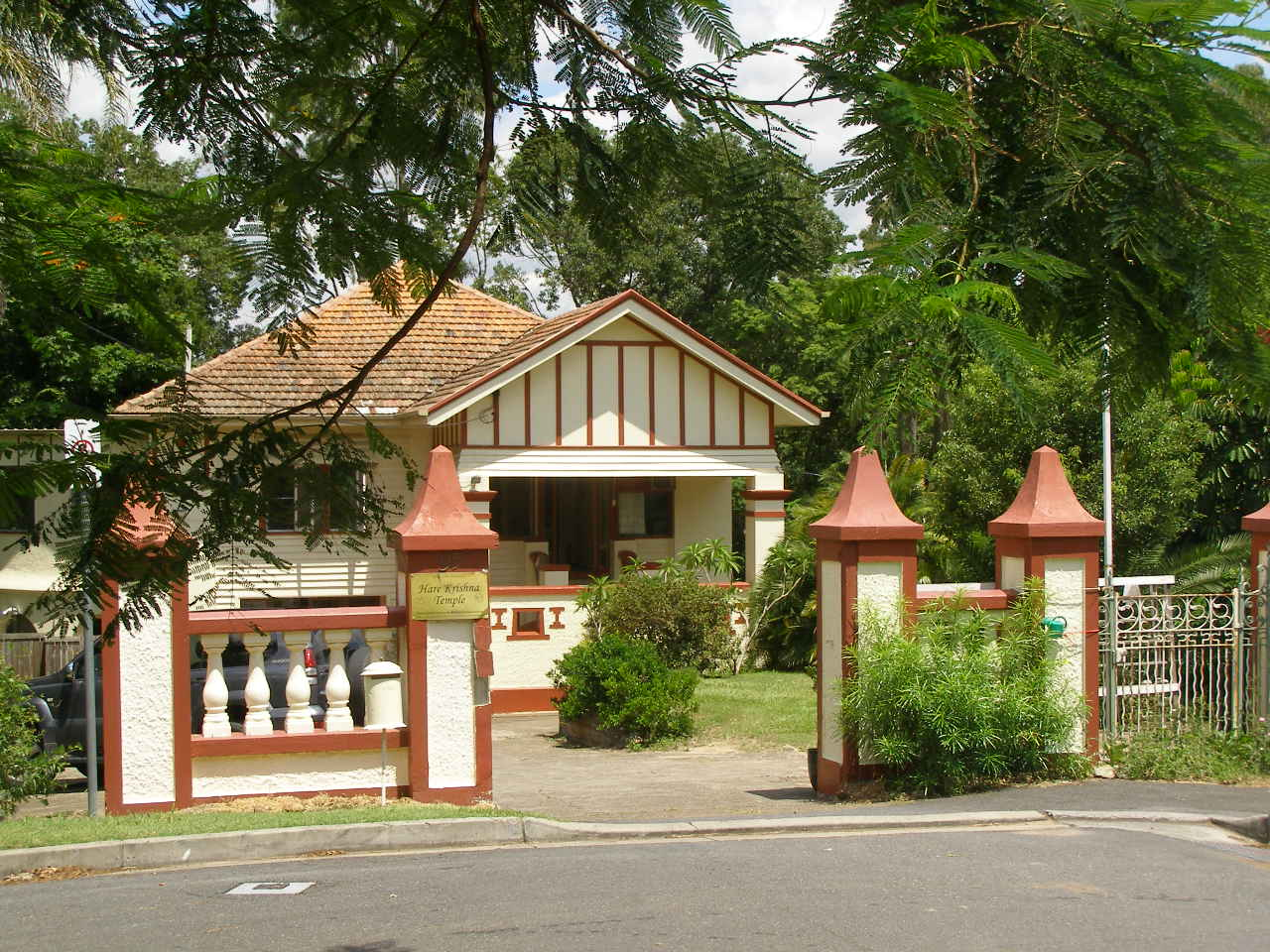
The house "Glenrae"

Walter Taylor was a devout Methodist and worshipped at the Sherwood Methodist church. His older brother Albert became a Methodist minister. Walter instigated, designed and built the Graceville Methodist Church in Oxley Road, Graceville, to serve the Graceville community of Methodists. It is often regarded as one of Brisbane's prettiest churches (and very popular for weddings). Walter and Louisa Taylor hosted many social occasions such as dances and garden parties in their home for the benefit of the church and its fund-raising. As the congregation had to borrow in order to build the Graceville Methodist Church, Walter Taylor's will provided funds to pay off the debt (following the death of his wife Louisa). His granddaughter Joan Davis was married in that Graceville Methodist Church, the service being conducted by her uncle Arthur Taylor. His grandson Noel Davis also became a church minister (and in 2011 published a book "The Remarkable Walter Taylor" about his grandfather).

Walter Taylor died in November 1955 and his wife Louisa in 1962.

== Honours ==
On 28 October 2011, Walter Taylor was posthumously the recipient of Queensland University of Technology's Distinguished Constructor Award and inducted into their Construction Hall of Fame.
