= Graceville Uniting Church =

Church in Brisbane, Australia (built 1917)

Graceville Uniting Church (former)
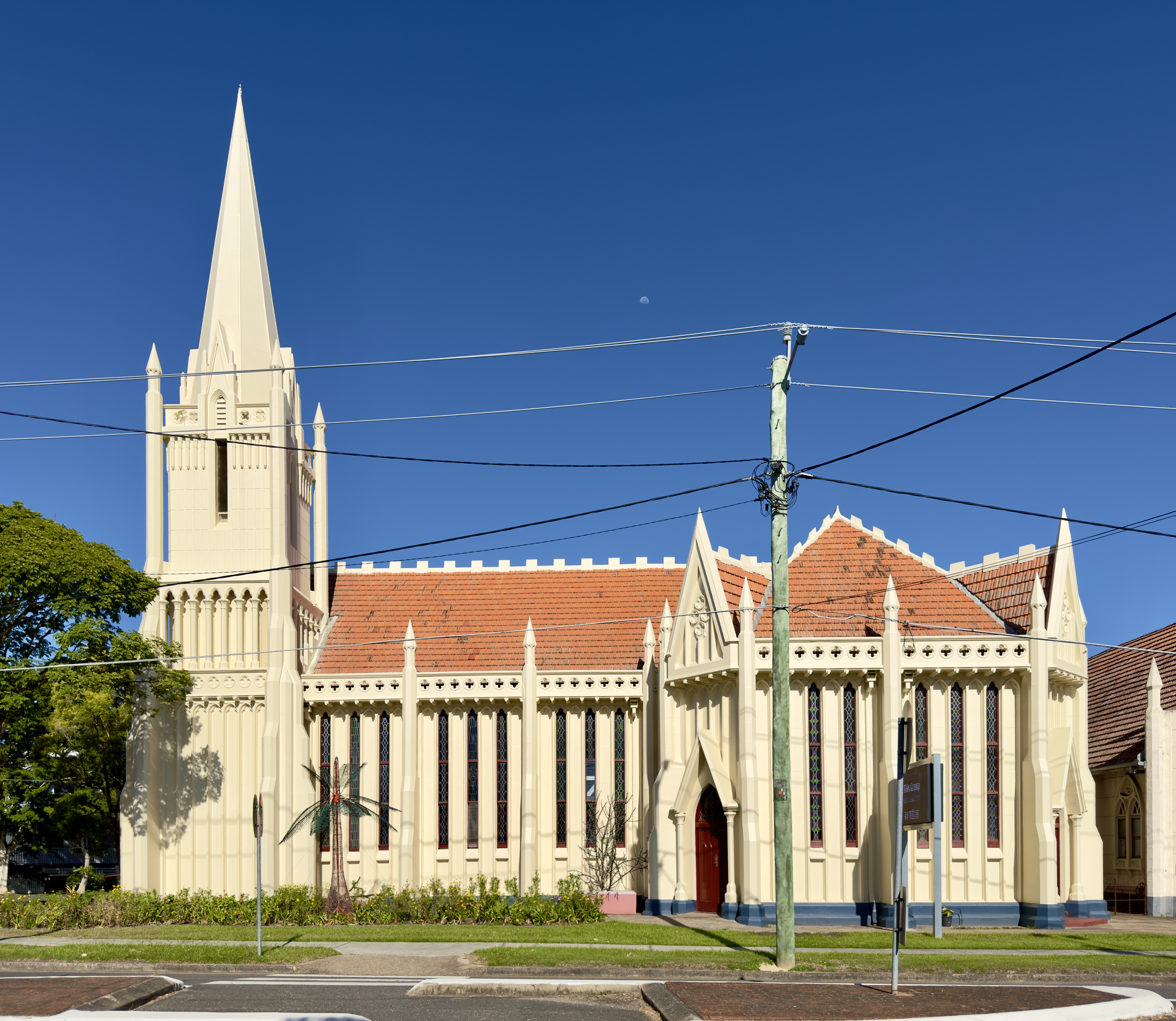
- Graceville Uniting Church, 2026
- Graceville Uniting Church (former)
- 27°31′14″S 152°58′44″E
- Address: 215 Oxley Road, Graceville, City of Brisbane, Queensland
- Country: Australia
- Previous denomination: Methodist (1917–1977); Uniting (1977–2022)
- Website: web.archive.org/web/20230302074922/https://www.gracevilleunitingchurch.com.au/

History
- Former name: Graceville Methodist Church
- Status: Church (1917–2022)
- Founded: 2 March 1929 (church)
- Founder: Rev. C. T. Palethorpe
- Dedicated: 29 November 1930 by Sir John Goodwin

Architecture
- Functional status: Closed
- Architect: Walter Taylor
- Architectural type: Church
- Style: Perpendicular Gothic
- Years built: 1917–1951 (complex)
- Closed: 27 March 2022

Specifications
- Materials: Concrete; terracotta tile roof

Administration
- Parish: Graceville

Queensland Heritage Register
- Official name: Graceville Uniting Church Complex; Graceville Methodist Church
- Type: State heritage (built, landscape)
- Designated: 24 September 1999
- Reference no.: 601584
- Significant period: Ongoing (social)
- Significant components: Tower – bell / belfry, kindergarten, views to, church, stained glass window/s, furniture/fittings, church hall/sunday school hall, trees/plantings, memorial – honour board/ roll of honour, kitchen/kitchen house, hall
- Builders: Walter Taylor

Graceville Uniting Church is a heritage-listed former Uniting church at 215 Oxley Road, Graceville, City of Brisbane, Queensland, Australia. It was designed and built by Walter Taylor from 1917 to 1951. It was previously known as Graceville Methodist Church. The associated churchyard complex was added to the Queensland Heritage Register on 24 September 1999.

The church closed on 27 March 2022.

== History ==
The Graceville Uniting Church complex consists of the original church hall, erected in 1917; the former church, opened in 1930 and closed in 2022; and the memorial hall, opened in 1951, all to the design of Walter Taylor. Repairs were made to the buildings from the mid-1950s onwards, with a jubilee restoration project to restore the church and memorial hall completed in 1965.

The former Graceville Uniting Church, established as Graceville Methodist Church, was originally part of the Sherwood circuit. In August 1914, it was deemed advisable to start a Sunday School in Graceville. The Sunday School was given the use of sheds on the Graceville recreation grounds, however, by 1917 the Sunday School had outgrown this accommodation. In January 1917, Messrs Taylor, Draper and Hedges were appointed to a committee to investigate a possible site for additional accommodation. Verney Road, east of Graceville railway station, was selected as the most central and appropriate site. Within a few days, Mr Taylor was approached by Mr Keid regarding eight allotments in Addison, Verney and Oxley Roads which were for sale for £135. Taylor paid a deposit of £10 to secure the property. In February 1917, the church decided to purchase three blocks – Allotments 299, 300 and 301 for £60, purchasing the other five allotments two years later for £75. The land was registered on 22 August 1917 as the property of the Methodist Church, with four nominated trustees. The new trustees agreed to secure a loan of £125 to build a new hall on the site. Taylor was appointed Honorary Architect and supervisor of the project and it was agreed that the hall was to be built by voluntary labour.

=== Church hall ===
The new hall was opened on 3 November 1917 by the President of the Methodist Conference, Rev. W. Brown. Its construction was the result of community effort, built with the donation of various materials and voluntary labour. Taylor was heavily involved in the project – he drew the plans, prepared the specifications and supervised the work. The hall had the seating capacity of 120 people. While built for the Sunday School, the hall was also used for Sunday evening services, and for community events, such as community meetings, debating and concerts. At the end of 1917, the Graceville congregation became a separate entity from the Sherwood congregation. The Sunday School continued to grow, prompting a request for Taylor to prepare plans of an extension to the hall. Taylor volunteered to supervise the construction of the extensions and they were completed by his staff by 4 February 1924.

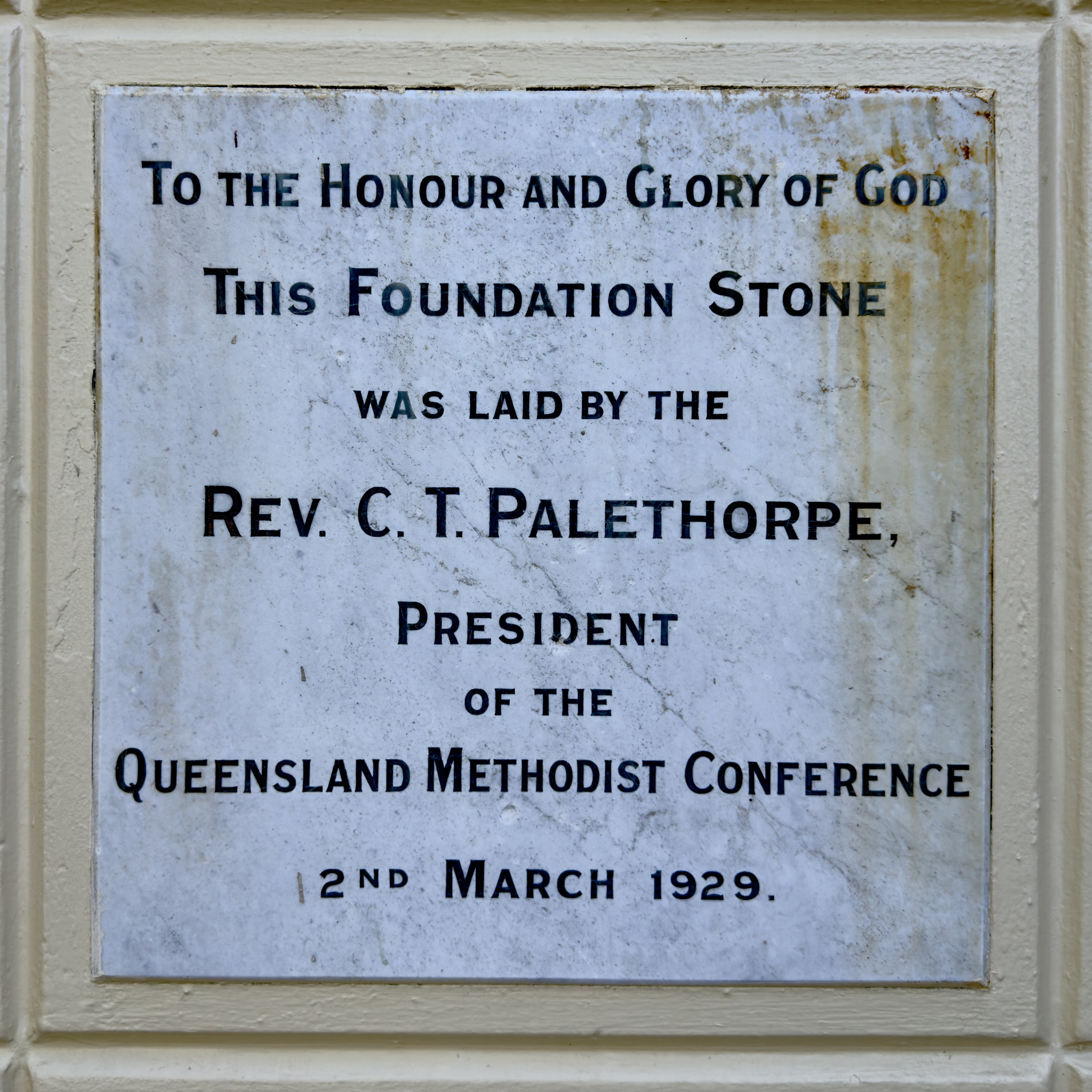
Foundation stone laid in 1929

=== Former church ===
In 1928, the Church Trustees empowered Walter Taylor to devise plans for a new church on the corner of Verney and Oxley Roads. The foundation stone was laid on Saturday 2 March 1929 at a ceremony presided over by the President of the Queensland Methodist Conference, Rev. C. T. Palethorpe. Like the hall, the construction of the former church was a community effort, with the donation of labour, cash and much of the construction material including filling, fencing, concrete foundations, reinforcing steel, bearers, floor joists, timber for roof construction and cathedral glass for windows. The congregation had intended to complete the superstructure of the former church without borrowing any money, however the economics of the time were against them. Being the time of the Depression, many of the men of the parish were unemployed, on relief work, and so were unable to give money as generously as they had done in the past. £500 was borrowed from the Methodist Loan Fund.

The former church was opened by His Excellency the Governor of Queensland, Sir John Goodwin, on 29 November 1930. Tribute was paid to the architect and builder of the former church, Walter Taylor, with the congregation's appreciation expressed in the erection of a marble slab and framed photographs of Walter and Louisa Taylor in the former church.

According to the Queensland Methodist Times, the use of the Perpendicular Gothic style was an innovation in Methodist architecture. The precast concrete parts were made in Walter Taylor's workshop, moved to the site and "placed in position like masonry. They were laced together with steel and concrete providing a building of extraordinary strength, without in any way detracting from the gracefulness of design". After the buttresses were erected, walls, panels and window jambs at the top and filled in with concrete slabs, formed a broken surface, "with a very pleasing effect". A parapet with a counterfoil design was mounted on top of the walls between the buttresses, and was broken by a pointed turret over each buttress. "Rapid hardening cement and reinforced concrete have made it possible to construct on a very modest scale a building containing all the essential features".

Cruciform in plan, the former church was symbolic in its representation of part of the Scriptures – a parable in stone. The exterior walls were to be constructed from 33 buttresses which represent the 33 years of Christ's life on earth. The walls between the buttresses were divided into seven – the perfect number in the Bible. There are three windows in each bay – a trinity of light. The building featured 1450 Gothic arches and 8000 panes of tinted Cathedral glass.

In November 1937, two trees were given to the former church by Mrs Taylor and planted in the church grounds. Various other additions were made to the former church, including a photograph frame containing pictures of past ministers, a baptismal font, a pulpit, and a memorial plaque to commemorate Brother James William Roberts.

=== Memorial hall ===
At a Trustees Meeting on 15 November 1944, a letter from Taylor was read which stated that the time was opportune to launch a scheme to build a memorial hall and to simultaneously pay off the church debt. Plans proposed by Taylor were presented to the meeting and the committee agreed to go ahead with the construction of the hall which would be a memorial to those who served in World War II and would be used by the Sunday School and church societies.

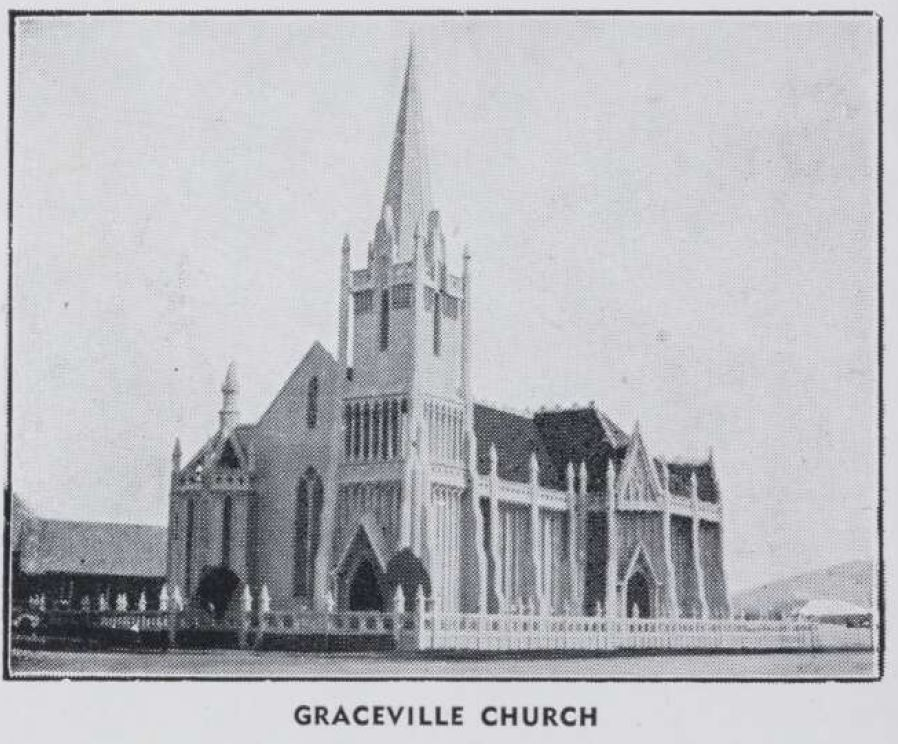
Graceville Methodist Church, c. 1947.

The foundation stone of the memorial hall was laid on 20 September 1947 by Mr W.H. Green. Taylor recommended that the front and side fence of the church be removed. The good portions were re-erected at the side of the hall and the broken pieces were used in the foundations. After delays caused by shortages of materials and Bureau of Industry concerns, the memorial hall was officially opened on 1 December 1951. Apart from the honour board remembering those who fell in World War II, the memorial also contained many tributes to former church members.

=== Site modifications ===
From the 1950s, various renovations and modifications were carried out on the former Graceville Methodist Church. In 1955 repairs were needed to the former church floor and to the roof, and in November 1956 the vestry roof and floor of the tower were resurfaced. A new concrete sump was placed under the former church and an automatic electric pump to remove water from the sump was installed. A 1957 report by architects Cook and Kerrison, found the former church in serious need of repair. It was agreed to allow Cook and Kerrison to proceed with preparing specifications for renewing the floor and box guttering. The trustees approved that the church floor should be concrete with a suitable covering. The £1972 tender of A. L. Paice was accepted. To complete the work, the existing pulpit and communion rail were removed and later re-installed to one side. In 1958 a new septic toilet block was constructed and a new memorial window was unveiled in the former church. A new organ was donated in 1959. The interior of the former church was also repainted by Ash and Nephew, and Brisbane Lead Light Service repaired and installed various windows. In 1960 new stairs from the Minister's Vestry to the choir stalls were constructed, and in 1962 a new pulpit chair was installed.

In about March 1962 Louisa Taylor died and in accordance with the will of Walter Taylor the overdraft and the balance owed to the Methodist Loan Fund were liquidated. The two large windows at the Verney Road end of the church were dedicated as memorial windows to Mr and Mrs Taylor.

In 1963 the original Trustee committee was replaced by the Property Board of Graceville Methodist Church who selected the restoration of the former church and memorial hall as its jubilee project. The most important issues were the spalling of the concrete in the hall and church owing to the penetration of moisture which caused the steel reinforcing to rust, and damage and disfigurement caused by pigeon droppings. The restoration work was completed in 1965 by Building Plastics. The project involved cutting out loose concrete where spalling was evident, cleaning, treating the steel reinforcement and repairing the concrete. All loose paint and moss was removed, anti-mould solution was applied, a sealer coat was added as well as a coat of bitumen and woven fibreglass cloth was used to cover all the cracks and repairs. Finally two more coats of bitumen, two colour coats and two coats of clear plastic were applied. The new colour chosen was beige. In 1965 the tennis courts were also improved and the retired men of the parish gave up their Friday afternoons to improve the church grounds.

Throughout the late 1960s, several other additions and improvements were made. New carpet and linoleum was laid, three of the former church windows were replaced, the church was rewired, lighting in the choir lofts was added and a beam under the Vestry floor was strengthened. A new organ was purchased, a memorial side pulpit was built, and three memorial chairs and a carved timber flower stand was installed. In the 1970s the hall was renovated as were the two tennis courts. In 1980 the choir vestry floor was repaired and tiled, and the tiles in the former church were also cleaned. A concrete ramp to facilitate wheelchair access was installed, new stainless steel guttering was added to the former church roof, and the old hall was renovated.

After the formation of the Uniting Church in 1977, the Graceville Parish remained a part of the Sherwood Parish until 1988. From 1988 until its closure in 2022, Graceville was a separate Uniting Church parish.

== Description ==
The former Graceville Uniting Church and Memorial Hall are sited on a block bounded by Oxley Road, Verney Road East and Addison Road. In addition to the former church and hall, the site also contains the original timber church hall and tennis courts. Plantings exist along the Oxley Road elevation of the former church.

=== The church ===
The rendered concrete building is a modestly sized church (nave approximately 15 by 10 metres (49 by 33 ft)) laid out with a T-shaped plan (St Anthony's cross) comprising a central nave, transepts and choir. The design of the building, like the adjacent hall, is influenced by an Inter-War Gothic style of architecture.

The front elevation of the former church faces Verney Road East and comprises the gabled end of the former church, flanked by a projecting octagonal vestry to the west and a projecting tower to the east. The elevation is asymmetrical with the tower dominating. The centre of the gabled end houses a large pointed arched window opening. Located above this is a lancet opening infilled with fixed louvred panels.

The octagonal vestry abuts the western side of the front facade. Supporting the vestry walls are six buttresses, each capped with a pinnacle. Between the buttresses are precast concrete panels with foiled heads. The central panel is infilled with leaded glass. The vestry roof has a central, raised pinnacle which also forms one end of the gable of the nave.

The bell tower, located on the Oxley Road side of the front elevation, is square in plan and capped with an eight-sided spire. The structure is supported by buttresses on the three external corners. The main doors to the former church are located in the base of the bell tower. These are accessed via an arched opening on the southern side of the bell tower. This opening is surmounted by a decorative gable supported by paired columns on either side of the door. A ramp leads up to this opening where it is met by decorative timber gates. Tesselated tiles cover the floor of the bell tower. The doors to the former church lie at right-angles to the arched opening and gates. Above the doorway on the ground floor are precast concrete panels with foiled heads, surmounted by a horizontal panel with recessed quatrefoil motif. Above this panel are chamfered columns supporting a foiled arcade. Above this is an area of pre-cast concrete tiled, centrally located on which is a lancet window. Surmounting the tower is an eight-side concrete spire.

The side walls of the former church consist of a series of reinforced concrete buttresses surmounted by pinnacles. Between these buttresses are infill panels of pre-cast concrete which typically contain three leaded glass lancet windows per panel. These panels are surmounted by pre-cast concrete spandrels featuring a quatrefoil motif.

The transepts lie on the northern end of the building. External access to this portion of the former church is via double doors on the truncated corners of both transepts. A six-panelled leaded window is located above each double door. All entrances to the former church are flanked by columns either side which support a decorative gable.

The steeply pitched roof of the former church is clad with Wunderlich terracotta tiles. Along the ridge of the roof is a concrete crenellated ridge capping.

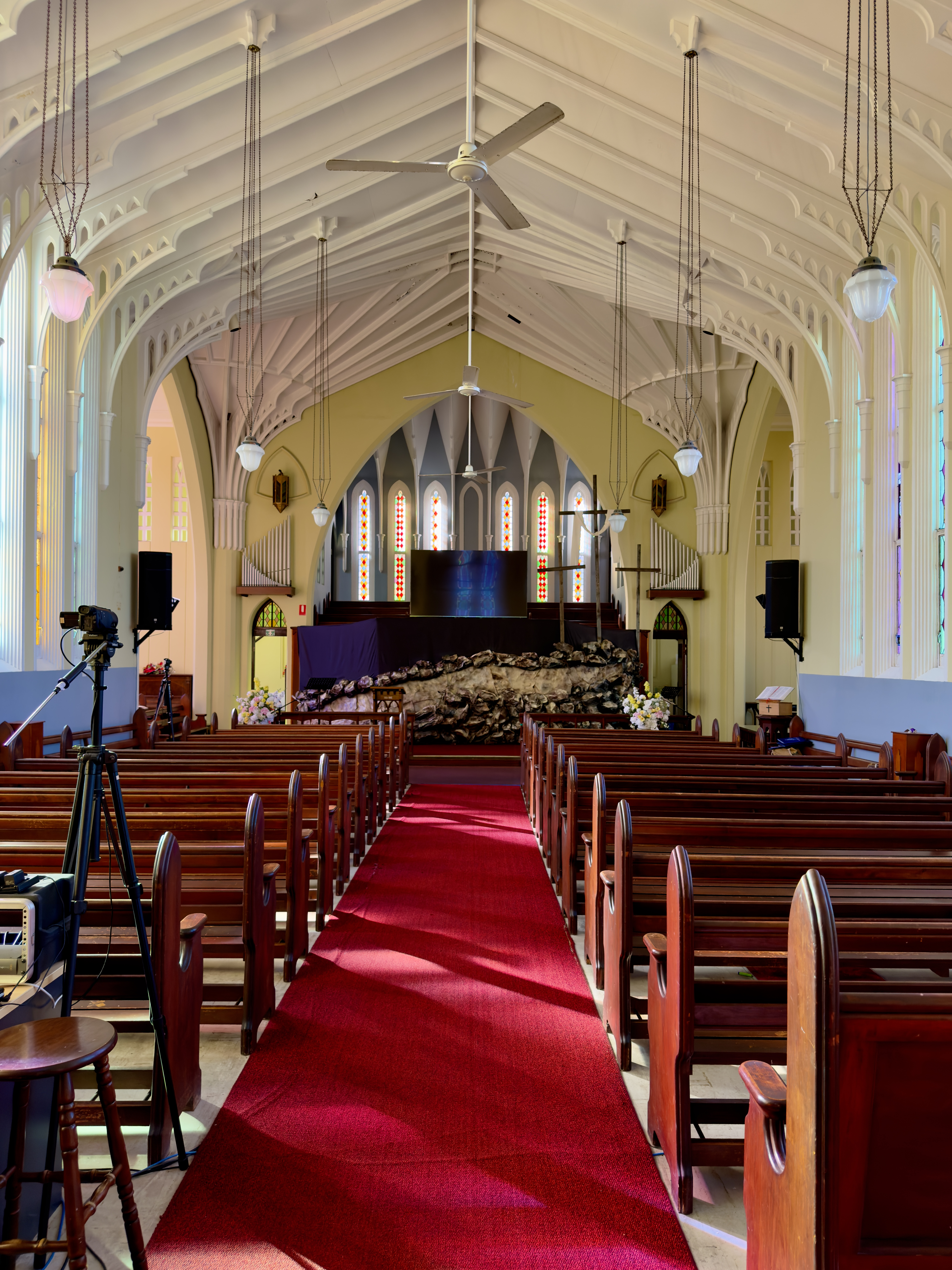
The nave is divided by a centre aisle with original pews on either side

Internally, the nave is divided by a central aisle with original timber pews either side. Various memorials are located on the walls and in the leaded windows of the nave, including the windows on the southern wall of the former church dedicated to Louisa and Walter Taylor.

The transepts are divided internally to form vestries. The southern portions of both transepts are integrated with the body of the church and contain pews, and a pipe organ is located in the eastern transept. The vestries contain stair access to the choir stalls.

The vestry located on the south-western corner of the church contains a ladder and doorway which provide access to the bell tower and spire.

The pulpit area is surrounded by a communion rail. Access to the pulpit is gained via a set of stairs which continue behind the pulpit to the tiered choir stalls.

The rendered concrete ceiling is suspended below timber roofing members and incorporates simplified Gothic-style tracery and V-shaped coffers.

The former church main floor is a raked concrete slab on ground, however timber flooring survives to the elevated choir.

Internal joinery is generally silky oak including an altered choir front and pulpit.

=== The memorial hall ===
The memorial hall is related in style and detailing to the church but is more restrained in its use of the Gothic style. It is also similar in construction to the church, although the hall employs slightly different pre-cast concrete units for the walls.

The main roof is a steeply pitched timber-framed roof clad in Wunderlich terracotta tiles. A small gable roofed porch abuts the Oxley Road elevation of the building.

The hall is essentially a single large space with a mezzanine at the Oxley Road end. At the opposite end is a stage. Located to either side of the stage is a set of stairs and a doorway providing access to the stage. A kitchen and large kindergarten room forming the L-shaped plan are also located at his end of the hall. The kindergarten lies on the northern side of the stage area. Access to this room is via the stage and an external door in the south-eastern corner of the room. The floor of the kindergarten room is at the same height as the stage.

The front porch area contains World War II memorial elements, including memorial plaques and recent memorial stained glass windows. The windows lie either side of the main entry doors. A door in the southern wall of the hall provides access from the rear of the church directly into the main room of the hall. Windows are typically paired tracery windows with timber sashes. The main floor is timber-framed with a part-basement space underneath.

New brick toilets infill between the rear of the hall and tennis shelter shed.

=== The original hall ===
The original hall is sited west of the Memorial Hall. It is a timber construction with sash windows, a central gabled projection and a corrugated iron hipped roof. The hall is currently used as part of the tennis court complex.

== Heritage listing ==
The former Graceville Uniting Church Complex was listed on the Queensland Heritage Register on 24 September 1999 having satisfied the following criteria.

The place is important in demonstrating the evolution or pattern of Queensland's history.

The former church and hall are significant as good representative examples of the Inter-War Gothic Style of architecture. The former church and hall are important for their aesthetic and architectural significance as well composed, unusual buildings and as important landmark elements of the streetscape. In particular, the church tower and spire is dominant in the streetscape and provides a local landmark.

The method of construction used on both the church and the hall was radically different to conventional construction techniques of the time, and as such demonstrate a high degree of technical achievement in the early use of pre-cast concrete in Queensland.

Until its 2022 closure, the former church and the hall were in continuous use providing for the spiritual, recreational and social needs of the Graceville Community, creating a strong and special association with the site. The former church and hall are significant for their strong association with prominent builder, Walter Taylor, who designed the buildings, devised their unusual construction method and supervised their construction. Taylor was also a major financial contributor to the construction of the complex, and included expressions of his faith in the design and layout of the former church in which he worshipped for many years. Taylor was a major building contractor in Brisbane, known particularly for his reinforced concrete buildings and structures. His most famous work was the Walter Taylor Bridge, constructed in 1935 as a toll bridge over the Brisbane River at Indooroopilly.

The place is important in demonstrating the principal characteristics of a particular class of cultural places.

The former church and hall are significant as good representative examples of the Inter-War Gothic Style of architecture.

The place is important because of its aesthetic significance.

The former church and hall are important for their aesthetic and architectural significance as well composed, unusual buildings and as important landmark elements of the streetscape. In particular, the church tower and spire is dominant in the streetscape and provides a local landmark.

The place is important in demonstrating a high degree of creative or technical achievement at a particular period.

The method of construction used on both the former church and the hall was radically different to conventional construction techniques of the time, and as such demonstrate a high degree of technical achievement in the early use of pre-cast concrete in Queensland.

The place has a strong or special association with a particular community or cultural group for social, cultural or spiritual reasons.

Until its 2022 closure, the former church and the hall were in continuous use providing for the spiritual, recreational and social needs of the Graceville Community, creating a strong and special association with the site.

The place has a special association with the life or work of a particular person, group or organisation of importance in Queensland's history.

The former church and hall are significant for their strong association with prominent builder, Walter Taylor, who designed the buildings, devised their unusual construction method and supervised their construction. Taylor was also a major financial contributor to the construction of the complex, and included expressions of his faith in the design and layout of the church in which he worshipped for many years. Taylor was a major building contractor in Brisbane, known particularly for his reinforced concrete buildings and structures. His most famous work was the Walter Taylor Bridge, constructed in 1935 as a toll bridge over the Brisbane River at Indooroopilly.
