= Graceville Memorial Park =

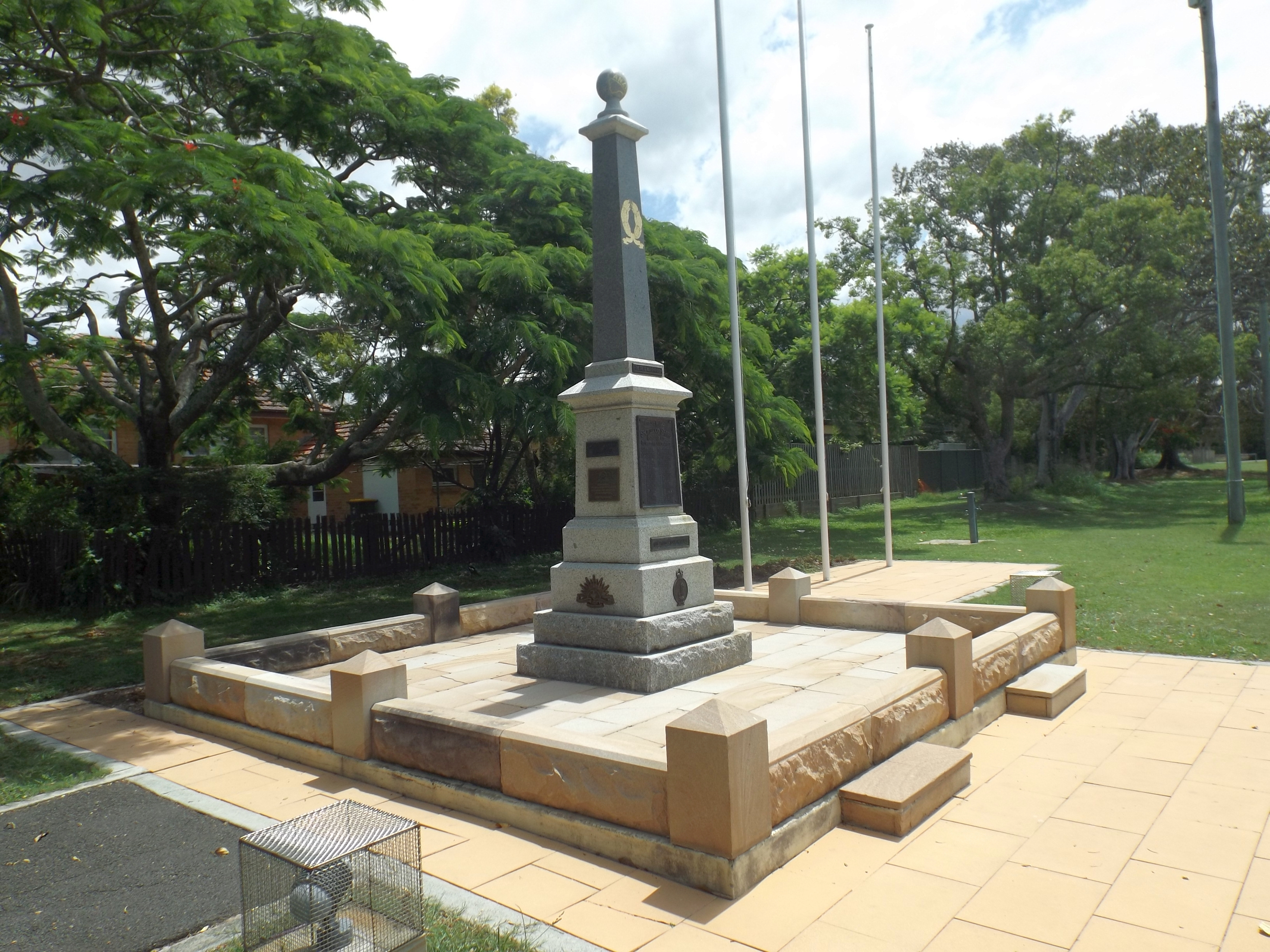
- War memorial, 2014

- Location within Queensland Location within Australia
- 27.5176°S 152.9765°E
- Location: 173 Oxley Road, Graceville, City of Brisbane, Queensland, Australia

History
- Design period: 1900–1914 (early 20th century)
- Built: 1904

Queensland Heritage Register
- Official name: Graceville Memorial Park, Graceville Recreation Reserve
- Type: state heritage (built, landscape)
- Designated: 5 September 2006
- Reference no.: 602443
- Significant period: 1904–1950s (fabric, historical); 1904– (social)
- Significant components: staircase/stairs – divided, sports field/oval/playing field, memorial – column, memorial – tree/avenue of trees, basement / sub-floor, croquet lawn, memorial – drive/road, grandstand, machinery/plant/equipment – transport – road, clubroom/s / clubhouse, flagpole/flagstaff

Graceville Memorial Park is a heritage-listed park at 173 Oxley Road, Graceville, City of Brisbane, Queensland, Australia. It was established in 1904. It is also known as Graceville Recreation Reserve and the Sherwood War Memorial. It was added to the Queensland Heritage Register on 5 September 2006.

== History ==
Graceville Memorial Park, located on a flat, low-lying part of Graceville, was gazetted as the Graceville Recreation Reserve in 1904, but it was referred to as Graceville Memorial Park by 1926. The park was enlarged in July 1979, with the resumption of about 11 perches (280 m^{2}) of vacant, ownerless land (lot 2, RP 70795) for an access way to Churchill Street, south of the park.

From 1840 to 1859 the peninsula that includes the suburb of Graceville was known as Boyland's Pocket, a run for sheep and cattle. After 1859 the area was subdivided into farms with an average size of about 30 to 40 acres (12 to 16 ha). Maize, potatoes, and bananas were grown, cotton was attempted in the 1860s, and sugar cane was produced until a cold spell in the 1870s. The area was relatively isolated from Brisbane until the railway line from Ipswich crossed the river from Chelmer to Indooroopilly in 1875. Graceville's subdivision for residential housing started during the building boom of the 1880s, and the Graceville railway station was opened in 1886. The Shire of Sherwood was created in 1891, excised from the Yeerongpilly Division (created in 1879).

From the late 1880s onwards there was an increased interest in Queensland in healthy outdoor recreation, and the flood-prone grassland on which the park was later sited was used as a lacrosse field in the 1890s. The formation of sporting clubs in Queensland led to pressure on local councils to provide facilities, and in May 1904 fourteen acres of this grassland was gazetted as the Graceville Recreation Reserve by the Queensland government. The reserve was vested in the Sherwood Shire Council, to be held in trust for recreation purposes, and the park's primary role since then has been as a leased venue for various team sports, mainly cricket and hockey, but also including soccer, rugby league, and Australian Rules football. A croquet club and a tennis club were also established. Other users included the Graceville Methodist Sunday School, which held classes in a ground shed on the reserve between November 1914 and November 1917, and a bridge club, which was formed at the croquet club premises around 1929. Aviators may have also used the park as an aerodrome in the 1920s.

The outpouring of grief in Australia that accompanied the deaths, and overseas burial, of 60,000 service people in World War I, led to a period of memorial building across the nation. A memorial was unveiled in Graceville Recreational Reserve on 28 November 1920 by Lieutenant E.M. Little, chairman of the local R.S.S.A.L.I.A. Funded by public subscriptions, the memorial was designed by Mr I Bennet, and was erected by Andrew Lang Petrie Monumental Works, at a cost of £225. On a copper scroll made by Ernest Gunderson, 51 soldiers and one nursing sister were included in a list of Sherwood Shire's fallen. 265 men, and seven nurses had enlisted from the Shire. Between 1985 and 1996, a low sandstone wall was built around the monument, and three flagpoles were set to the west. Plaques representing each of the three armed services have also been added to the north, east and west sides of the monument since 1985. In 2004 sandstone pavers replaced the bitumen that had been laid around the monument.

Before the unveiling of the memorial, 52 memorial trees were also planted. Bunya pines and cotton trees were set in a single row along Plumridge Street and Appel Street (then called Graceville Parade) to commemorate the dead. Today, 29 bunya pines and 11 cotton trees remain. Some locals claim that there were memorial plaques on these trees, but that the plaques had gone by the 1950s. In addition to the memorial trees on the western and northern edges of the park, an avenue of bauhinias, cabbage tree palms and Chinese elms was planted either side of a drive from Oxley Road to the memorial. A single line of figs and camphor laurels continued west from the memorial towards Appel Street. The eastern section of the drive had a bitumen surface by 1961, but the western section of the memorial drive, from the memorial to Appel Street, has reverted to grass. A trophy field gun captured by the Australian Imperial Force near Abancourt, France, in August 1918 was also sited near the memorial from the early 1920s, but it was removed before 1952.

In 1925 the Sherwood Shire was incorporated in the City of Greater Brisbane, and the recreation reserve is referred to as Graceville Memorial Park in the 1926 Park Schedule for the City. However, the emphasis on sports had continued. By 1924 the park contained three cricket ovals, with a shelter and dressing sheds, three croquet lawns, and two tennis courts. The Graceville Croquet Club was formed in March 1919, with Thomas Murray Hall, Member of the Queensland Legislative Council, as its first Patron. A number of returned servicemen were settling in area at this time, and their wives wanted their own sporting activities. The Sherwood Shire Council leased a portion of the park to the croquet club in May 1919. The southernmost of the three croquet lawns remained as rough grass until 1923, and the croquet clubhouse was probably built between 1924 and 1929. The clubhouse has received a small extension to the north since 1985. The Brisbane City Council continues to lease the premises to the club. The nearby Memorial Park Estate used the name of the park for the estate and was available for sale on 24 April 1926.

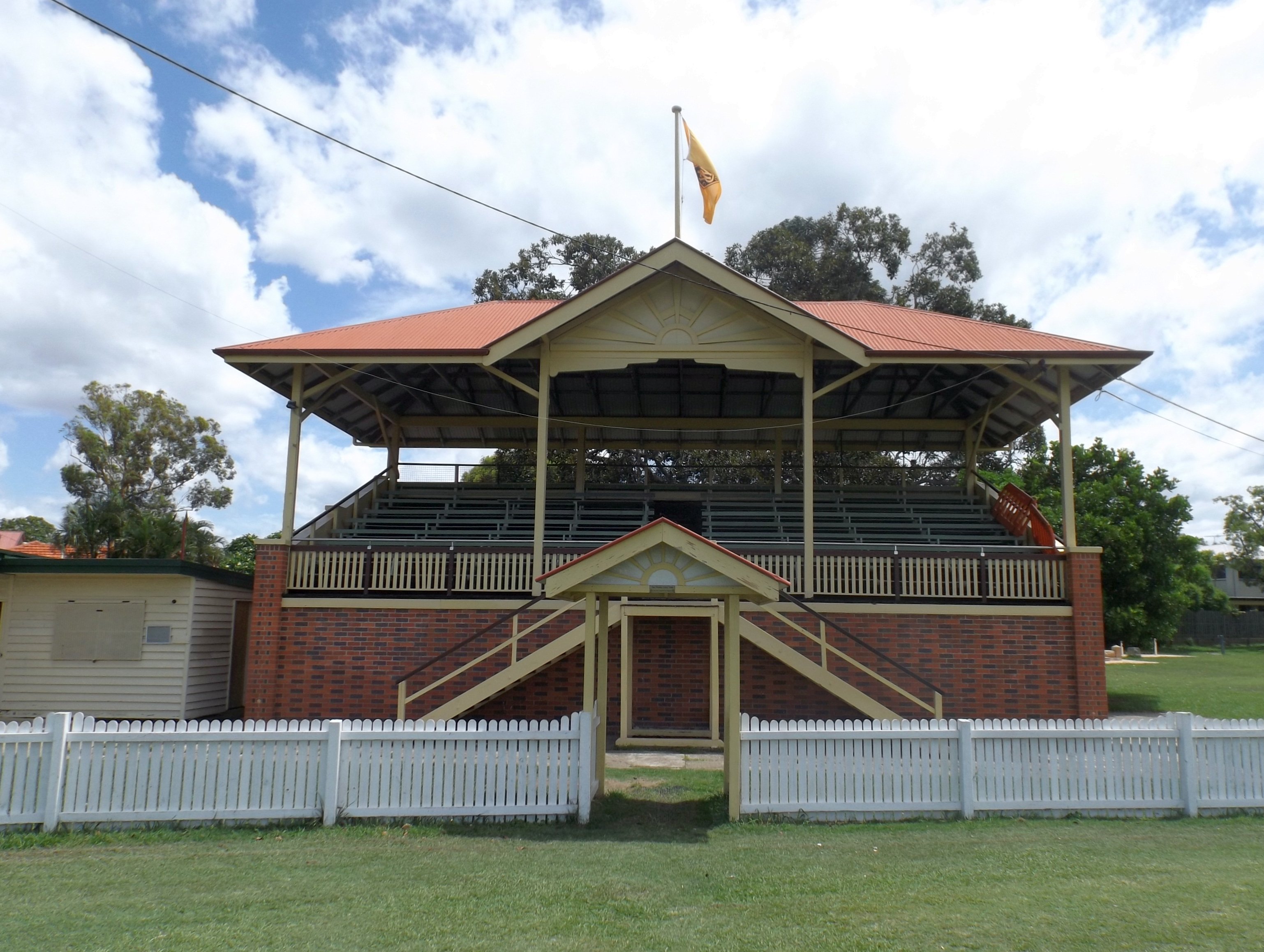
Grandstand, 2014

The Western Suburbs District Cricket Club was formed in 1921, and it has had an association with the park since 1924. In 1928 the Queensland Cricket association took out a twenty-year lease on playing ovals one and two, and a seasonal lease on oval three. The grandstand facing the number one oval was opened in September 1936. The Brisbane City Council Register of new buildings lists the grandstand on 13 February 1936, with H. Sanham as the contractor, and the Brisbane City Council as the architect. The cost of the brick and timber building was listed at £1000. The two changing rooms and storage area within the brick ground floor have been renovated and reconfigured over time, and the current latticed balustrade at the front of the seating was introduced since 1985. Two similar grandstands currently exist in Brisbane, one at Bulimba Memorial Park (built 1923), and one at Langlands Park (1937).

Overlapping ovals replaced the three undersize ovals. The number one oval was reconstructed with ash, its sightscreens were moved, and the arris fence was removed. Soon after 1968 some practice-bowling cages were installed on the south side of the park between the croquet club and the war memorial. Currently, the two main ovals have turf wickets, and a concrete wicket stands where the number three oval used to be located. The cricket clubhouse to the east of the grandstand started as a refreshment stall c. 1946, and was extended in the 1960s. Both the number two and number three ovals had their own dressing sheds, which have changed or have been removed. The current timber changing-shed facing the number two oval replaced an earlier structure between 1946 and 1952. It has been extended to the south since 1985, and a new aluminium shed has been erected nearby.

Although there were two tennis courts in the park's southeast corner by 1924, the Banksia Tennis Club did not take out a formal lease until 1938, for 1 rood 4.4 perches (1,120 m^{2}) of land. The club also built a timber clubhouse before 1946. The Banksia Tennis Club surrendered its lease in 1989, due to the aging of its membership, and a car park and a half basketball court had replaced the tennis courts, their fences, and clubhouse, by 1993.

Other clubs have also used the park over time. The Brisbane Hockey Association has had the winter use of the ovals since 1941, and in 1955 the Graceville United Soccer Club had the winter use of the number four oval, an area in the north of the park between ovals one and three. This area had a concrete wicket by 1952, but this had been removed by 1975. In the 1960s there are also references in Brisbane City Council records to the Sherwood District Junior Australian Rules Club, and the South Rugby League Juniors. There were floodlights on poles around the perimeter of the park by 1961, but in 1975 the South West United Hockey Club requested new lighting, for night training.

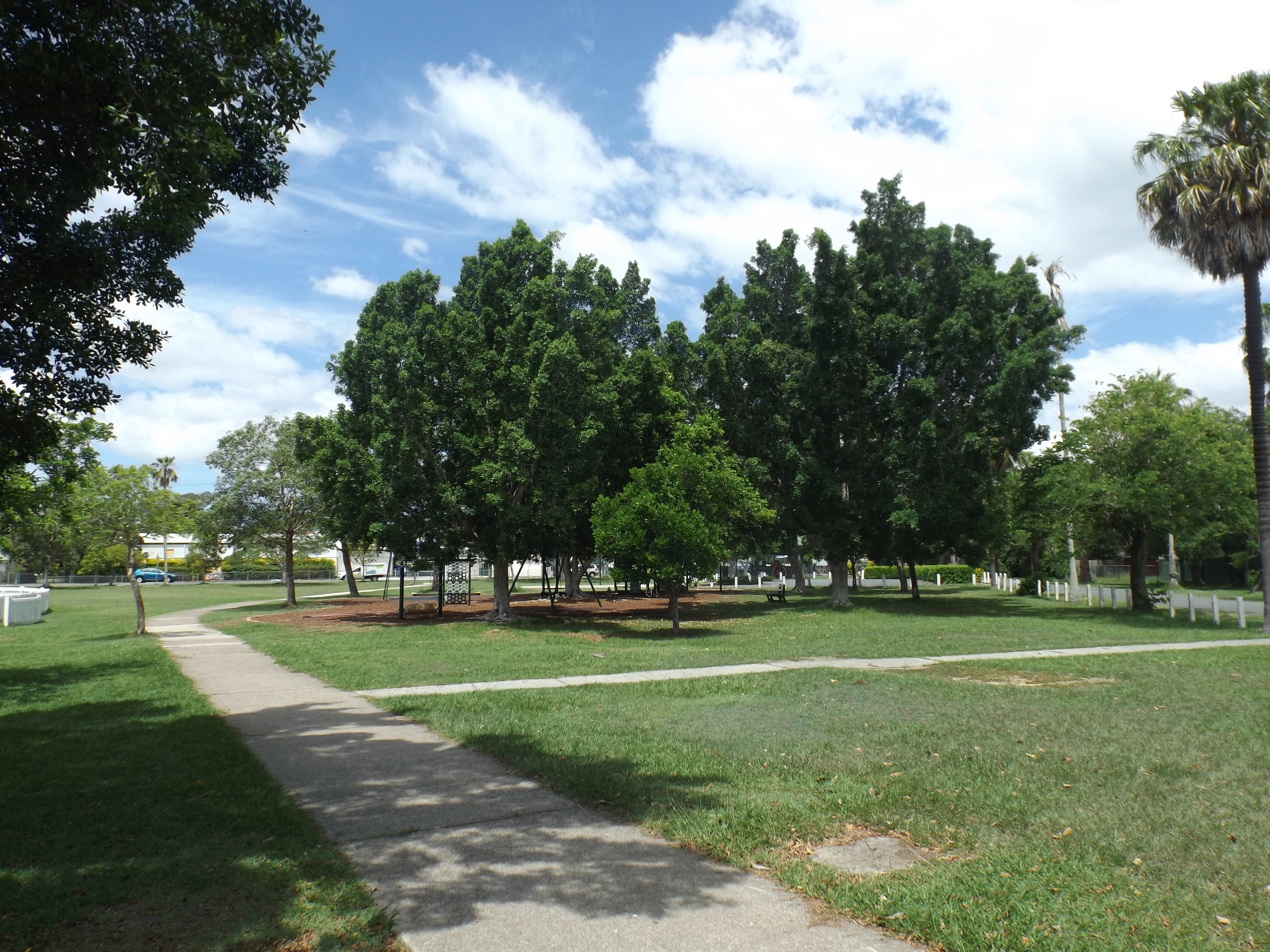
Playground, 2014

Other built features in the park include the toilet block near the croquet club, which was built in the late 1960s, and the playground, which existed between the cricket clubhouse and the tennis club by 1961. The playground's equipment was upgraded in 1968, the late 1980s, and in the 1990s. A shade canopy was added in 1993. A bikeway path, along the western and northern perimeter of park, was built about 1991. In 1996, the steamroller, which had been in the playground since the 1960s, was moved, restored, and installed inside a roofed enclosure to the east of the car park. The steamroller is an "S" type, four steam-horse power model, built between 1923 and 1925, by Marshall and Sons and Company, in Gainsborough, England. The ex Brisbane City Council steamroller is listed as an "Engineering and Industrial Heritage Site" on the website of Engineers Australia, Queensland Division.

Features that have now been removed include two earth closets, sited either side and to the south of the memorial, which were probably removed around the time that the new toilet block was installed. A zigzag concrete path, installed in the 1960s, once ran through the site of the playground, and some of the tree plantings along Oxley Road, including fig trees and palms, have been replaced. Buildings that have been removed since 1985 include the timber changing shed for the number three oval, and a small shed just north of the croquet club which was replaced by an aluminium shed.

== Description ==
Graceville Memorial Park, bounded by Oxley Rd to the east, Plumridge Street to the north, and Appel Street to the west, lies just to the east of the Ipswich to Brisbane railway line, and currently covers 6.6 hectares (16 acres). There is vehicle access from Oxley Road, along the memorial drive, and pedestrians can access the park from anywhere along Appel Street, Plumridge Street, and Oxley Road, as well as from the end of Addison Street in the south, and via the access way from Churchill Street. The park is flat, and the main features consist of the tree plantings and buildings. The number one cricket oval is near Oxley Road, the number two oval is in the middle of the park, and a concrete wicket is located in the northwest corner of the park.

Mature memorial bunya trees and cotton trees are planted on the northern and western perimeter of the park. An avenue of mature bauhinia, cabbage tree palms, and Chinese elms runs from Oxley road to the war memorial, and a single row of mature figs and camphor laurels runs west from the memorial to Appel Street. Behind the grandstand are two mature Moreton Bay fig trees, and two mature bunya pines. The Oxley Road frontage still has some mature fig trees and palm trees, along with more recent plantings.

A steamroller stands under a shelter between Oxley Road and the car park. Further west is the cricket clubhouse, a single-story timber building, with a low-pitched skillion roof clad in galvanised iron. A sightboard stands just to the north of the clubhouse, and across the number one oval, a second sightboard stands among the memorial trees on Plumridge Street.

=== The Cricket Grandstand ===
The cricket grandstand that faces the number one oval is a rectangular pavilion, with a timber-trussed hipped roof clad in corrugated iron that is supported on plain timber posts. The tiered seating area is supported on an orange brick base, which contains two changing rooms, toilets, and a storage area. The hardwood floorboards of the seating area are covered in bitumen sheeting, and there is a scorer's desk in an upper row of the timber seating. The gable on the northern face has a flagpole and a rising sun motive infill. A divided timber staircase rises to the viewing area on the north face. Below the concrete capping to the walls on the east, west, and south elevations there are decorative panels of roughcast render between the projecting rows of bricks.

=== War Memorial ===
The war memorial is at the western end of the memorial avenue of trees, at the south side of the park, and consists of a polished grey granite column set on a light grey granite pedestal, which sits on a stepped base of rusticated grey granite. Sandstone tiles and a low fence of sandstone with eight sandstone bollards surround the 5.5-metre (18 ft) high monument. The shaft of the column has a gold laurel wreath imprinted on its north face, and is crowned with a polished ball, which is etched with a map of Australia, and the words "ANZAC". The north face of the pedestal has a small plaque reading The Great War 1914–1919, above a copper scroll that lists the Shire's dead in the First World War and which is inscribed Fallen Heroes of the Sherwood Shire, Honoured and in Memory Evergreen. Under the scroll is a small plaque reading Dulce et Decorum est pro Patria Mori. At the base of the pedestal is the badge of the Royal Australian Navy. On the east face is a plaque reading World War II 1939–45, and under it, is a plaque inscribed In honour of the men and women who served Australia in time of conflict during World War II. Lest We Forget. At the base of the pedestal is the rising sun badge of the Australian army. On the west face a plaque reads Korea-Malaya Borneo-Vietnam. Under this is set the badge of the Royal Australian Air Force. Three flagpoles stand to the west of the monument.

=== Croquet Clubhouse ===
The croquet clubhouse and its three playing lawns stand on the Appel Street frontage of the park. Small shade structures with seating are on the borders of the croquet lawns. The clubhouse is a rectangular timber building with its long axis addressing the middle lawn. It has a gabled roof that is clad in corrugated iron. A modern shade structure extends over the southern entrance, and there is an extension at the northern end of the building. A gable projects towards the lawn above an entrance on the northern side there are sash windows. Internally, the clubhouse has a timber floor, with walls and ceiling clad in fibrous cement sheeting. Most of this internal space is used for small tables and chairs and there is a small kitchenette and toilet at one end. Two timber honour boards are displayed.

Number two oval's changing shed, which has its back to the croquet lawns, is a timber building on a concrete slab with a skillion roof clad in galvanised iron. It has an extension on its southern end that accommodates a small garage.

The features of the Graceville Memorial Park which are not of historical significance include the aluminium storage shed near the croquet clubhouse and the aluminium shed to the south of the number two oval's changing shed; the brick toilet block; the cricket practice nets; a drinking fountain near the playground; the playground and its equipment; the bikeway; the half basketball court and car park; the steamroller's shelter shed; and assorted park seating.

== Heritage listing ==
Graceville Memorial Park was listed on the Queensland Heritage Register on 5 September 2006 having satisfied the following criteria.

The place is important in demonstrating the evolution or pattern of Queensland's history.

Surviving as a highly visible remnant of the development of the Graceville district, the use of the park for team sports from the 1890s to the present demonstrates the interest in health-promoting recreation that occurred in Queensland from the late 1880s onwards. Reflecting the proliferation of recreational sport clubs that occurred during post-war suburban development, a croquet club was established in the park in 1919, and cricket and tennis facilities were operational by 1924. The Brisbane City Council's expenditure on a cricket grandstand during the Depression demonstrates the continued importance of sport to Queenslanders during the 1930s. The decade after the First World War witnessed demonstrations of grief for those who had died. Graceville Memorial Park's War Memorial, with its linked memorial avenue, and rows of memorial bunya and cottonwood trees along Appel and Plumridge Streets, demonstrates the process of grieving that was occurring across Australia in 1920 and is symbolic of both civic mourning and national pride.

The place demonstrates rare, uncommon or endangered aspects of Queensland's cultural heritage.

Graceville Memorial Park has features that are now uncommon within a suburban park, such as the handsome and substantial Interwar grandstand and the extensive formal plantings of memorial bunya trees.

The place is important in demonstrating the principal characteristics of a particular class of cultural places.

Graceville Memorial Park is important in demonstrating the principal characteristics of its class, having open recreational space, sports facilities, clubhouses and a grandstand within a park whose focal point is a War Memorial and which is bordered by memorial plantings.

The place is important because of its aesthetic significance.

As a large open space with fine mature trees, the park has landmark value. The memorial avenue of trees delineates the ceremonial approach to the War Memorial and effectively marks the park's southern border. The cottonwood and bunya arrangement is also striking in its contrast of alternating size and shape. The park is a fine example of the work of the Brisbane City Architect's Office in the 1930s.

The place has a strong or special association with a particular community or cultural group for social, cultural or spiritual reasons.

The war memorial in the park has a strong and continuing association with the wider community as evidence of the impact of a major historic event and as the focal point for the remembrance of that event. The park is also important to the local area as a venue for sport and recreation for several generations, having a long-standing association with the Graceville Croquet Club and Western Suburbs District Cricket Club.
