= The Fort, Oxley =

The Fort
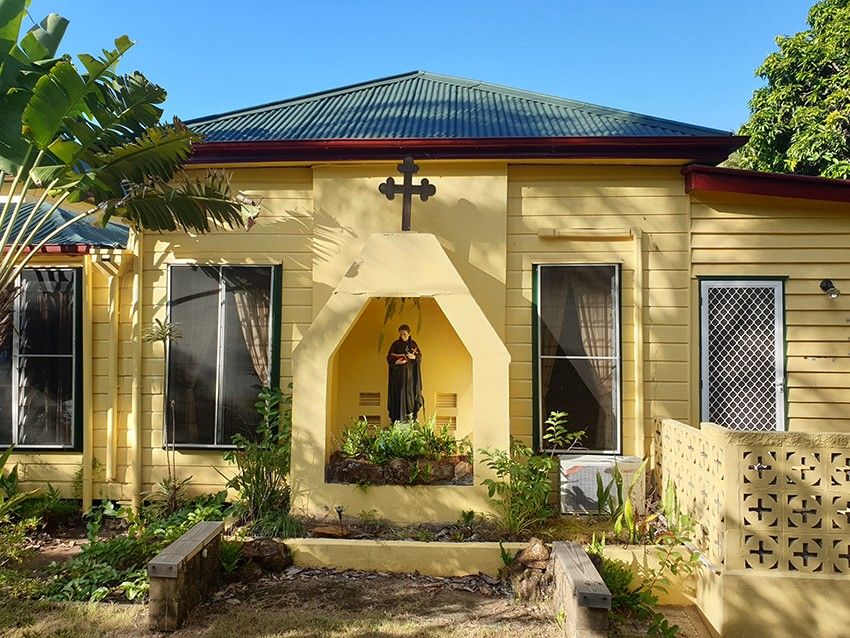
- Kitchen fireplace and chimney converted to grotto, The Fort, Oxley, 2020

- Location within Queensland
- 27.5456°S 152.9661°E
- Location: 199 Fort Road, Oxley, Queensland, Australia

History
- Design period: 1870s–1890s Late 19th century
- Built: 1882

Site notes
- Architect: Francis Drummond Greville Stanley

Queensland Heritage Register
- Official name: The Fort; Regina Coeli Retreat; St Mary's Retreat
- Type: state heritage
- Designated: 25 September 2020
- Reference no.: 650252
- Type: Religion/worship: Monastery; Religion/worship: Retreat; Residential: Detached house
- Theme: Building settlements, towns, cities and dwellings: Dwellings; Creating social and cultural institutions: Worshipping and religious institutions

The Fort is a heritage-listed monastery, spiritual retreat and house at 199 Fort Road, Oxley, City of Brisbane, Queensland, Australia. It was designed by Francis Drummond Greville Stanley and built in 1882. It is also known as Regina Coeli Retreat and St Mary's Retreat. It was added to the Queensland Heritage Register on 25 September 2020.

== History ==
The Fort, located at the north end of Fort Road in Oxley is a c. 1882 timber house situated on a high bluff on the south bank of the Brisbane River. It was constructed for the retired pastoralist Henry William Coxen (1823–1915), one of the early European settlers on the Darling Downs, on a 9 hectares (22 acres) property he had purchased in 1865. The Fort was sold to the Corkran family in 1906, then to the Passionist Order of the Catholic Church (the Congregation of the Passion, or the Passionists) in 1955, at which time the property became the order's only Queensland retreat (monastery) and a base for their local community outreach. It is officially known as St Mary's Retreat. The majority of The Fort property, not including the house, was sold to the Brisbane City Council (BBC) in 2005, and is now The Fort Bushland Reserve.

Oxley, traditionally the land of the Turrbal and Jagera people, is about 11 kilometres (6.8 mi) south-west of the Brisbane central business district. In the 1850s, the area was known as Boyland's Pocket, after the pastoralist Thomas Boyland, and in the early 1860s it was subdivided into small farms. Churches, a post office and a hotel were built in the 1860s, near Ipswich Road between Brisbane and Ipswich, and Oxley Primary School opened nearby in 1870. The Main Line railway towards Brisbane, over a bridge at Indooroopilly, opened as far as Oxley West (Sherwood) on 1 October 1874. Although the completion of the Main Line railway between Brisbane and Ipswich in 1876 boosted settlement in the district, Oxley remained largely rural until after World War II, with two small areas of settlement: one near Ipswich Road, and the other to the north near the Oxley railway station.

In January 1865, the site of "The Fort" (Portion 189 in the Parish of Oxley) consisting of 22 acres 1 rood (9.0 ha), was purchased by Henry William Coxen and William Sim of "Bendemere" for £59 15s. Located on the south bank of the Brisbane River, less than 1 kilometre (0.62 mi) northwest of the later location of the Oxley railway station, the land was transferred to Coxen alone in 1866. It has previously been claimed that the site of The Fort was purchased by Coxen in 1873, after he passed the property while travelling by boat to Ipswich and its position reminded him of a Fort in Bombay (now Mumbai), India.

Henry William Coxen (1823–1915) was born in Croydon, England, on 3 March 1823, the son of Lieutenant Henry Holman Coxen, of the 14th Light Infantry. A firearms accident in 1836, during his time at Eton College, badly injured Henry's right hand. In 1838, aged 15, Henry travelled to Tasmania with his uncle and aunt, noted ornithologist John Gould and his wife Elizabeth (née Coxen), where they were guests of Governor John Franklin. They soon moved to New South Wales. After learning about sheep and cattle management on various stations owned by his paternal uncle, Stephen Coxen, and under the tutelage of his uncle Charles Coxen, Henry was sent north in 1842 to the Darling Downs, where Patrick Leslie and his brothers had begun European settlement in March 1840. Accompanied by Lieutenant Irving, three men and an Aboriginal boy, Henry took two drays and 300 head of cattle and selected Jondaryan station in the northern Darling Downs on behalf of his uncle Charles. Jondaryan station was first selected by Henry Dennis in 1841, while he was in the area to select Jimbour for Richard Todd Scougall, and Myall Creek for Charles Coxen.

Henry returned to England in 1845 to work for a mercantile firm. He married Mary Ann Shelton in London in January 1848, and after some time in the Cape Colony (now within South Africa) the couple returned to Sydney in April 1852. He then took up further pastoral stations in what became Queensland, becoming the owner or part-owner of at least 17 large grazing leases, including Bendemere near Yuleba. Bendemere was advertised for sale in 1864, and was later sold to the Macfarlane family. He divorced in 1865, and married Margaret Moorhead in Victoria in February 1866. Henry disposed of his pastoral interests, and he and Margaret had returned to England by 1867. After unsuccessful investments in foreign securities and the South African sugar industry, Coxen and his family returned to Queensland in 1880. By this time, Henry and Margaret had four children. Henry and Margaret's eldest child was Sarah Moorhead Coxen (b.1861). Their eldest son, Henry Charles Coxen (b.1869) became the chief of staff of the Queensland Department of Public Works. Their younger son, Major-General Walter Adams Coxen CB, CMG, DSO (b.1870) fought in World War I, rising to command the Royal Artillery of the Australian Corps, and by 1930 was Chief of the Australian Section of the Imperial General Staff. The youngest daughter was Ella Margaret Coxen (b.c. 1879-80).

In late 1881, Coxen was still living at Russell Street, Toowoomba. At this time he requested that the owners of Portion 188 in Oxley (located to the east of Portion 189, between it and today's Blackheath Road) pay for half of the dividing fence. His Toowoomba address was also listed on the Quarterly Electoral list, Electoral District of Oxley, in July 1881.

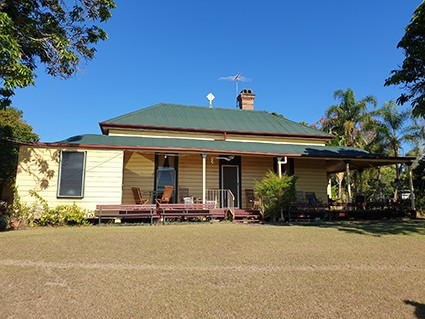
View of the house from the north, 2020

Coxen built his house "The Fort" c. 1882, on the 9 acres (3.6 ha) of land he had purchased in Oxley in 1865. In May 1882, architect Andrea Stombuco sued Coxen for full payment for his preparation of plans and specifications, and taking site levels, for a building for Coxen at Oxley. Stombuco claimed he had been contacted by Coxen in September 1880 to give an estimate for a four-roomed house. Stombuco then drew up his plans, based on sketches received from Coxen, and called for tenders, with the lowest received being £1001. Unhappy with a measurement error on a drawing of a large shed (probably the stables) at the property, which had led to an overestimate of the quantity of timber needed, Coxen employed architect Francis Drummond Greville Stanley to revise Stombuco's plans for the house, and had received a new estimate for the house of £810 from a contractor in Toowoomba. At the time of the court case "the building was now being erected in accordance with the new drawings and specification". Coxen won the court case.

FDG Stanley (1839–97) was an architect in Queensland 1862 from 1897. Rising to Colonial Architect in 1873, Stanley was responsible for ambitious, substantial public buildings in Brisbane and regional centres of the colony, including schools, banks, churches, hotels, shops, and civic buildings such as Brisbane General Post Office (1871–2) and its Telegraph Office extension (1876–9). His work is distinguished within early Queensland architects, and his high profile and prolific output has been considered formative in Queensland architecture.

In 1882, Stanley was in private practice and, at the height of his career, designing the Queensland National Bank's headquarters (1880–5) in Brisbane, and opening a branch office of his practice in Maryborough. During this period, Stanley also designed substantial residences, including Sidney House, (1882), a villa for Robert Hart (1883), Whinstaines (1886); and Tighnabruaich in Indooroopilly (1889–90). The Fort was considerably more modest. Little of Stanley's modest residential designs is recorded or studied and it is not clear how much, if any, of Stombuco's existing design was used by Stanley However, The Fort does not have any obvious Stanley hallmarks.

In 1932, Florence Eliza Lord described The Fort for The Queenslander newspaper:

"Its outer walls are formed of wide horizontal boards, and the inner of vertical ones. The house was originally built without a hall of any kind, the four main rooms - the drawing-room, dining-room, and two bedrooms-opening into each other. There are two verandah bedrooms, and a verandah running between two wings projecting from each end of the back of the house. The wing on the right as one steps on to this back verandah from the dining-room comprises the kitchen... and the other contains a storeroom, bathroom, and-in the Coxen's time-a spare room and Mr Coxen's office. The three latter all open onto a verandah connecting with that previously mentioned. The store-room opened on the other side of this wing, and below it was a cool cellar..."

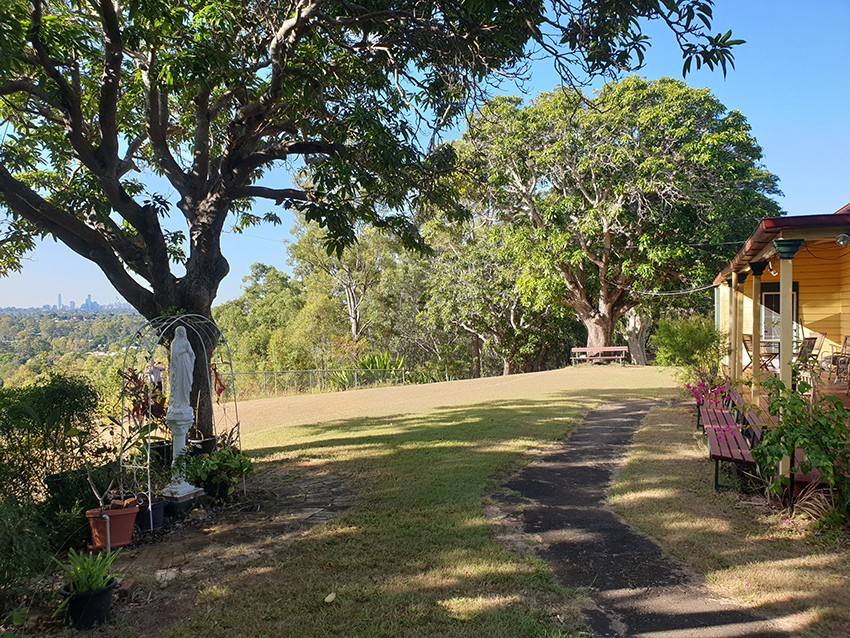
Setting with mature trees and view, 2020

The house was located near the highest point on the property, with a sweeping view over the Brisbane River. The remainder of the property, which sloped down to the south, was a mixture of treed and open space by 1936. For affluent Queenslanders, residing on spacious properties on hilltops, or near the river, and away from the crowded city, was a common practice. Some other examples are the 19th century residences "Tighnabruaich" at Indooroopilly (1889–90), "Middenbury" at Toowong (1865), "Bertholme" at New Farm (c. 1885), and "Amity" at New Farm (1892). The Fort's site achieved all of the above.

During 1883 and 1884, Coxen purchased more land to the east of Portion 189, on which he built two more houses: "Eddystone" and "The Slopes" (neither extant). Eddystone and The Slopes were described by F. E .Lord in 1932 as being similar in construction to The Fort, although without rear wings. Eddystone was located amongst trees on the ridge to the east of The Fort, while The Slopes was located on a cleared terrace, down a slope to the east of Eddystone.

While living at The Fort, Coxen was active in both the Freemasons and in local politics. He was a Justice of the Peace, a member of the Yeerongpilly Divisional Board (and as chairman in 1889), and later a member of the Sherwood Divisional Board (which split from Yeerongpilly in 1891), and served as its chairman in 1902. Margaret Coxen died during a visit to Sandgate that year. After he sold The Fort in 1906, Henry lived at Slopes, where he died in 1915.

The Fort house and 9.4 hectares (23 acres) of property was offered for sale by auction in February 1906, at which time it had 15 rooms, along with a garden of 2 acres (0.8ha), stables, stockyard, laundry, and outbuildings, and "one of the most beautiful views around Brisbane". In May 1906, the Fort and 12.6 hectares (31 acres) of the property was transferred to Thomas Knight Corkran (1852–1937), an Irish-born Catholic, educated at the Marist College in France, who had joined the Queensland police in Western Queensland in the 1870s.

Thomas Corkran ran a dairy herd on the land, which included a dam and a well (dug by Coxen) in the small valley to the south of the house. According to Thomas's daughter Olivia, during the Corkran period of ownership The Fort included a hall, lounge, dining room, six bedrooms, bathroom, storeroom and kitchen; there were cedar doors and some double walls in the house, and "two huge rooms for the men". The ceilings of The Fort were also unlined when the Corkrans purchased the property, according to Olivia. The Corkrans used its cellar as a dairy, housing a cream separator; and Thomas Corkran built a separate laundry at the rear of the house. The Corkran family used Eddystone Road (previously known as Coxen's Lane) to access The Fort from the east, and they also had an entrance from Fort Road, west of the house, in addition to the original entrance, further south near the stables. In December 1912, subdivision 1 of Portion 189, 2 roods (0.20 ha) at the corner of Fort Road and Cliveden Avenue, was transferred to Gertrude Letitia Corkran. A house was built on this site, but had been removed by 1936. By this time, there were mature trees along the Fort Road approach to The Fort residence, including north of the southwest corner of Portion 189, inside the entrance by the stables, and to the immediate north and south residence, and some of these trees survive today.

Thomas Corkran died at the Fort in January 1937. He was survived by his wife, three sons and six daughters. Subdivision 2 of Portion 189 (21 acres, 3 roods (8.8ha) was transferred to members of the Corkran family, before being sold to the Provincial of the Congregation of the Passion in Australasia, for £6000, in June 1955. Subdivision 1 of Portion 189 (0.2ha), and subdivisions 1 to 4 of Portion 188 (3.4ha), were later transferred to the Passionists in April 1962.

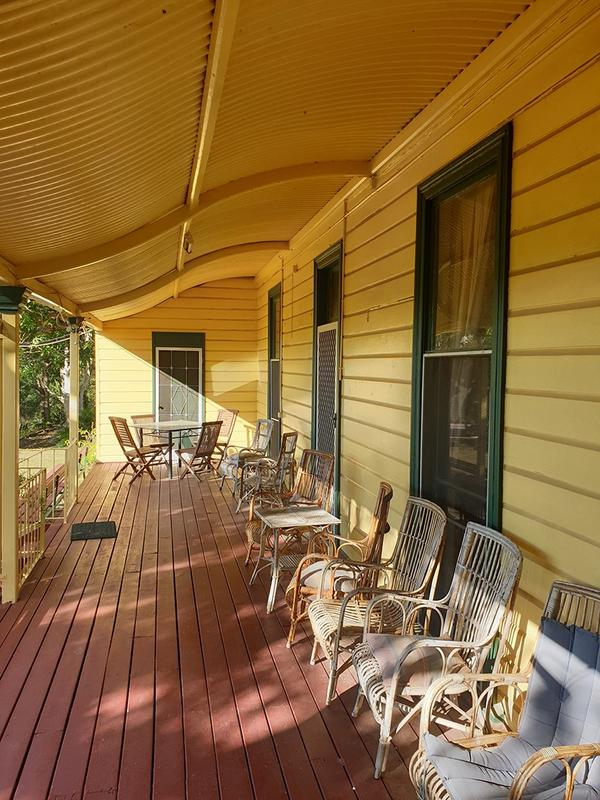
North verandah, 2020

The Passionist Order was founded in Italy in 1720 by St Paul of the Cross (Paolo Danei Massari, 1694–1775). The Passionists, Catholic missionary priests who "live in community" (in a retreat, or monastery), promote the memory of the passion of Jesus. They combine a monastic life of prayer and contemplation with missions and outreach to the communities in which they are located. The Passionists conducted a mission to Stradbroke Island, the traditional land of the Quandamooka people, from 1843 to 1847, the first Catholic outreach to the Aboriginal people of Queensland. The order later returned to Australia at Marrickville, New South Wales in 1887. In 2020 the Passionists have a presence in 59 countries, and one Passionist province covers Australia, Papua New Guinea, New Zealand and Vietnam. In Australia, the Passionists are located at St Brigid's in Marrickville, Sydney; Holy Cross, Templestowe, Melbourne; Endeavour Hills, Melbourne; Glen Osmond, Adelaide; St Joseph's Church, Hobart; and St Mary's Retreat (The Fort) at Oxley.

The purchase of The Fort by the Passionists was part of a mid-1950s expansion of the order, which included sending missionaries to Papua New Guinea in 1955, and Passionists to St Kilda in Melbourne and Hobart in Tasmania in 1956. The Passionist Provincial, Xavier Bates, along with Father Placid and Archbishop James Duhig of Brisbane, scouted Brisbane looking for a site for a Passionist retreat in late 1954, selecting The Fort. Archbishop Duhig formally approved the Passionists' application to open a house (monastery) for a Passionist community at Oxley in December 1954, and Fathers Placid and John moved into The Fort on 1 April 1955. They were soon joined by Fathers Anselm, Gregory, Hilary, Ignatius and Brother Anthony, and all worked on tidying up the house and grounds. A front room of The Fort was turned into a temporary chapel, and old sheds and stockyards were pulled down, except for the stable building (which was dismantled in 1956, and moved to its present location east of the house) and a small shed. The lookout in front of the house, overlooking the river, was formed in April 1955, and a new wing was added to the rear of the house, running east, with four bedrooms, and a washroom and toilet block. The Corkrans' gable-roofed laundry was moved and attached to the southern end of the west rear wing (in 2020 there is a skillion-roofed kitchen in this position).

On 6 November 1955, the first Mass was celebrated on a new high altar in the chapel, and Archbishop Duhig formally visited The Fort (initially known as the Regina Coeli Retreat, and later St Mary's Retreat, but commonly known as The Fort) on 2 August 1956, and blessed it. The first public Sunday Mass was held in the chapel on 3 February 1957. Ministries performed by the Passionist community at Oxley have since included youth retreats, family group, chaplaincy at the Canossa Hospital (from 1960), school chaplaincy, assisting at local parishes and at the Cathedral of St Stephen, supplies, missions, and retreats. Celebrations are often held in the grounds, including Music under the Stars, Christmas Eve Mass and other feast day celebrations, and mission stalls (markets for charity) are also held on the grounds. Passionist priests stay at The Fort on their way to other locations.

Other changes to The Fort house and grounds during the years of Passionist occupancy have included: a new driveway, from near the former site of the stables, to a circular drive on the west side of the house (in the late 1980s this driveway was concreted, and a new entrance was formed, midway between the two pre-1936 entrances from Fort Road); two cannons being located at The Fort between c. 1963-71 (one mounted on a concrete slab west of the house; the other mounted on concrete blocks east of the lookout), before they were traded for a figure of Christ on the Cross; and the conversion of the sacristy (southern part of east verandah) into two visitor's rooms in 1977, by removing the wall between the core and the verandah. In 1982, a pergola was built between the two original rear wings of the house, with a deck added in the late 1980s. Also in the late 1980s, the 1950s accommodation wing at the rear was extended further to the east. In the early 1990s, due to the growth in numbers of members of the public attending, Sunday Mass was moved into the former stables, known as "The Shed", which has since been damaged by two fires, including one in December 2005.

In 2005, 10.6 hectares (26 acres) of The Fort's grounds were purchased by the Brisbane City Council, after the local community objected to plans for housing on the land, and it is now The Fort Bushland Reserve. This includes regrowth on the areas cleared for dairy farming and was initially infested with invasive weeds.

As of 2026, the 1880s house built by Coxen and 1.8 hectares (4.4 acres) of land remains a Passionist Retreat. The community of priests at The Fort has served the community in Oxley and beyond for 70 years since 1956.

== Description ==
The Fort comprises a detached riverside house and its setting in Oxley, approximately 10.5 kilometres (6.5 mi) southwest of Brisbane CBD. Accessed from Fort Road on its southwest side, the house stands on a large allotment near the edge of a steep bank of the Brisbane River and has spectacular panoramic views spanning north-west to north-east. The setting of the house includes part of the surrounding house yard and part of the adjacent public park, which was originally part of The Fort's large property.

=== The House ===
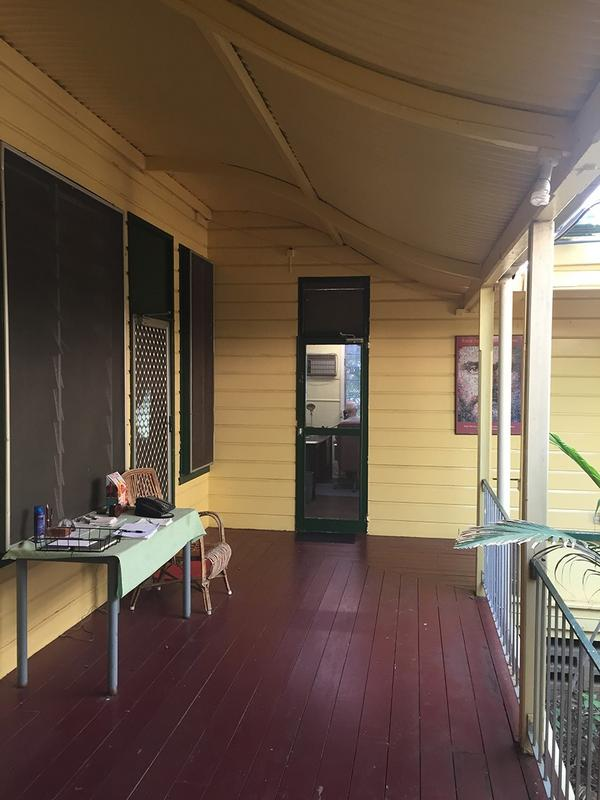
Rear verandah, 2020

The house is a single-storey lowset timber-framed and timber-clad structure. It faces north toward the view of the river and has a square core with a hipped roof surrounded by a verandah with an ogee roof. Projecting from each end of the south verandah are matching pyramid-roofed service wings and a face brick chimney projects from the core's roof. A cross is mounted on the centre ridge of the main roof and the kitchen wing's chimney (western side of the house) has been converted to form a grotto.

The front (north) verandah is open to the view and the northern verandah wall is symmetrical, retaining original step-through double-hung windows either side of an entrance door. Parts of the east, west, and south verandahs have been enclosed (in stages, likely pre-1906) to form a number of smaller interconnected rooms and some have had the verandah wall demolished and the enclosed verandah incorporated into the core.

Internally, the core comprises a large front entrance room, which is used a chapel (formerly two rooms - drawing room and bedroom) with an altar at the east end in the enclosed verandah and a small choir alcove in the enclosed north east corner verandah. The core's two rear rooms are a former dining room with fireplace, and a former bedroom, which has been partitioned to form two passageways and two bedrooms, incorporating the enclosed eastern verandah. The core's ceilings are notably high. The western service wing comprises a former kitchen (now dining room) and the eastern service wing accommodates two rooms and a short open verandah (the two rooms are possibly a former storeroom, now passageway, and a bathroom, now office). The former cellar under this wing has been replaced by a concreted open space.

=== Grounds, views, and mature trees ===
The house is approached from the southwest from Fort Street via a long drive arriving at its western side. It stands roughly in the centre of its large house yard, which comprises terraced lawns dotted with mature ornamental trees. To its north, the land slopes steeply down to the Brisbane River waterline and is lightly forested, permitting distant northerly views from the house and northern grounds.

Other mature ornamental trees stand in the adjacent public park that indicate the extent of The Fort's former property size. These trees line the Fort Street boundary and stand near a former, pre-1936 entrance.

== Heritage listing ==
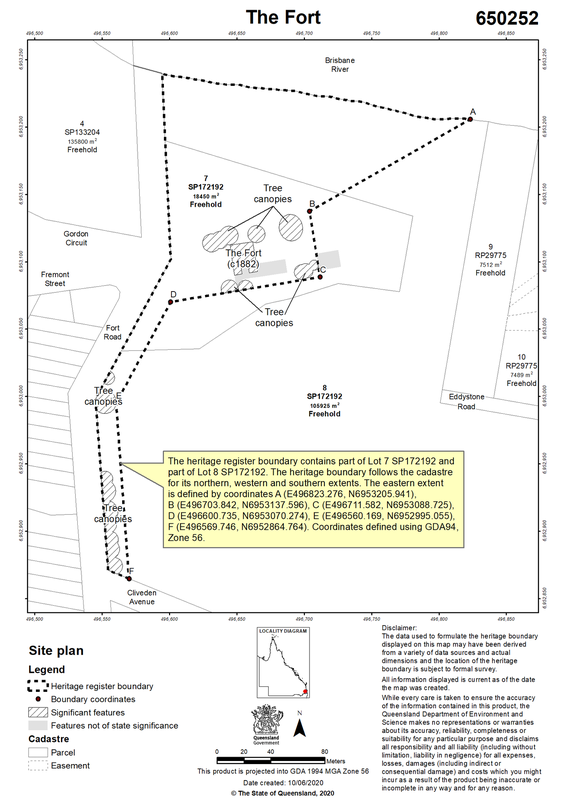
Site plan with significant elements, 2020

The Fort was listed on the Queensland Heritage Register on 25 September 2020 having satisfied the following criteria, and being given the following comments.

The place is important in demonstrating the evolution or pattern of Queensland's history.

"The Fort (c. 1882), a house constructed for the retired pastoralist Henry William Coxen, an early settler of the Darling Downs, is important in demonstrating the pattern of residential development in Queensland, and in particular the establishment of substantial estates by affluent Queenslanders, on high grounds, or near the river, on the suburban periphery of Brisbane in the 19th century. Early mature trees along the Fort Road approach to the place illustrate the extent of the original estate."

The place is important because of its aesthetic significance.

"Sited on a high bluff above the Brisbane River, The Fort is important for its aesthetic significance, brought about through the relationship between the house and its setting, with sweeping views of the river, Fig Tree Pocket peninsula, and the distant forested hills, Mount Coot-tha, and CBD high-rises. Viewing this panorama from the northern verandah and grounds, combined with The Fort's secluded setting amidst mature trees and lawns, evokes a sense of contemplative retreat."

The place has a strong or special association with a particular community or cultural group for social, cultural or spiritual reasons.

"The Fort has a special association with the Passionist Order for spiritual reasons as their only community of priests in Queensland. The house was adapted for their use as a retreat (monastery) in 1955 and has since served as the order's base for its Ministries, and the site of their public Sunday masses."

The place has a special association with the life or work of a particular person, group or organisation of importance in Queensland's history.

"The Fort has a special association with the early Darling Downs settler and prominent Queensland pastoralist Henry William Coxen (1823–1915), who established the house c. 1882 after his retirement from pastoralism, and resided there until 1906. While living at The Fort, Coxen remained active in the community, serving on local divisional boards and as a Justice of the Peace."
