= Beth-Eden =

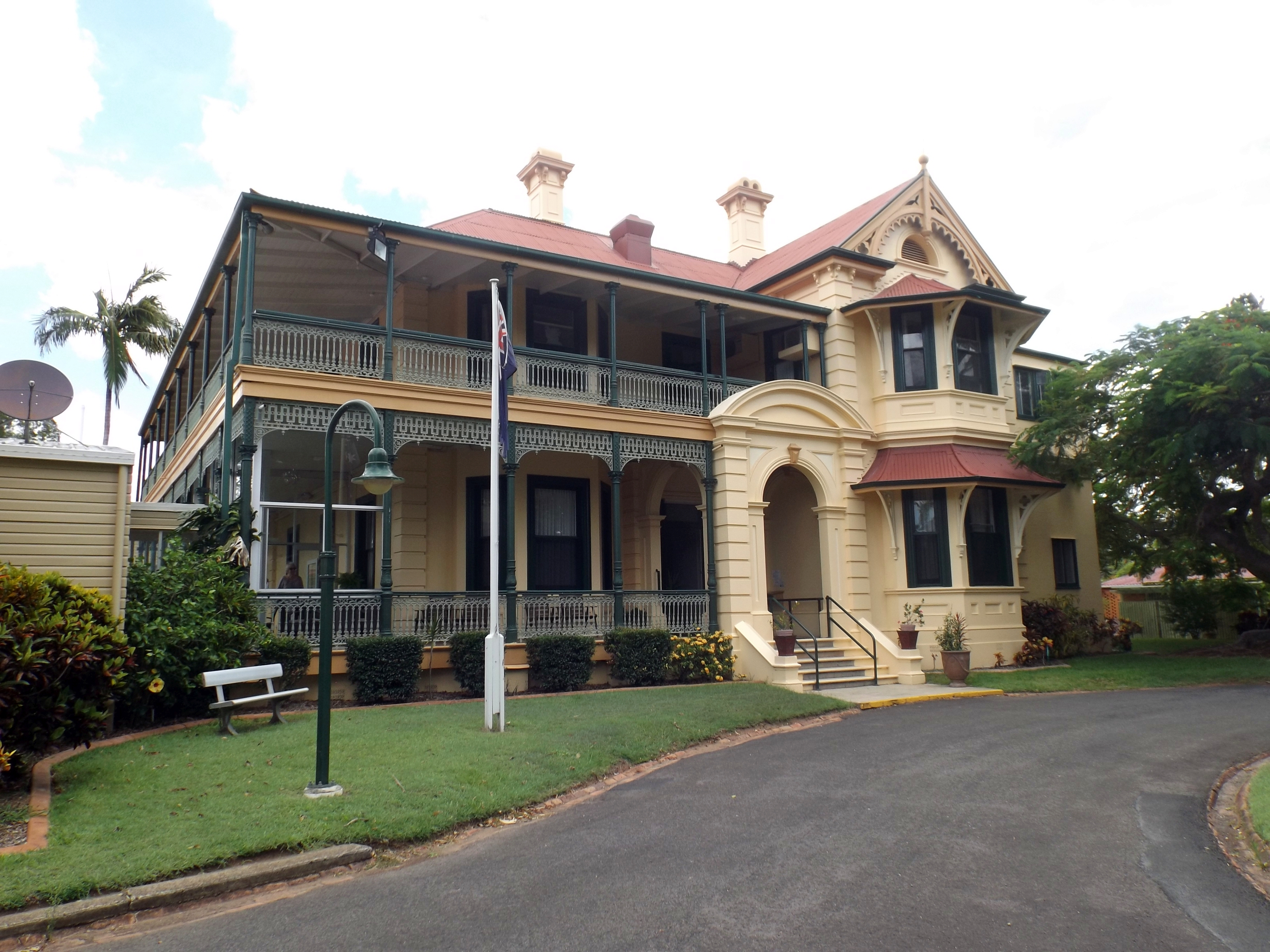
- Building in 2014

- Location within Queensland Location within Australia
- 27.5206°S 152.9711°E
- Location: 85 Bank Road, Graceville, City of Brisbane, Queensland, Australia

History
- Design period: 1870s–1890s (late 19th century)
- Built: 1888–1910s

Site notes
- Architect: Richard Gailey

Queensland Heritage Register
- Official name: Beth-Eden, Rakeevan, Verney
- Type: state heritage (built, landscape)
- Designated: 21 October 1992
- Reference no.: 600215
- Significant period: 1880s (fabric – house); 1900s, 1910s (fabric – garden); 1880s–1920s (historical)
- Significant components: coach house, residential accommodation – main house, stables, garden/grounds

Beth-Eden is a heritage-listed villa at 85 Bank Road, Graceville, City of Brisbane, Queensland, Australia. It was designed by Richard Gailey and built from 1888 to 1910s. It is also known as Rakeevan and Verney. It was added to the Queensland Heritage Register on 21 October 1992.

== History ==
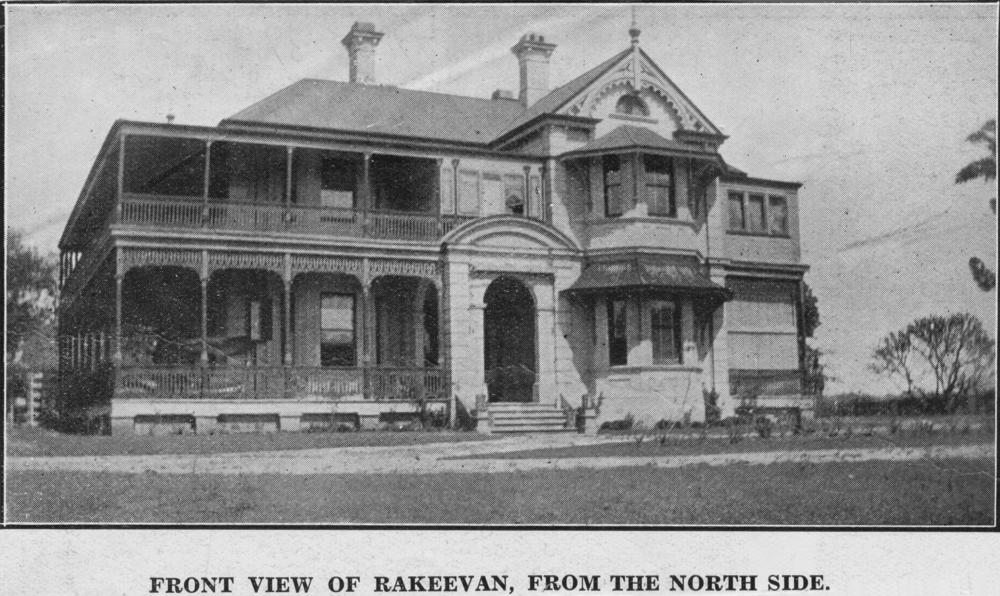
North side of the structure in ~1931

Beth-Eden is a two-storeyed rendered brick house with a weatherboard stables/coach-house, overlooking the Brisbane River. Originally called "Verney", Beth-Eden was erected in 1888 for newspaper proprietor Charles Hardie Buzacott. The architect was Richard Gailey, who in 1884 had designed the Courier Building for Buzacott.

In 1895, John Ferguson (Member of the Queensland Legislative Assembly), a Rockhampton parliamentarian and a major shareholder in the Mount Morgan Mine company, purchased the property, which became the home of his daughter and son-in-law, Mr. and Mrs. A H Chambers. Mr. Chambers was the manager of the Union Bank of Australia and changed the name of the house to "Rakeevan", after his family home in Ireland.

In 1903, Ferguson's other daughter and her husband, Joshua Thomas Bell MLA, took up residence. Bell, from Jimbour Station, held various portfolios and also served as speaker of the Legislative Assembly. In November 1919, the Fergusons loaned Rakeevan for 3 years to the Australian Red Cross to use as a convalescent home for soldiers returned from World War I.

The Ferguson daughters established extensive tropical gardens in the grounds and in 1921 Rakeevan hosted the inaugural Sherwood Shire Agricultural, Horticultural and Industrial Society Show. Most of the gardens have been destroyed by subsequent development.

Rakeevan was lent by Mrs. Bell as a military convalescent home during and after the First World War, following which it stood empty until purchased in the late 1920s by Gulf pastoralist James Stanislaus Kirby. Politician Dr Felix Dittmer was the next owner, and in 1957 he sold the property to the Glad Tidings Tabernacle.

The property was renamed Beth-Eden and officially opened as a retirement home in 1958. The house was modified and associated accommodation and service buildings were constructed. It can now accommodate 61 residents in both one and two-bedroom units.

The only remaining original outbuilding is the stables/coach-house to the southwest of the house.

== Description ==
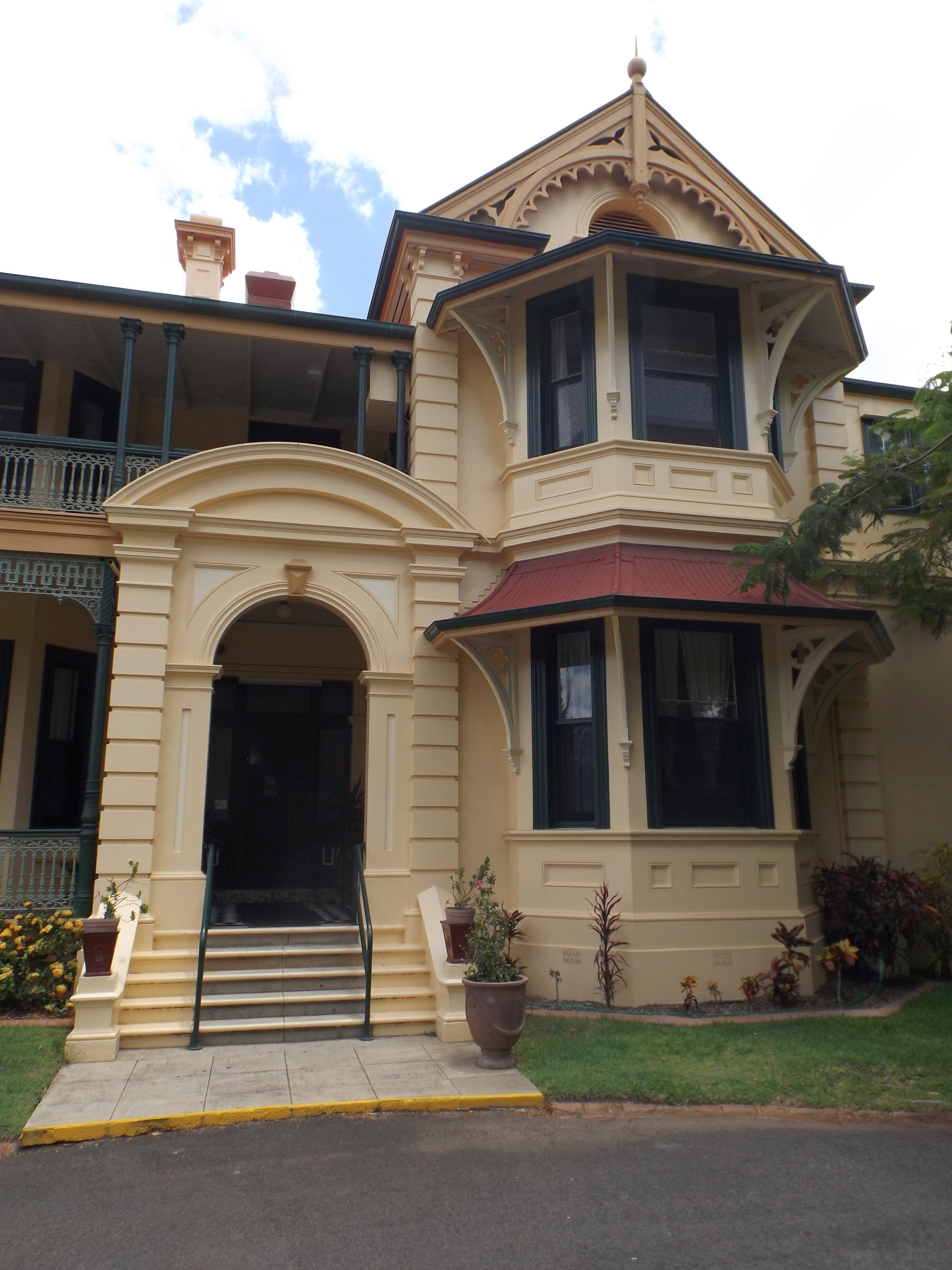
Entrance, 2014

Beth-Eden is a two-storeyed rendered brick house with a weatherboard stables/coach-house overlooking the Chelmer Reach of the Brisbane River. It is surrounded by single-storeyed brick buildings associated with the nursing home.

The corrugated iron hipped roof has projecting gables, two of which surmount bay windows on the northern and western elevations. The bays intercept the double height verandahs which feature on all four elevations. The roof has decorative render to the chimney stacks, eaves and gables.

The verandahs have decorative cast iron balustrading and columns, with brackets and valance on the lower verandah. The northern and eastern verandahs are roofed by a corrugated iron skillion awning, and sections of western and southern verandahs have been enclosed. The eastern verandah has been partially glazed, and a service building connects to the main building via a walkway.

The building has classical mouldings and a pedimented arched portico over the main entrance. The entrance contains black and white marble tiles and decorative sandblasted glass door surrounds and fanlight, on which is written "VERNEY".

The entrance hall contains a carved timber staircase with a large sandblasted glass window at the landing level. Decorative plaster mouldings feature around archways and light fittings. Ground floor public rooms, originally drawing and dining rooms, have marble fireplaces and timber panelling with folding timber doors between. Both floors have been altered with the first floor being used for accommodation and the ground floor for servicing. The building has double hung sash windows, fanlights above internal doors and an elevator has been installed in the entrance hall. The original stables/coach-house is located to the southwest of the main building and now serves as a garage. This weatherboard building has a corrugated iron gabled roof with decorative timber bargeboards and a central hay loft. The building has single skin vertically jointed internal walls and large openings have been cut into the northern facade.

== Heritage listing ==
Beth-Eden was listed on the Queensland Heritage Register on 21 October 1992 having satisfied the following criteria.

The place is important in demonstrating the evolution or pattern of Queensland's history.

Beth-Eden demonstrates an uncommon aspect of Queensland's cultural heritage, containing a now rare late 19th century timber stables/coach-house.

Beth-Eden is important in demonstrating the principal characteristics of a substantial, ornate, two-storeyed, 1880s masonry house, overlooking the Brisbane River.

Beth-Eden is important in exhibiting a range of aesthetic characteristics valued by the community, in particular the quality of the interior design, materials and craftsmanship.

Beth-Eden has a special association with prominent 19th century newspaper proprietor C H Buzacott and with important Brisbane architect Richard Gailey, being an example of his domestic work.

The place demonstrates rare, uncommon or endangered aspects of Queensland's cultural heritage.

Beth-Eden demonstrates an uncommon aspect of Queensland's cultural heritage, containing a now rare late 19th century timber stables/coach-house.

The place is important in demonstrating the principal characteristics of a particular class of cultural places.

Beth-Eden is important in demonstrating the principal characteristics of a substantial, ornate, two-storeyed, 1880s masonry house, overlooking the Brisbane River.

The place is important because of its aesthetic significance.

Beth-Eden is important in exhibiting a range of aesthetic characteristics valued by the community, in particular the quality of the interior design, materials and craftsmanship.

The place has a special association with the life or work of a particular person, group or organisation of importance in Queensland's history.

Beth-Eden has a special association with prominent 19th century newspaper proprietor C H Buzacott and with important Brisbane architect Richard Gailey, being an example of his domestic work.
