= Thomas Murray Hall =

Thomas Hall
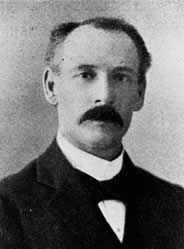

Member of the Queensland Legislative Council
- In office 12 July 1906 – 23 March 1922

Personal details
- Born: Thomas Murray Hall; 25 March 1859 Bootoowaa, Manning River, New South Wales, Australia
- Died: 18 April 1927 (aged 68) Brisbane, Queensland, Australia
- Resting place: Sherwood Anglican Cemetery
- Spouse: Annie Eliza Hulle (m.1881 d.1944)
- Occupation: Accountant

Thomas Murray Hall (25 March 1859 – 18 April 1927) was an accountant and member of the Queensland Legislative Council.

Hall was born at Bootoowaa, Manning River, New South Wales to Thomas Hall and his wife, Janet (née Harrie).

He joined the old Sydney Insurance Company as a Junior clerk in 1880. Within four years he had become chief clerk and accountant of the Imperial Insurance Company. In 1880, Hall was a secretary of the NSW Trade Protection Society in 1882 and was a founder of the Institute of Accountancy.

In 1881, Hall married Annie Eliza Hulle in Sydney and together they had four children. He established a business of his own known as the Hall Mercantile Agency.

In 1888 he came to Brisbane to open a branch of this agency, intending to remain here for only a short period but stayed in Brisbane permanently, and six years later sold out his interests in Sydney and devoted all his energies to his Brisbane business. In local government he became chairmen of the Sherwood Divisional Board, for three consecutive years. In 1899 he became an alderman of the Brisbane City Council, and retained that position for about three years. Hall was appointed to the Legislative Council in July 1906 and served until the council's demise in March 1922.

A vigorous debater and a keen critic of poor finance, he was a consistent supporter of Nationalism. Hall was also Chairman of the Queensland Protestant League.

He supported numerous and varied social activities and sports in the Sherwood Shire. His 30 years of community service embraced eleven local organizations.

Hall died in 1927 at his residence at 'Delbowrie' Donaldson Street, Corinda and was buried in Sherwood Anglican Cemetery.
