= Thomas Park Bougainvillea Gardens =

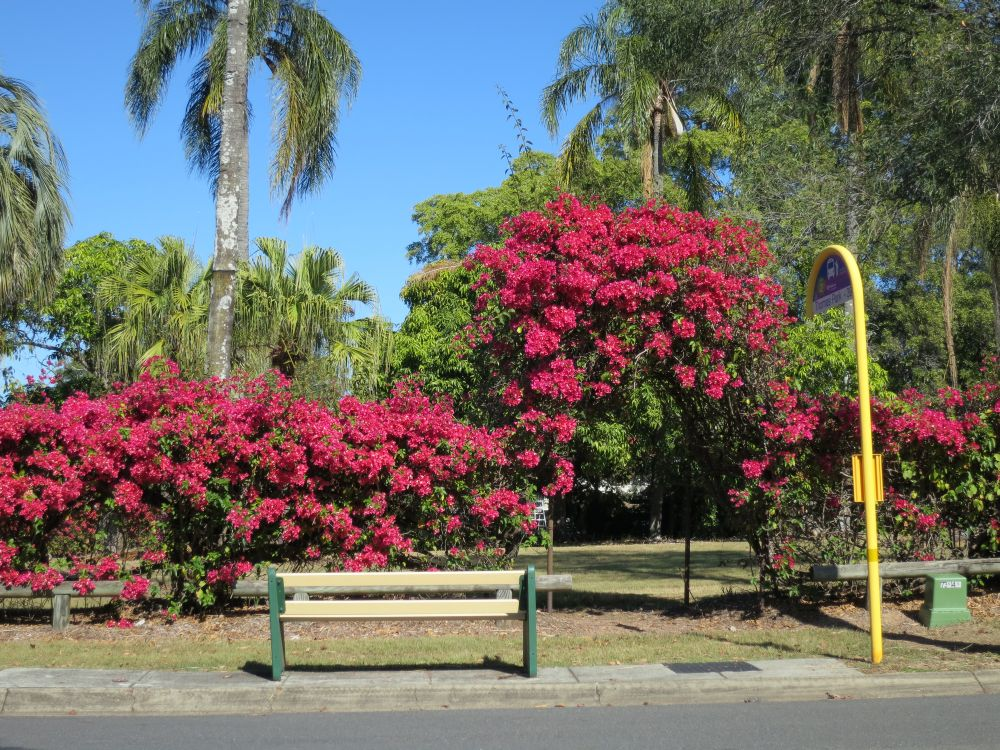
- Thomas Park Bougainvillea Gardens, north boundary, 2014

- Location within Queensland
- 27.5101°S 152.9857°E
- Location: 151 Harts Road, Indooroopilly, City of Brisbane, Queensland, Australia

History
- Built: 1900

Site notes
- Architect: Henry Thomas

Queensland Heritage Register
- Official name: Thomas Park Bougainvillea Gardens;
- Type: state heritage
- Designated: 10 October 2014
- Reference no.: 602838
- Type: Parks/gardens/trees: Garden-private
- Theme: Exploiting, utilising and transforming the land: Experimenting, developing technologies and innovation; Exploiting, utilising and transforming the land: Valuing and appreciating the environment and landscapes

Thomas Park Bougainvillea Gardens is a heritage-listed former private garden and now public park at 151 Harts Road, Indooroopilly, City of Brisbane, Queensland, Australia. It was designed by Henry Thomas and built from 1914 to 1918. It was added to the Queensland Heritage Register on 10 October 2014.

== History ==
The Thomas Park Bougainvillea Gardens, located on Harts Road, Indooroopilly, in Brisbane, were created as a large residential garden by landowner, Henry Thomas from about 1900. For four decades the gardens were a tourist attraction, bringing visitors from throughout Australia and overseas to see their spectacular display of bougainvilleas in flower. During the almost 60 years that Thomas tended the gardens he bred a number of bougainvillea cultivars, which were displayed there. Converted to a park after 1958, the garden's plan and many of its plants are retained and comprise a good example of a large urban-residential garden from the Federation period.

The Long Pocket area of Indooroopilly, in which the gardens are situated, was used for agricultural purposes from the 1860s. Robert Jarrott established an orchard on Portion 67, Parish of Indooroopilly, County of Stanley (about 22 acres or 8.91ha) in 1867, which his son continued after Jarrott's death in 1879. It was subdivided into seven allotments, transferred to Jarrott snr's children and subsequently sold, between approximately 1888 and 1906.

Thomas Park Bougainvillea Gardens, or "Somerset", as it was originally named, comprised Subdivisions 1, 2 and 7 of Portion 67. Sub. 1 of Portion 67 was purchased by Henry Thomas in 1898 or 1899; Sub. 7 was purchased in 1900; and Sub. 2 at an unknown date. The property comprised 7 acres 2 roods 22.7 perches (3.093ha) on the banks of the Brisbane River.

Born in Wellow, Somerset, Thomas arrived in Brisbane on 14 September 1883, as a 19-year-old, unassisted passenger on SS Nowshera. He worked as a groom for the clerk of the New South Wales Legislative Assembly in Sydney, trained racehorses for the Dangar pastoralist family in Armidale and worked as a coachman at Baroona Homestead, Singleton, New South Wales. He returned to Queensland by 1889 when he married his first wife, who died soon afterwards. At the time of his second marriage in August 1894, again in Brisbane, Thomas was employed as a gardener. From about May 1897 until 1909 Thomas operated a livery stable in Adelaide Street, Brisbane.

Thomas created his gardens on the Long Pocket site around the turn of the century. The Australian Women's Weekly in 1950 reported that he had planted a purple bougainvillea 49 years previously. A 1956 newspaper article stated that the mature trees in the gardens, including an 80-foot (24 m) tall Norfolk Island pine, a Moreton Bay fig and several bottle trees, had been planted 60 years previously. This was a slight exaggeration, but photographic evidence from c. 1908-10 shows the garden had established palms and bougainvillea; while Thomas' development of a bougainvillea cultivar named after him, Bougainvillea spectabilis "Thomasii", pre-dates 1905. The Bougainvillea Gardens' beauty was first reported by a newspaper in 1926, implying that they had been planted quite some time before.

The Thomas property included a wedge-shaped residential garden to the north of the site, comprising about a third of the total area, while the remainder of the property was fenced into paddocks leading down to the Brisbane River. A large dam was situated in the top half of the property, below the residential garden.

Located centrally in the western half of the residential garden was the Thomas' house. The gardens were laid out in a formal manner with the boundaries and specific areas within them (drying area, tennis court and vegetable garden to the south east of the house) defined by bougainvillea hedges. This geometric formality was reinforced by linear access ways from Harts Road – a pedestrian pathway and two driveways – all of crushed gravel. The main driveway ran east–west to the house, ending in a turning circle circumscribing a staghorn-bearing palm tree. The pedestrian pathway ran north–south to the front of the residence, while a secondary driveway similarly ran north–south along the western boundary.

The Harts Road frontage was fenced. The earliest known version was a picket fence (c. 1912), replaced later by a painted timber and wire fence (c. 1935).

The Bougainvillea Gardens comprised evergreen trees, such as palms, Ficus, mango and bottle trees; with colour provided primarily by bougainvillea, at least one of which Thomas bred himself, supplemented by crotons, orange crucifix orchids, poinsettia (red and cream), and annuals planted in two garden beds centrally placed in the lawn on either side of the pedestrian footpath.

The pedestrian and main driveway entries were emphasised by archways covered in bougainvillea and a pergola spanned the pathway near the pedestrian entry. Pergola and arches, covered by bougainvillea stood along the west side of the house leading to the rear service area and stables; and steel trellises supported bougainvillea in front of the north side of the house. Large urns stood at the foot of the entry steps to the residence.

From the 1920s until at least 1958, Thomas' Bougainvillea Gardens were a popular tourist destination for locals and visitors to Brisbane from around Australia and overseas; and the site of large garden parties held for funding-raising purposes. In July 1926, Thomas' garden at Indooroopilly was already recognised as a "sight of Brisbane" with interstate dignitaries taken there to admire the "wonderful bougainvillea hedges". In 1927 monies raised from visitors were donated to the Children's Hospital Fund. The first reported garden party was held in September 1929 for St Andrew's Church of England, Indooroopilly, of which Thomas was a member. This annual event continued until at least 1939. These occasions brought hundreds of visitors to the gardens. One garden party to raise money for the St John's Cathedral Fund attracted nearly 3000 people to the gardens in August 1933, and a fete for the Indooroopilly-Taringa branch of the Red Cross Society in 1940 raised £180. By 1940, the Queensland Government Tourist Bureau conducted regular trips to the gardens during the winter tourist season. Visitors included delegates from around Australia visiting Brisbane for conventions; politicians, often bringing guests, such as Elsie Curtin, wife of Prime Minister John Curtin; and notables like photographer Frank Hurley, artist Margaret Preston and actress, Shirley Ann Richards.

In their heyday, Thomas' Bougainvillea Gardens were reported on and featured in newspapers, magazines and books published throughout Australia. Colour spreads appeared in The Queenslander, the Australian Women's Weekly and The Land newspaper. Cinesound produced a newsreel of actress Shirley Ann Richards in the Bougainvillea Gardens in 1937. Photographs of the Gardens were used in photographer Frank Hurley's post-World War II publication Australia Calling! Camera Studies by Capt. Frank Hurley: A Souvenir of Interesting Views and Scenes from All Parts of Australia and as the cover and frontispiece of DA Herbert's early book on sub-tropical gardening, Gardening in Warm Climates published in 1952. Photographs of the gardens were also included in The Queensland Calendar 1961 and the publication, Australia Land of Sunshine.

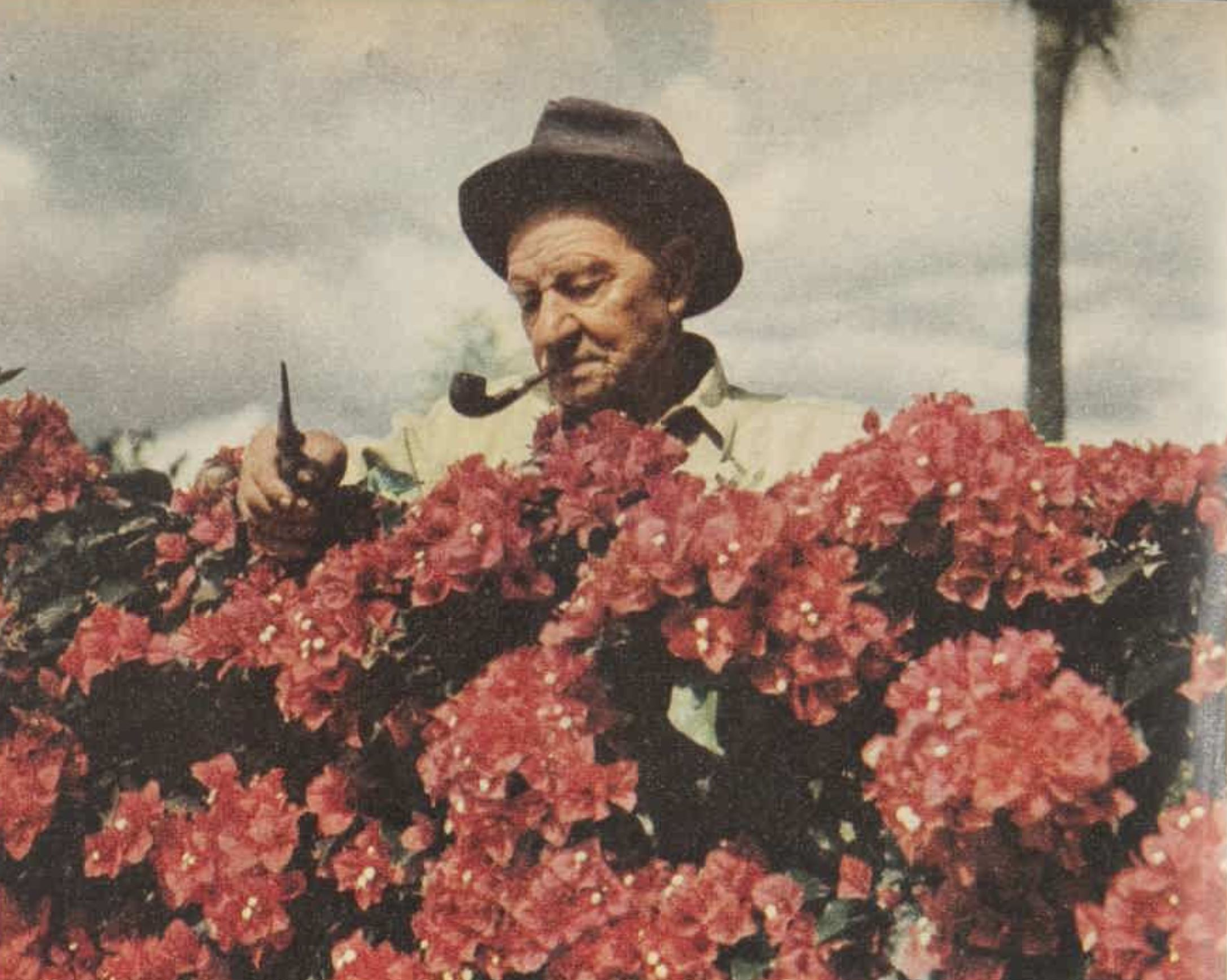
Henry Thomas in his Bougainvillea Gardens, 1950

Henry Thomas was a renowned figure in Brisbane due to his development of the Bougainvillea Gardens and a number of bougainvillea cultivars. On different occasions the media called him "Mr Bougainvillea" and "the Bougainvillea King". Bougainvillea spectabilis "Thomasii", his most well-known cultivar, was distributed around the state and overseas. As one horticultural writer stated, "the variety Thomasii is too well known to need description".

Thomas' Bougainvillea Gardens influenced garden plantings in Brisbane, Queensland and overseas. Newspapers reported other gardens growing B. "Thomasii", e.g. at Glen Kedron and Annerley in Brisbane, and at Gracemere Homestead, and for road beautification on the Rockhampton-Yeppoon Road. B. "Thomasii" was sold by nurserymen who collected cuttings from Thomas' garden. Photographs and media stories also influenced gardeners to grow bougainvillea.

Post-World War II, as part of its programme to increase Brisbane's parkland, the Brisbane City Council (BCC) proposed the purchase of the Bougainvillea Gardens for £5000. Acquisition of the property was part of the Lord Mayor's Long Pocket riverside boulevard and park scheme. Thomas agreed in March 1947, on the condition that the property be acquired for the use of the public and that he be allowed to remain in occupation, as caretaker, for as long as he desired. He also offered his "experience in the preparation of any further plans to beautify the site, without compensation other than full occupation of the house and the paddocks for grazing house cows". The BCC accepted this offer stating that "the property is ...acquired for park purposes for the use and enjoyment of the citizens of Brisbane and visitors to this City and your offer of advice in connection with proposals for the further beautification and development of the area is greatly appreciated". A newspaper report at the time said the show garden had a "world-wide reputation as a beauty spot".

After BCC's acquisition, the Bougainvillea Gardens continued to be used for fund-raising events such as the University of Queensland Women's College Garden Party in August 1948 and its Appeal Fete in August 1950. Afternoon teas also continued to be served daily. Prunings were given to visitors and to a local nurseryman for propagation.

Henry Thomas died in April 1958, ending his curatorship of the gardens. Subsequently, A E Wilson, the BCC's newly appointed landscape architect, was granted a lease of the property, conditional upon his making the Gardens available free to visitors during weekends and on holidays.

By 1962 the BCC had new plans for the gardens and the management of the Long Pocket land it had resumed to form the Sir John Chandler Park. During 1962–63 the Council invited tenders for the development of land forming part of the park, for golf and other recreational facilities. A lease of 20 years was proposed on the understanding that such facilities were to be made available to all sections of the public.

Only one tender was received - from the Indooroopilly Golf Club (IGC) - which did not fully conform to the requirements laid down by the BCC. It was approved in principle and referred for further investigation. Subsequently, in 1962, the Council Administration Board recommended that the IGC be granted a 10-year lease over that portion of Sir John Chandler Park described as Portions 67–73, 75, 77 and 78, Parish of Indooroopilly (about 86 acres or 35ha) on the southern side of Long Pocket. The area known as Bougainvillea Gardens (Lots 1, 2 and 7), along with its residence, was included in the area leased by the IGC. The residence was to be used as a Club House, or for any purposes approved by the Council associated with the development of the Golf Course "during the first 10 years of the golf course's operation, or from 1 January 1964, whichever was the sooner", conditional upon the IGC maintaining all bougainvillea propagation, along with the gardens and their surrounds. At the end of the 10-year lease, the planted area of Bougainvillea Gardens and residence were to revert to the BCC and be excised from the lease.

Brisbane's Lord Mayor, Clem Jones, opened the Indooroopilly Golf Club Long Pocket course on 8 March 1964.

However, continued use of the Thomas' residence by the IGC did not result. By October 1964 the house had been demolished, leaving only "a few bricks and a barren patch of ground". Alderman Greenfield was quoted in the Sunday Mail as saying:

'We pulled the old house down because it was showing its age. Vandals were getting into it. It would have been too costly to repair. We are still negotiating with an organisation about how it will be developed.... It will be parkland and free to the public."

In 1965, the IGC applied to the BCC to lease the land in the lower (southern) section of the Bougainvillea Gardens to expand its golf course. However, the BCC insisted that the IGC comply with the term of its existing lease requiring construction of a football field on the land within the lease for public use, before it would consider the Club's request for an extension of its leased area. The IGC agreed to construct two ovals on the eastern end of its lease for public purposes, so, in early 1967 the BCC granted extension of the IGC's leased area to encompass the Bougainvillea Gardens. The IGC was to maintain the Gardens and permit public access to them between the hours of 10am and 4pm daily, provided that at all times the golf course was safeguarded.

The IGC immediately commenced formation of its new 9th hole on the lower section of the Bougainvillea Gardens, including filling in the Garden's dam located on Sub. 7 of Portion 67. The Club took over the maintenance of the Bougainvillea Gardens from 27 January 1968.

In 1977 a new lease was negotiated over the land used by the IGC. As part of this process, the Long Pocket land was consolidated into two lots - Lot 1 being the land around the Long Pocket Clubhouse and Lot 2 being the remaining area leased to the IGC, comprising the developed golf course.

From 1980, complaints were made to the BCC by descendants of Thomas about the council's failure to maintain the Bougainvillea Gardens and that the land was not being used for public purposes as intended because part of it was used as "a golf course and in the exclusive use and possession of a golf club".

At some time after the agreement that the IGC maintain the Bougainvillea Gardens, this responsibility reverted to the BCC Parks Department, where it remains as at 2017.

The intactness and integrity of the Bougainvillea Gardens has been commented upon by several sources. A Conservation Management Study for Thomas Park undertaken by the BCC in 2002 found that the garden was in a satisfactory condition with much of the design and plantings of the garden surviving. In 2008 a Conservation Management Plan (CMP) was completed for the park by the BCC City Design Team. Original elements of the Bougainvillea Garden, including many plants from the Thomas' period were identified and were assessed as in good condition generally. This report found that the integrity of Thomas Park Bougainvillea Gardens was moderate. A botanical survey of Thomas Park Bougainvillea Gardens in 2014 found that the vegetation survey report by the BCC in May 2008 was comprehensive and since then only five trees have died or been removed from the park, thereby supporting the CMP's assessment of the park's integrity and condition.

In 2014, the original B. spectabilis "Thomasii" and many other Bougainvillea plants, mature trees and palms remain in the park. The layout of Thomas' garden is easily readable after consulting the 1958 plan of the garden. The arch over the pedestrian entry is a remnant structure, as is an early telegraph pole that survives in the north west corner of the gardens.

Removed from the garden are the structures and hard landscaping: house and outbuildings; the last front fence; original boundary fences; pergolas; and most archways. Obscured are all gravel driveways and footpaths. Some plants have been removed or died without being replaced. The IGC excised part of the vegetable garden and most of the lower two-thirds of the property with a six-foot high wire fence, creating a new boundary to the park, when it extended a fairway. This change of boundary disconnected the garden from the Brisbane River, to which it previously had access and views.

Introduced to the park have been park furniture: benches, picnic tables, a bubbler and a bin. Additionally, some new plants have been added or self-seeded.

Although now a park, Thomas Park Bougainvillea Gardens retain sufficient of their original layout and plantings for assessment as a garden. Using the Australian Heritage Commission's classification and assessment methodology for gardens, the garden type the Bougainvillea Gardens most resemble is a Large Urban-Residence Garden in the Federation style. However, they exhibit features also shared by Suburban Gardens and Homestead Gardens. These are: generous size, decorative front gardens and productive rear gardens. Like Large Urban-Residence and Homestead Gardens, the Bougainvillea Gardens had a carriage-way with turning circle. Similar to Homestead Gardens they included avenue planting, a service area and stable block; were sited on flood-free higher ground with views; and were close to permanent water (both river and dam). Common to all three garden types, the Bougainvillea Gardens had a utilitarian garden (vegetable and picking), which in Large Urban-Residence Gardens was often fenced, hedged or walled off.

Common features of Federation style gardens were the architectural elements which differentiated them from earlier styles: fences were varied in design and predominantly painted timber. A pedestrian entry and a service entry featured, with added emphasis given to the visitors' entry by gateway planting, or a lychgate for larger houses. Lattice work, pergolas, gazebos, summerhouses and rose arches were also features. Conservatories, shade houses, bush houses, greenhouses and ferneries in latticed timber and unpainted hardwood were advocated. Nationalism appeared in cut-in garden beds, with some in the shape of the Federation star and others in the shape of Australia. Seats, sundials and elaborate watering equipment were characteristic of the Federation garden, but ornaments were not. The preferred plantings in these gardens were evergreen trees and colourful flowers.

Federation style gardens "retained the plantsmanship of the Gardenesque style and incorporated large lawn areas, but [exhibited] diverse layout styles [from] geometric formality to the dramatized natural style of the "Picturesque"". Thomas Park Bougainvillea Gardens conforms to the Geometric Federation style. The characteristics of this style are:

enclosure by boundary walls, hedges and creeper-covered fences; division of the garden into rectangular spaces close to the house by using trellises, fences, walls, pergolas and hedges; designation of special areas such as the pleasure garden, the kitchen garden, the drying garden, the orchard and the tennis court; terracing, sunken gardens; planting features such as lawns, small trees and shrubs, hedges, topiary, flower beds and borders, edging plants of box and a rosary. A neat look was advocated and sometimes natural vegetation was completely removed.

The cultural heritage significance of Thomas Park Bougainvillea Gardens has been identified in several studies. The 1996 Inventory of Historic Cultural Landscapes in Queensland named Thomas Park Bougainvillea Gardens as one of the "'specific landscapes which were representative of historical cultural landscapes in Queensland". The BCC 2002 Conservation Management Study found the gardens to be of local cultural heritage significance. In 2008 a full Conservation Management Plan found that the Gardens had cultural heritage significance under a number of criteria. In particular, it stated that "[a]s a historic residential garden, the Thomas Park Bougainvillea Gardens has the potential to increase our understanding of garden design in Queensland in the early 1900s".

In 2002, the Oxford Companion to Australian Gardens recognised the significance of the Bougainvillea Gardens:

Throughout the 1920s and 1930s, "Somerset" or Bougainvillea Gardens was a favourite tourist destination, especially during bougainvillea flowering time. Thomas conducted plant breeding experiments and developed the vigorous (carmine-pink) Bougainvillea spectabilis "Thomasii". His gardens featured distinctive Queensland plantings, including palms, shade trees, tropical plants (including 15 cultivars of bougainvillea) and a 25-metre (82 ft) timber trellis festooned with single specimen of B. "Thomasii".

The gardens also featured in the Australian Garden History Society Journal and in 2013, the Australian Garden History Society's report Heritage Gardens in Queensland: a survey of Queensland's parks, gardens, trees and other designed landscapes included Thomas Park Bougainvillea Gardens as a place of state, or potentially state, cultural heritage significance.

In 1996 the Inventory of Historic Cultural Landscapes in Queensland concluded that the Bougainvillea Gardens were an "important exemplar of a private garden that has inspired or still inspires Queensland gardeners and designers". All of the other gardens cited by this study as being important and inspiring private gardens were entered in the Queensland Heritage Register.

== Description ==
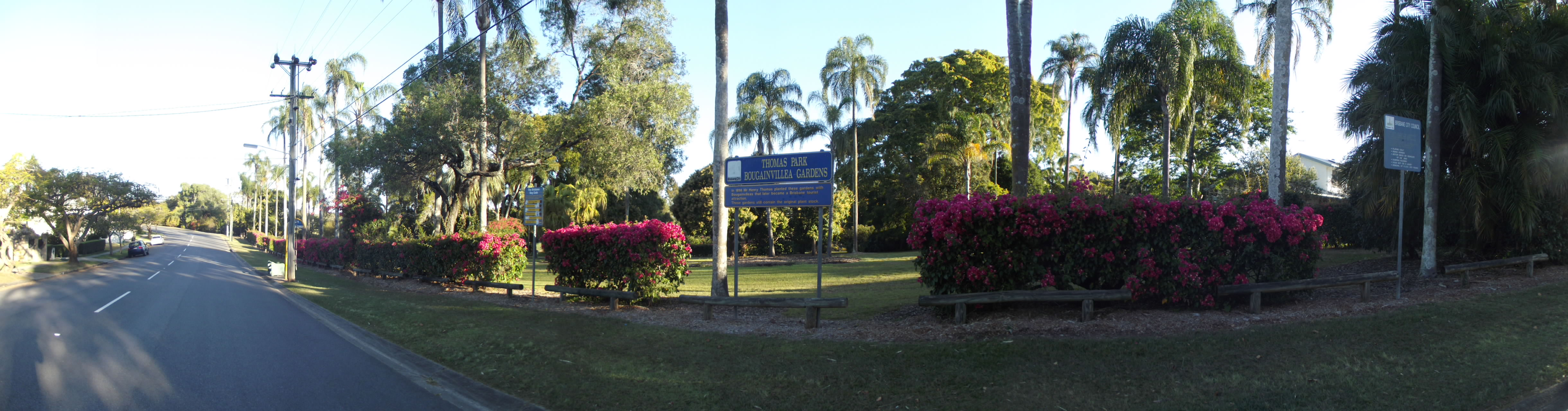
Panorama of the Thomas Park Bougainvillea Gardens, 2012

The Thomas Park Bougainvillea Gardens are a public park occupying a (1.21ha) wedge of land on the southern side of Harts Road, Indooroopilly. The park consists of two distinct parts; the northern residential garden, which contains remnant features and plantings of the former residence Somerset; and the southern sloping lawn which extends south towards the Brisbane River. The park is bounded by private residential properties to the west and Indooroopilly Golf Course to the east. The park and golf course are located on the same lot and separated by a metal pole and cyclone wire fence, which follows an irregular path in a south-west direction from Harts Road. Sweeping views of the golf course and towards the river are obtained from locations in the park, particularly along the south-east boundary.

The most distinctive feature of Thomas Park is its profusion of mature bougainvilleas, which are planted in a variety of configurations throughout the park, including standalone shrubs, long hedges and climbing fences or trees. The bougainvilleas are predominantly the reddish-pink, densely flowering "Thomasii" variety (Bougainvillea spectabilis 'Thomasii'), with a particularly large specimen (the parent plant) located near the former residence site. This type is also formed into long hedges marking the property boundaries and several former garden features. Red, purple, purple-pink, deep pink, white and pink-and-white varieties of bougainvillea can also be found in the park.

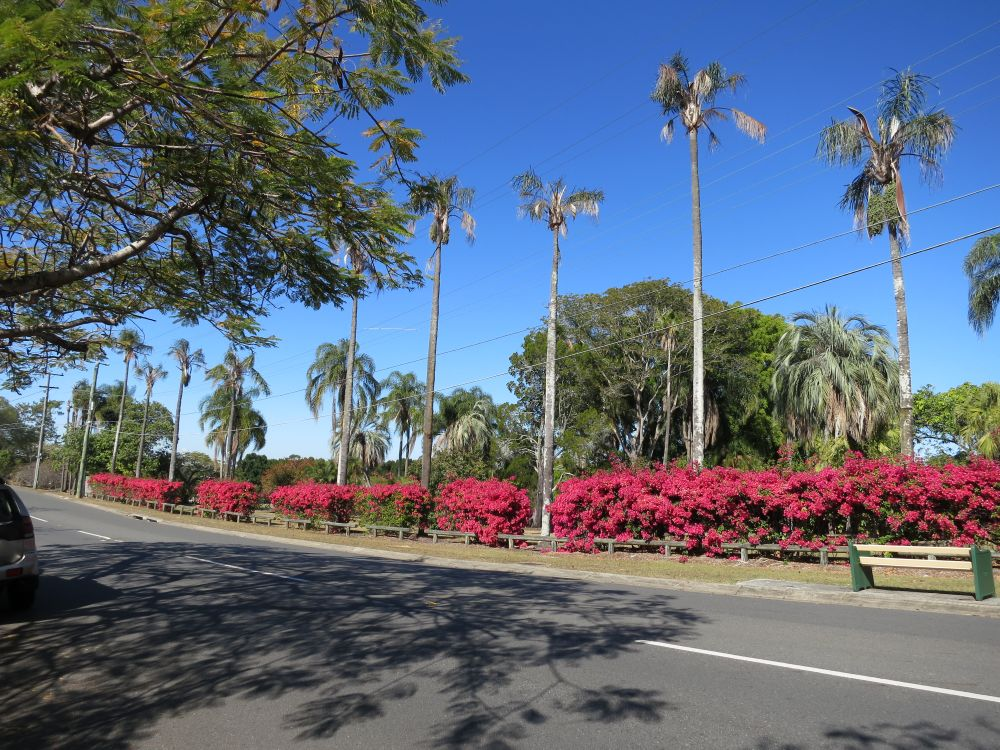
Northern boundary featuring hedges of Bougainvillea, 2014

The northern residential garden is a triangular shaped, gently sloping plateau of land at the highest point of the site. Much of the original garden layout is evident, with remnants of an ornamental garden fronting Harts Road and service gardens along the rear (southern) edge. Linear elements such as two former driveways, a former pedestrian footpath, long hedges and avenues of mature trees form boundaries between different sections of the garden and divide the public ornamental gardens from the private service gardens, which include a former drying area, former tennis court and former vegetable garden. The sites of the former residence and the former stables are discernable as flat, open areas edged with remnant vegetation. Several individual mature trees are landmark elements in the garden design. The southern sloping lawn is an open area bordered by trees, which falls away steeply along the south-east and southern edges.

The Harts Road boundary is defined by large bougainvillea hedges (of the reddish-pink thomasii variety) interspersed with tall, regularly spaced Cocos palms (Arecastrum romanzoffianum). While there are gaps in both the bougainvillea hedges and the palm avenue, the visual effect of this planting scheme remains intact. A metal trellis archway, of narrow metal poles set in concrete footings, stands at the original pedestrian entrance to the gardens, with the bougainvillea on either side trained to grow over it. A low timber log fence along this boundary is not of cultural heritage significance.

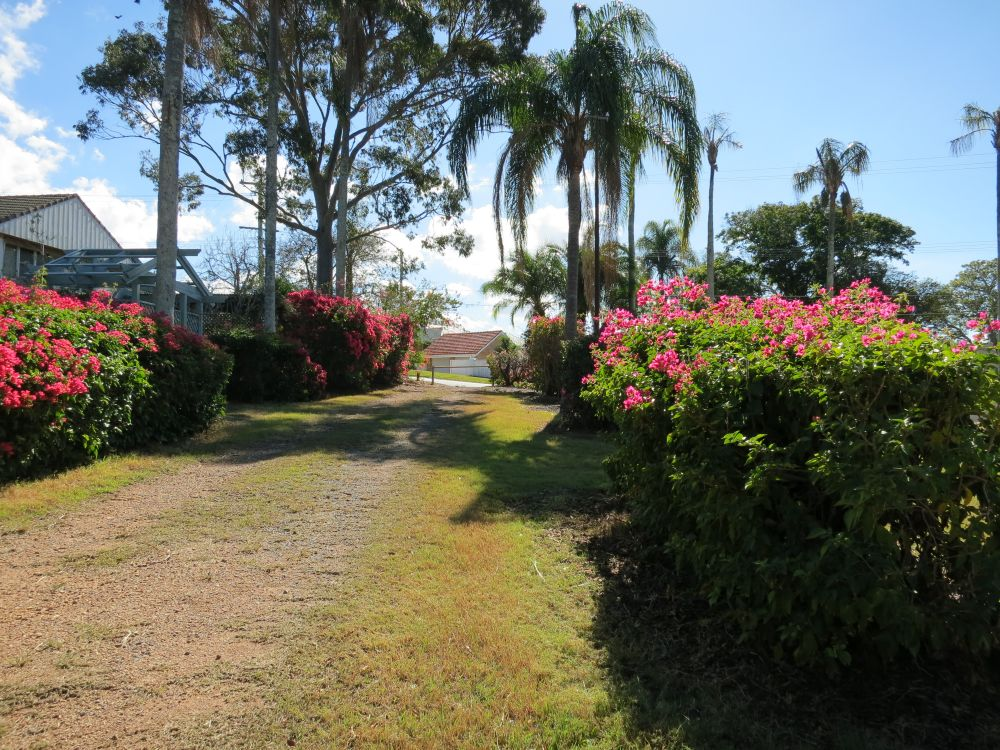
Western boundary, 2014

The western boundary, which adjoins seven residential properties, has a number of mature trees along its length. At the northern end, the boundary is lined with large bougainvillea hedges and regularly spaced Cocos palms. South of this section is a very large weeping fig (Ficus benjamina). Other mature tree species along the western boundary include poinciana (Delonix regia), mango (Mangifera indica), jacaranda (Jacaranda mimosifolia), small-leaved fig (ficus obliqua), and Queensland kauri (Agathis robusta). Dense undergrowth of a variety of plant species exists in places, as well as cleared areas where encroachments by neighbouring properties have occurred. None of these encroaching features, which include garden beds, fenced areas and garden ornaments, are of cultural heritage significance.

The south-east boundary approximately follows the edge of the plateau for much of its length before sloping steeply down towards the southern tip of the site. A number of bougainvilleas and mature trees are planted along its length, including an English oak (Quercus robur), a Bribie Island pine (callitris columellaris), Cocos palms and a large bunya pine (Araucaria bidwillii). The north-east corner of the southern sloping lawn also features several tall, individual bougainvilleas and a large woman's tongue tree (albizia lebbeck).

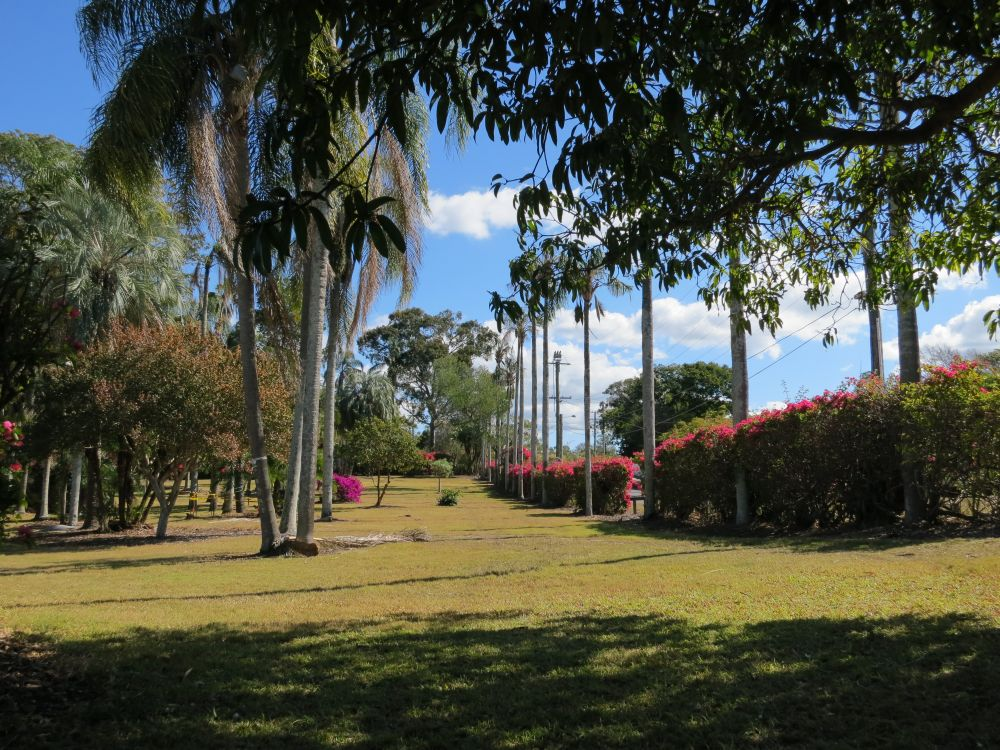
Former main driveway, 2014

The former ornamental garden is a triangular area of lawn bounded on its southern side by the former main driveway and the residence site, and on its western side by a former service driveway. The main driveway commences at the eastern end of the Harts Road boundary following an east–west alignment to what was once a turning circle in front of the residence. The service driveway commences at the western end of the Harts Road boundary and runs south to the site of the former stables. Both driveways retain evidence of their crushed gravel construction, and along the main driveway in particular there is a distinct raised mound in the terrain. The main driveway is bordered on each side by avenues of palms including date (Phoenix dactylifera), dwarf date (phoenix roebelenii), wine (butia eriospatha) and Cocos palms. Remnants of the turning circle include a single centre palm and traces of crushed granite gravel. A modern timber archway spanning the former main driveway supports an original bougainvillea plant with reddish-pink flowers. The service driveway is bordered by bougainvillea hedges on its eastern side. Also along this driveway is a tall metal telegraph pole.

Running north–south through the centre of the ornamental garden is an avenue of trees aligned with the front trellis archway, marking the location of a former pedestrian pathway. This avenue includes cabbage palms (Livistona australis) and date palms. To the west of the pathway is a mulched area and two Cocos palm trees that indicate the location of a former circular garden bed. To the east lies a bougainvillea shrub with purple-pink flowers (possibly a variegated bougainvillea) and a guava tree, which are all that remains of a large wedge-shaped garden bed. A Bribie Island pine is also located in this area.

The former residence site in the south-west corner of the residential garden is a levelled lawn approximately 25 metres (82 ft) long by 17 metres (56 ft) wide with remnant concrete slabs overgrown with grass marking features such as the bottom of stairs leading to the former verandah. The large parent "Thomasii" bougainvillea that once covered the verandah stands on the northern side of the area. It has long, thick branches spreading widely in an east–west direction, supported in places by modern timber frames. Slightly further to the north, a row of mature trees running parallel to the Thomasii bougainvillea includes alternating mango and Cocos palm trees.

The site of the former stables, south-west of the residence site, is a flat lawn area bordered by vegetation. To the east is the former drying area, which is bounded by a row of shrub and tree plantings on the western side (including a bauhinia) and a long bougainvillea hedge on the southern side. Two large Queensland bottle trees (brachychiton rupestris) mark the northern edge of this area and a very large fig tree (Ficus benjamina) marks the boundary between the former drying area and the former enclosed tennis court to the east.

The former tennis court and vegetable garden are located in the south-east corner of the residential garden. Now a single open space, these consist of a long flat lawn area bordered on the northern edge by a dense bougainvillea hedge. Tangled within this hedge are the remains of what appears to be an original fence, namely weathered timber posts and sections of barbed wire. The south-east corner of the former vegetable garden has been truncated by the eastern boundary fence.

Non-significant elements throughout Thomas Park include modern signs, benches and picnic tables, a water bubbler and garbage bin holder.

== Heritage listing ==
Thomas Park Bougainvillea Gardens was listed on the Queensland Heritage Register on 10 October 2014 having satisfied the following criteria.

The place is important in demonstrating the evolution or pattern of Queensland's history.

The Thomas Park Bougainvillea Gardens (c. 1900), with their emphasis on displaying bougainvillea species amid distinctive Queensland plantings of palms, shade trees and tropical plants, are important in demonstrating the evolution of Queensland garden design and planting in the early to mid-twentieth century - popularising bougainvillea as a feature plant in gardens throughout tropical and subtropical Queensland.

The Thomas Park Bougainvillea Gardens are important as the site of early twentieth century innovation in the development of new bougainvillea cultivars; with the parent plant of the most well-known of these, B. spectabilis 'Thomasii', still growing in the park.

The place is important in demonstrating the principal characteristics of a particular class of cultural places.

The Thomas Park Bougainvillea Gardens, are important in demonstrating the principal characteristics of large urban-residence gardens of the geometric Federation style.

These characteristics include: enclosure of the garden by boundary hedges; division of the garden into rectangular spaces close to the house using hedges; designation of special areas such as a pleasure garden, a kitchen garden, a drying garden; planting features such as lawns, small trees and shrubs, hedges and gravel paths. Other characteristics include evergreen trees and colourful shrubs; a pedestrian entry and a service entry, with added emphasis to the visitors' gateway through plantings. They have a plantsman emphasis, specialising in breeding and displaying bougainvillea.

Thomas Park Bougainvillea Gardens retain a sufficient degree of intactness and integrity to show the exceptionality of the original gardens.

The place is important because of its aesthetic significance.

Retaining their plan, mature trees and the bougainvillea plantings that made it a tourist attraction between c. 1920 and c. 1960, the Thomas Park Bougainvillea Gardens are important for their aesthetic significance. They exhibit the beautiful attributes of a well composed formal garden, which uses a single feature plant type, the bougainvillea, to unify its variety of garden elements, which include symmetrical avenues and enclosing border hedges. For decades these gardens were photographed, filmed and written about, and attracted Australian and international visitors.

The place has a strong or special association with a particular community or cultural group for social, cultural or spiritual reasons.

The Thomas Park Bougainvillea Gardens had a special association with the wider Queensland community as a recognised place of beauty from the 1920s to the 1960s, as newspaper and magazine articles, and widely published images of the gardens, show.

The place has a special association with the life or work of a particular person, group or organisation of importance in Queensland's history.

Thomas Park Bougainvillea Gardens have a special association with Henry Thomas, who was a renowned figure in Queensland in the 1920s-50s because of his development of the Gardens and a number of bougainvillea cultivars. He designed and planted the garden c. 1900 and was responsible for creating the cultivar B. spectabilis 'Thomasii', named after him, the original of which still grows in the park.

For almost 60 years Thomas Park Bougainvillea Gardens were the home of Henry Thomas, the site of his horticultural work, and recognised as a significant tourist destination during his lifetime.

== See also ==
- Parks and gardens of Brisbane
