= Jack Draney =

Australian cricketer

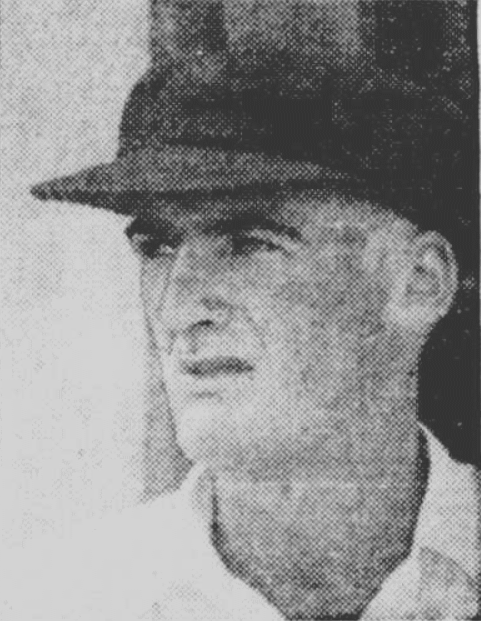

Personal information
- Born: 10 May 1927; Indooroopilly, Queensland, Australia
- Died: October 2011
- Source: Cricinfo, 3 October 2020

Jack Draney (10 May 1927 – October 2011) was an Australian cricketer. He played in two first-class matches for Queensland in 1949/50.

== See also ==
- List of Queensland first-class cricketers
