= Tighnabruaich, Indooroopilly =

Tighnabruaich
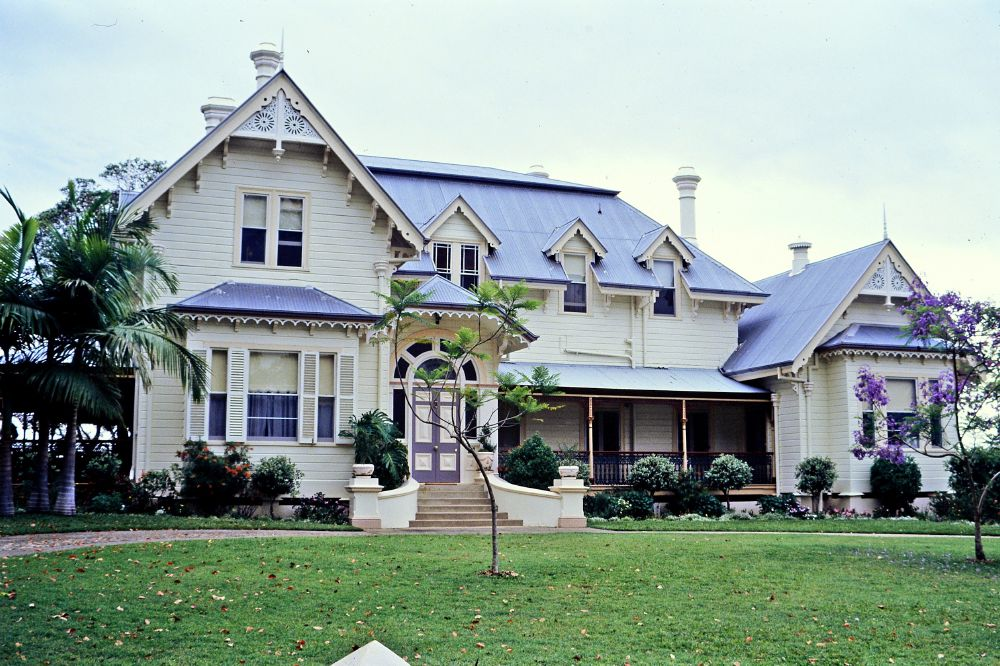
- Tighnabruaich, 1993

- Location within Queensland Location within Australia
- 27.505°S 152.976°E
- Location: 203 Clarence Road, Indooroopilly, City of Brisbane, Queensland, Australia

History
- Design period: 1870s–1890s (late 19th century)
- Built: c. 1889

Site notes
- Architect: Francis Drummond Greville Stanley

Queensland Heritage Register
- Official name: Tighnabruaich
- Type: state heritage (built, landscape)
- Designated: 7 February 2005
- Reference no.: 600229
- Significant period: c. 1889–present
- Significant components: tennis court, trees/plantings, carriage way/drive, basement / sub-floor, service wing, garden/grounds, lawn/s, residential accommodation – main house, natural landscape – riverbank vegetation

Tighnabruaich is a heritage-listed villa at 203 Clarence Road, Indooroopilly, City of Brisbane, Queensland, Australia. It was designed by Francis Drummond Greville Stanley and built around 1889. It was added to the Queensland Heritage Register on 7 February 2005.

== History ==
Tighnabruaich is situated in central Indooroopilly, overlooking the Brisbane River. The house was constructed around 1889 as the home of Henry Charles Stanley, the Chief Engineer for Railways in Queensland. It was designed by his own brother, Francis Drummond Greville Stanley, the former Queensland Colonial Architect. The name of the property evoked the village of the same name, in the Kyles of Bute, in Scotland where the brothers were born. The view of Chelmer, across the Brisbane, could occasionally be reminiscent of the other narrow waterway, its steep banks with lush vegetation and its steam-ferry traffic.

=== The undeveloped estate ===
The land on which Tighnabruaich is situated was once known as Portion 46, Parish of Indooroopilly. It was originally a 42-acre block with a frontage on the Brisbane River and was first sold, at government auction, on 27 September 1859. The original purchaser was James Henderson, but there is little evidence to suggest that Henderson either farmed, or otherwise developed, this land. In April 1873, the portion was transferred to Louis Stamm, a German-born Brisbane businessman who had pursued a wide-ranging career in Queensland since 1855. Stamm was variously a merchant, a newspaper proprietor and a brewery owner.

Despite having been surveyed into farm allotments in 1858, prior to the original auction, central Indooroopilly did not attract agricultural settlement to the same extent as the surrounding river pockets: Fig Tree Pocket, Long Pocket and Indooroopilly Pocket, now known as St Lucia. The area was steeply ridged, covered in dense scrub and its steep river banks did not provide ready access to river transport, the principal means of communication and trade with Brisbane and Ipswich in the mid-19th century. Much of central Indooroopilly remained undeveloped and isolated until the arrival of the Brisbane to Ipswich Railway into the district, in the mid-1870s.

=== The impetus of the railway ===
By October 1873 the Queensland government had determined that the Brisbane to Ipswich railway would cross the Brisbane River at Indooroopilly. The rail corridor would pass through portion 46 and a railway station would be established on part of this portion. In that month a road – Station Road or Indooroopilly Station Road – was surveyed from Moggill Road to the site of the proposed Indooroopilly Railway Station. The segmentation of portion 46 was formalized on a survey plan dated March 1875. The railway corridor and the new road were transferred to the Queensland government the same year. Louis Stamm retained the remainder of portion 46 on 3 subdivisions.

Another government road was duly built, along the eastern boundary of portion 46, and was named Musgrave Rd. Later, this would be renamed Clarence Rd. and would become the main access road for the new house of Tighnabruaich. In April 1875, the government decided to survey and connect this Musgrave Rd. (Clarence Rd.) to the road to Long Pocket, now Indooroopilly Rd. This connecting road was originally called the Indooroopilly Rd., but is now Lambert Rd. In June 1877, an extension westward of this new road was surveyed, cutting through portion 46, to connect the new settlements in the east of the district to Indooroopilly railway station.

Indooroopilly railway station was opened, under that name, in 1875 and it was soon followed by the first railway bridge across the Brisbane River at Indooroopilly, in 1876. This provided a considerable impetus for closer residential settlement in the suburb and a small township developed around the railway station. By the late 1880s, this included a hotel, several shops and a carpenter. In the last quarter of the 19th century a number of fine villas were built along the banks of the Brisbane River, within reasonable proximity to the railway station.

=== The Stanley brothers ===
At some period prior to June 1891, Louis Stamm sold re-subdivision 3, of subdivision 1, to Henry Stanley. This was a block of nearly 9 acres, bounded by the railway line to the west, the Brisbane River to the south, Musgrave Road – Clarence Road – to the east and Indooroopilly Station Road – Lambert Road – to the north. This was the plot on which the house known as Tighnabruaich would be built.

Henry Charles Stanley was born in Edinburgh in 1840. He studied engineering at Edinburgh University and subsequently worked as an engineer in Scotland before emigrating in the early 1860s to Queensland where he was employed as an assistant engineer on the construction of the colony's first railway, between Ipswich and Toowoomba. He was then employed as a railway engineer by the Queensland Government from 1 January 1866 and was appointed Chief Engineer for Railways in 1872. He held this position for nearly three decades, until 1901. Before his new house was built, Henry Stanley lived in the Toowong district, at Ascog in Church Street.

Francis Drummond Greville Stanley was Henry's elder brother and the designer of the house. Francis was born in Edinburgh in 1839 and trained in Scotland as an architect. He emigrated to Brisbane in 1862 and practised privately before gaining employment with the Queensland government in the office of the Colonial Architect, Charles Tiffin, in 1863. Following Tiffin's retirement, Francis Stanley was himself appointed Colonial Architect, from 1 January 1872. He held the position until 1881, but throughout his period of government employment he accepted a number of private commissions. He also continued in private practice in Brisbane, Maryborough and Toowoomba after he left the public service. Stanley was a prolific architect and his work is found throughout Queensland.

If house-design was the speciality of the elder brother, then bridge-building was becoming the speciality of the younger brother. Tighnabruaich's river-frontage overlooked the railway that brought H.C. Stanley to the area, and the Albert Bridge that did so much to assist the development of the district. However, within three years of his taking up residence in the area, that bridge was washed away, in the 1893 Brisbane Floods. It must have given Henry Stanley enormous personal satisfaction to design the replacement bridge and, having done so, to be able to inspect his own bridge each day from his own home, itself a Stanley construction. In 1901, Stanley moved away, with his family, to the district of Hamilton.

=== The grand residence ===
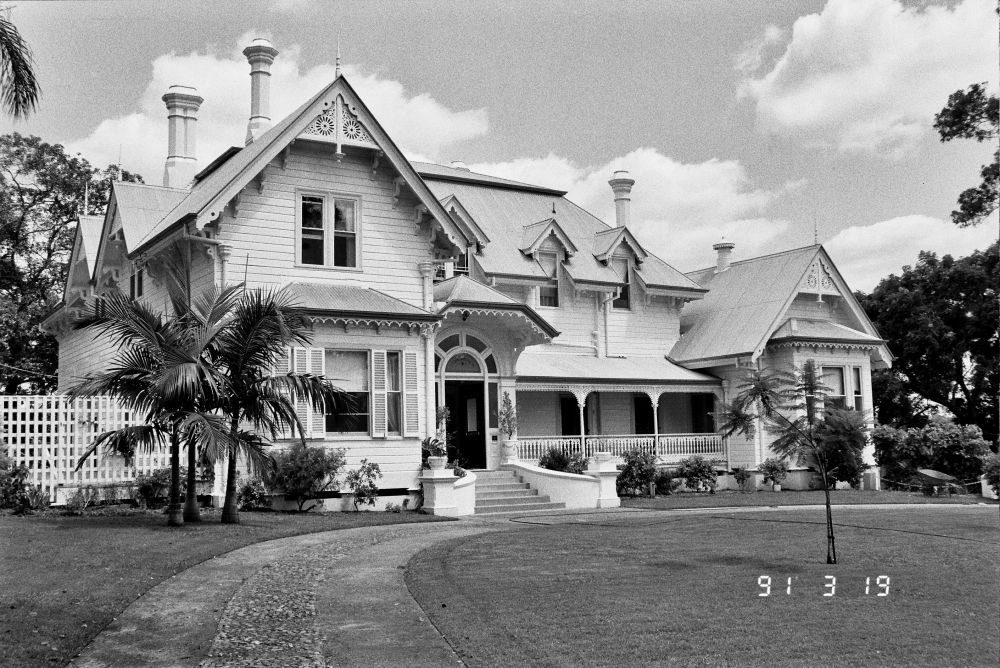
Tighnabruaich, 1991

Francis Stanley's design for Tighnabruaich was a decorative, two-storeyed timber residence with a single-storeyed timber wing and basement. The roof built with a number of steeply pitched gables and dormer windows, a feature popular in other domestic-scaled Gothic revival buildings, and was clad originally with timber shingles. It is thought that the house was erected around 1889, since Henry Stanley is first recorded as being a resident of Indooroopilly in the postal directories of 1890.

The estate was conceived as having the villa set in a park landscape and so, about the time that Tighnabruaich was being built, the rest of the property was cleared of vegetation, with the exception of a few specimen Eucalypt trees. These were later augmented with some Ficus specimens. A typical late 19th century garden was established in the immediate vicinity of the house and the park design was completed with the planting of an avenue of trees along a circular carriageway that connected the property to Musgrave Road, the later Clarence Road.

In 1891, Henry Stanley entered into a curious financial arrangement with New South Wales grazier Solomon Wiseman, who held title to Tighnabruaich from June that year and who took out a substantial mortgage on the property from the Queensland Investment and Land Mortgage Company. The memorandum of transfer associated with this transaction also records that Stanley had purchased the land from Stamm for £3,100. Wiseman later subdivided the property and four subdivisions fronting Clarence Road were sold around 1900. A Lambert Road subdivision was sold around 1904. Following Wiseman's death in late 1901 the property became the responsibility of trustees. At this time, with the owners of the house, the Stanleys, having left and with Wiseman, the landowner, having died, Tighnabruaich was used briefly as a boarding house for the Bowen House Boys' School, located in Ann Street.

=== The Hemming family ===
On 6 February 1904, the house was sold to Herbert Brealey Hemming, for the sum of £2200. It was sold with 8 acres, 1 rood and 7.2 perches of land: the total of subdivisions 1–2 and 8–14. Hemming was a leading solicitor in the State of Queensland, an eponymous partner in the distinguished Brisbane legal-practice of Wilson, Newman Wilson and Hemming. He lived at Tighnabruaich, with his family, until around 1915 or 1916. During this period, tennis parties were regular feature of life at Tighnabruaich.

At this time there was also a move to put the large grounds were put to some commercial use. Dairy cattle were grazed on part of the land and part of the basement of the house was given over to a milking-parlour and dairy.

However, as the family grew up, even the house exceeded requirements and they moved out of the main house, to Witton House, newly located on the estate. From around 1915 or 1916, the main house was leased to Mrs Emma McGill, who operated it as a boarding house for a decade, until the mid-1920s. The house then appears to have remained vacant for nearly two decades, from that period onwards until the military requisitioned it for use during the Second World War. There is a suggestion that Tighnabruaich served as a private hospital in the late 1930s, under a Dr. Underwood, but details of this period are sketchy.

An article written for The Queenslander in 1932 described various elements of the grounds of Tighnabruaich, including: some "fine old gum trees" in the cow paddock adjacent to the railway line; entrance gates to Clarence Street giving access to a drive lined by camphor laurels; a tennis court to the south east of the drive; hedging, steps to the lower grounds, accessed through a creeper-clad archway; and some "fine Jacarandas and other flowering trees".

=== Witton House ===
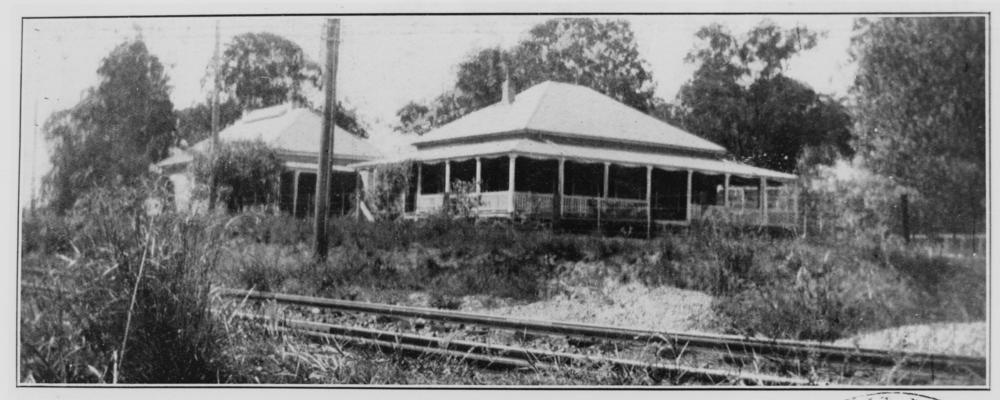
Witton House, in the grounds of Tighnabruaich, circa 1932

Mr. Hemming's impressive property portfolio included another house, Witton Manor, which was also located in Indooroopilly, though further upstream. The grounds of Witton Manor became, for many years, the junior school of St Joseph's College but are now the site of Ambrose Treacy College.

Between 1916 and 1919, Witton Manor was moved – the detail of the not-inconsiderable enterprise is sadly missing – from its original site and onto the extensive grounds of Tighnabruaich. It was positioned in the south west corner of the park, facing the river, and was renamed Witton House. Hemming himself then resided at Witton House from at least 1919 until around 1938. Witton House was eventually demolished in 1967.

Following Hemming's death on 8 March 1942, the Tighnabruaich properties were administered by Queensland Trustees Limited on behalf of the Hemming estate.

=== The Second World War ===
From about October 1942, the property was requisitioned for use by the military. Tighnabruaich became the main base of a joint United States-Australian intelligence unit: the Allied Translator and Interpreter Section (ATIS), associated with the Combined Services Detailed Interrogation Centre. These units directed the handling of captured Japanese prisoners and documents. During the war many huts and tents were assembled on the grounds for use by American soldiers; brick cell blocks were constructed in the center of the property, north west of the main house, to accommodate Japanese prisoners of war being held for interrogation; two interrogation rooms were erected to the immediate east of the main house; an Orderly's Office was established on the north west side of the main driveway off Clarence Road; a translation room was erected on the tennis court; Witton House functioned as the Sergeants' Mess; and Tighnabruaich was partitioned for office accommodation. The roof of the eastern verandah of Tighnabruaich was removed during this period. ATIS vacated Tighnabruaich about July 1945.

=== Postwar transition ===
Toward the end of the war, the Australian Army decided to hold on to Tighnabruaich: the property was transferred to the Commonwealth of Australia on 13 June 1945.

From mid-1945 until July 1946 it functioned as an Australian Women's Army Service barracks. During this period, the main house was used as an officers' mess and Witton House accommodated the non-commissioned officers. The other ranks occupied the huts and tents in the grounds.

From 1946 to 1949, the property was used solely for administrative buildings.

In 1949, the main house was converted into two flats to accommodate senior Army officers. At this time, the original eastern verandah was removed to allow for the installation of a staircase to the upstairs flat.

By July 1951 the translators' room had been removed from the tennis court and in 1955 a small timber tennis shed or storeroom was erected adjacent to the court.

From 1951, the estate was divided into separate elements: the main house, and other establishments set up in the grounds. The main house was restored to single occupancy, as a general's residence. Within the grounds stood two separate barracks: Witton Barracks and Indooroopilly Barracks.

=== Commander's residence ===
From January 1951 until mid-1998 Tighnabruaich, the main house of the old estate, served as the home of the General of Command, Northern Command, Australian Army, and later: Commander, 1st Division. After 1957, major works were carried out on Tighnabruaich, to restore it to being a prestige residence: suitable as a family home for the general and his dependents, but suitable also for the entertaining of guests, as required of senior army officers. From this period, many of the alterations made between 1942 and the 1950s were replaced with original or reconstructed fabric. A carport was added to the house in 1958 and in 1962 a lavatory was installed on the ground floor, under the main staircase. The outside staircase to the former upstairs flat was removed in 1966 and the eastern verandah was reconstructed. Between January 1951 and March 1998, some 20 generals took up residence in Tighnabruaich, together with their families. During this period a tradition was established, whereby each family planted a tree on the property.

=== Private house ===
In 1998, the site was formally subdivided by the Commonwealth. The Commonwealth retained the grounds of the property, but Tighnabruaich house, on a reduced 1.19-hectare (2.9-acre) plot, was sold freehold to private owners. The grounds associated with Tighnabruaich house retain the river frontage, the early circular carriageway and the mature trees lining this drive, plus the tennis court and the trees planted by the generals resident since 1951. Any military evidence of the Army's presence on this site has since been removed. Tighnabruaich is currently occupied as a private home.

== Description ==
The house of Tighnabruaich occupies a block of 1.19 hectares in central Indooroopilly. The property has frontages to the Brisbane River and to Clarence Road and access to the house is via a circular driveway leading from Clarence Road. The house is a timber-framed building set on brick piers. It is positioned overlooking the river to the south.

The house is asymmetric in both plan and elevation. The main part of the residence is two-storeyed, with a single-storey, L-shaped wing on the western side. The fall of the land towards the river provides space for a brick basement under the single-storeyed section. The whole has a corrugated iron clad roof comprising a series of gables and dormer windows. Single-storey verandahs are found on the northern and southern elevations of the building and along the entire length of the eastern elevation.

The principal point of entry to the building is in the north elevation, where an elaborate covered porch provides shelter for the main entrance. This consists of a six-panelled cedar door with semi-circular fanlight and sidelights.

Generally the interior of the house has plaster ceilings, timber boarded floors and very fine stained-cedar joinery. The stud walls are clad with chamferboard externally and lath and plaster internally. Most doorways have operable fanlights above.

The ground floor contains a number of large public rooms with bay windows and French doors, arranged around a central stair hall. An entrance vestibule with a tessellated tiled floor leads to the stair hall through an arched opening filled with a carved timber screen. Plaster archways provide access to the major rooms on the ground floor and these rooms have plaster ceiling roses and deep plaster cornices.

The central stairway is an open well with a half-turn timber flight with landings and has very fine cedar joinery including turned balusters, prominent newel posts and spandrel panelling.

The upper floor of Tighnabruaich has a number of smaller rooms, again opening off the central stair hall and off halls radiating from this. Some of the upper floor rooms have partially raked ceilings of plasterboard, following the line of the roof trusses.

The grounds include large areas of lawn to the north of the house, the early carriageway lined with mature trees and a tennis court to the east of the drive. At the southern end of the site the ground slopes steeply to the river, the bank being heavily vegetated.

== Heritage listing ==
Tighnabruaich was listed on the Queensland Heritage Register on 7 February 2005 having satisfied the following criteria:

The place is important in demonstrating the evolution or pattern of Queensland's history

Tighnabruaich is a large, two-storeyed timber residence constructed around 1889 for Henry Stanley, Chief Engineer for Railways in Queensland, to a design by his brother, the former Colonial Architect Francis Stanley. The place is important in demonstrating the pattern of growth of Brisbane, specifically at Indooroopilly, where middle-class suburban residential development was attracted to the district after the opening of the Indooroopilly Railway Station, in 1875. As one of a group of substantial, late 1880s residences constructed in Brisbane, Tighnabruaich also contributes to our understanding of the nature of the Queensland economic "boom" of this period. The property is also significant for its military associations, initially with the work of a Section of the Allied Intelligence Bureau during World War II and then, during the second half of the 20th century, as the showcase residence of the officers commanding the Australian Army in Queensland.

The place is important in demonstrating the principal characteristics of a particular class of cultural places

The house in its garden setting remains comparatively intact and a good example of a well-designed 19th century middle-class villa. It is important in demonstrating the principal characteristics of its class, including planning, use of materials, decorative detailing, riverside location and the retention and layout of the grounds, including the early carriageway, tennis court and plantings. The building is a fine example of the mature domestic work of F.D.G. Stanley and contributes to the body of knowledge about the work of this prolific and influential Queensland architect.

The place is important because of its aesthetic significance

The building has aesthetic value as a well-composed, picturesque residence influenced by Gothic revival architecture popular during the second half of the 19th century. It contributes to the townscape of Indooroopilly and is a landmark along the Brisbane-Ipswich railway.

The place has a special association with the life or work of a particular person, group or organisation of importance in Queensland's history

Tighnabruaich has a special association with the Australian Army, as the residence of the generals commanding the Army in Queensland for close to half a century; trees planted by the resident generals remain as evidence of that association.
