= Greylands, Indooroopilly =

Greylands
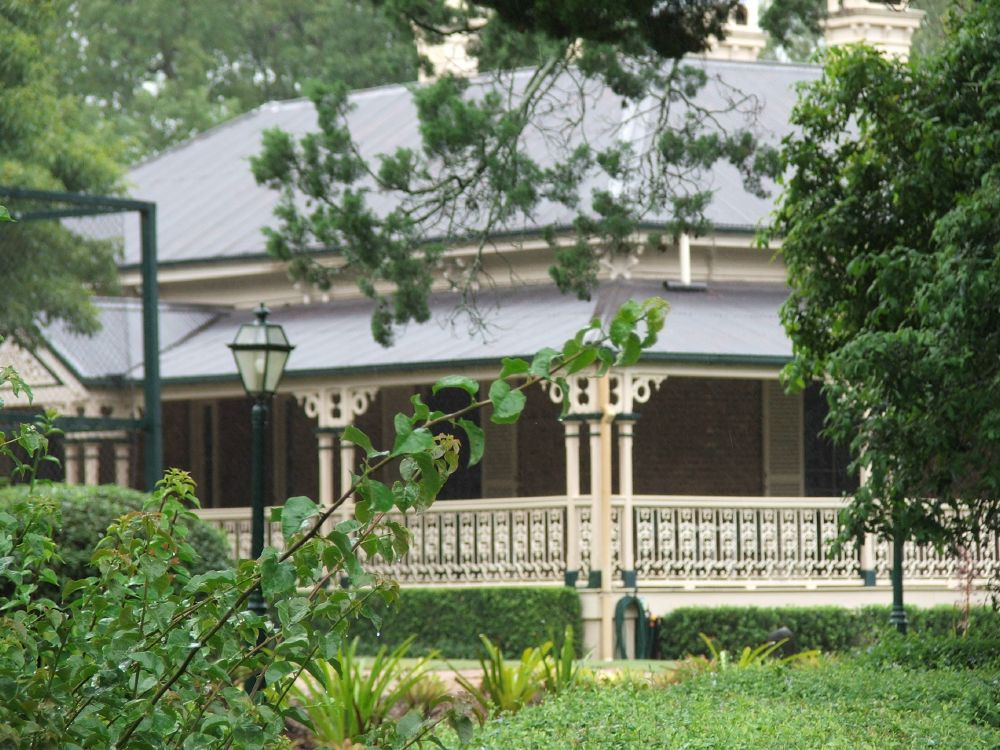
- Greylands, 2009

- Location within Queensland Location within Australia
- 27.5065°S 152.9814°E
- Location: 47 Dennis Street, Indooroopilly, City of Brisbane, Queensland, Australia

History
- Design period: 1870s–1890s (late 19th century)
- Built: c. 1876

Site notes
- Architect: John Hall

Queensland Heritage Register
- Official name: Greylands
- Type: state heritage (built, landscape)
- Designated: 21 October 1992
- Reference no.: 600230
- Significant period: 1870s (fabric); 1870s–1890s, 1910s (historical)
- Significant components: basement / sub-floor, garden/grounds, residential accommodation – main house, carriage way/drive

Greylands is a heritage-listed villa at 47 Dennis Street, Indooroopilly, City of Brisbane, Queensland, Australia. It was designed by John Hall and built c. 1876. It was added to the Queensland Heritage Register on 21 October 1992.

== History ==
The site was part of a parcel of land purchased by Thomas Lodge Murray-Prior in 1859. In 1876, his friend Graham Lloyd Hart, a city lawyer, purchased a subdivided portion of 43 acres (17 ha) and in the following year built Greylands. It is likely that Brisbane architect John Hall designed the house. The family resided at Greylands until Hart's death in 1897 except for a period in the 1880s when they lived on Wickham Terrace.

While it is unclear who owned the property next, it is likely that Queensland National Bank, which had been mortgagee for the Harts, took over the property. John Piper McKenzie, manager of the Bank's Brisbane Office lived there from 1900–1908. The next tenant was David Lahey, timber merchant, who leased the house from 1910–1912. His daughter Vida Lahey painted the Monday Morning laundry scene at Greylands which hangs in the Queensland Art Gallery.

The residence was bought by Bank employee Alfred Dennis in 1912 and the estate was gradually subdivided. Dennis is credited with demolishing the old wooden wings and stables at the back, with building a new extension of five rooms and providing the tennis court. On his death in 1944 the property was sold to Norman Pixley and ultimately to the Power family in 1984, who refurbished the property.

== Description ==
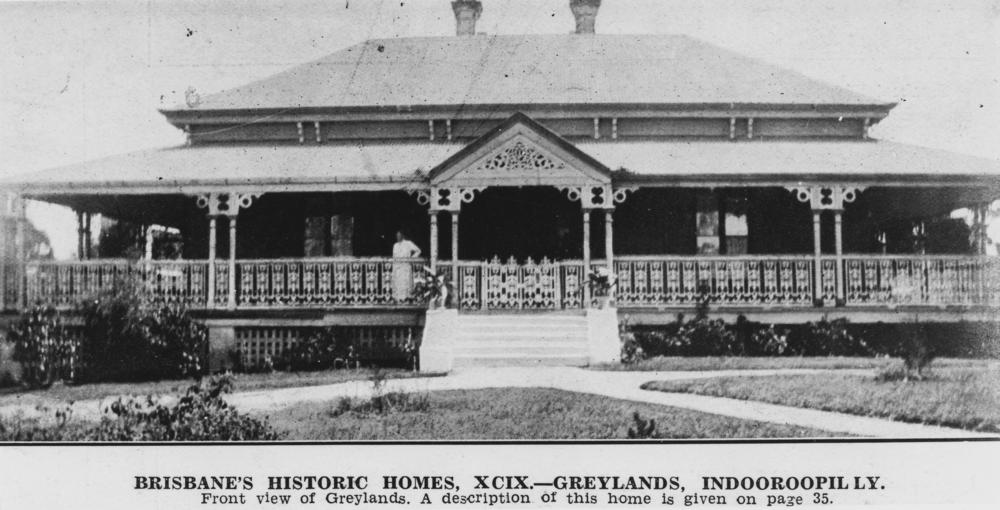
Greylands, circa 1932

The original portion of Greylands is a brick building, single-storeyed at the front and double at the rear. The plan is symmetrical about a wide hallway which features a central screen with double doors. Two rooms on the right are divided by a set of folding doors. On the other side of the hallway are two bedrooms. Joinery throughout is of cedar, and all fireplaces retain their mantelpieces of marble, grates and hearths. Floors in each room are edged in cedar.

Original lath and plaster ceilings have been replaced, though plaster cornices remain in all rooms. In the sub-floor at the rear are five small rooms which were used as servants' quarters and a laundry. Externally the house features a fretwork pediment over the front steps.

Wide verandahs with cast-iron balustrading extend across the front and along two sides. The verandah roof is supported by paired verandah posts on brick piers, and separated from the main hipped roof of corrugated iron by a cornice with paired console brackets.

== Heritage listing ==
Greylands was listed on the Queensland Heritage Register on 21 October 1992 having satisfied the following criteria.

The place is important in demonstrating the evolution or pattern of Queensland's history.

One of the earliest villa residences in the Indooroopilly area, and a dignified example of 1870s design, the house and its setting provide a glimpse into the way of life of Brisbane's professional and business families.

In addition to its elegant exterior form, the house displays craftsmanship and detailing of a high standard including its cedar joinery and other interior decoration. Its appeal is enhanced by the retention of almost 5000 square metres of landscaped grounds which are free from urban intrusion.

Greylands was the home of Graham Lloyd Hart, founder of law firm Flower & Hart which has been prominent in Brisbane legal circles since the 1870s. That this was the location of Vida Lahey's much admired painting of women working in the laundry, Monday Morning, adds social import to the house

The place is important in demonstrating the principal characteristics of a particular class of cultural places.

One of the earliest villa residences in the Indooroopilly area, and a dignified example of 1870s design, the house and its setting provide a glimpse into the way of life of Brisbane's professional and business families.

The place is important because of its aesthetic significance.

In addition to its elegant exterior form, the house displays craftsmanship and detailing of a high standard including its cedar joinery and other interior decoration. Its appeal is enhanced by the retention of almost 5000 square metres of landscaped grounds which are free from urban intrusion.

The place has a special association with the life or work of a particular person, group or organisation of importance in Queensland's history.

Greylands was the home of Graham Lloyd Hart, founder of law firm Flower & Hart which has been prominent in Brisbane legal circles since the 1870s. That this was the location of Vida Lahey's much admired painting of women working in the laundry, Monday Morning, adds social import to the house
