= Indooroopilly =

- Suburb
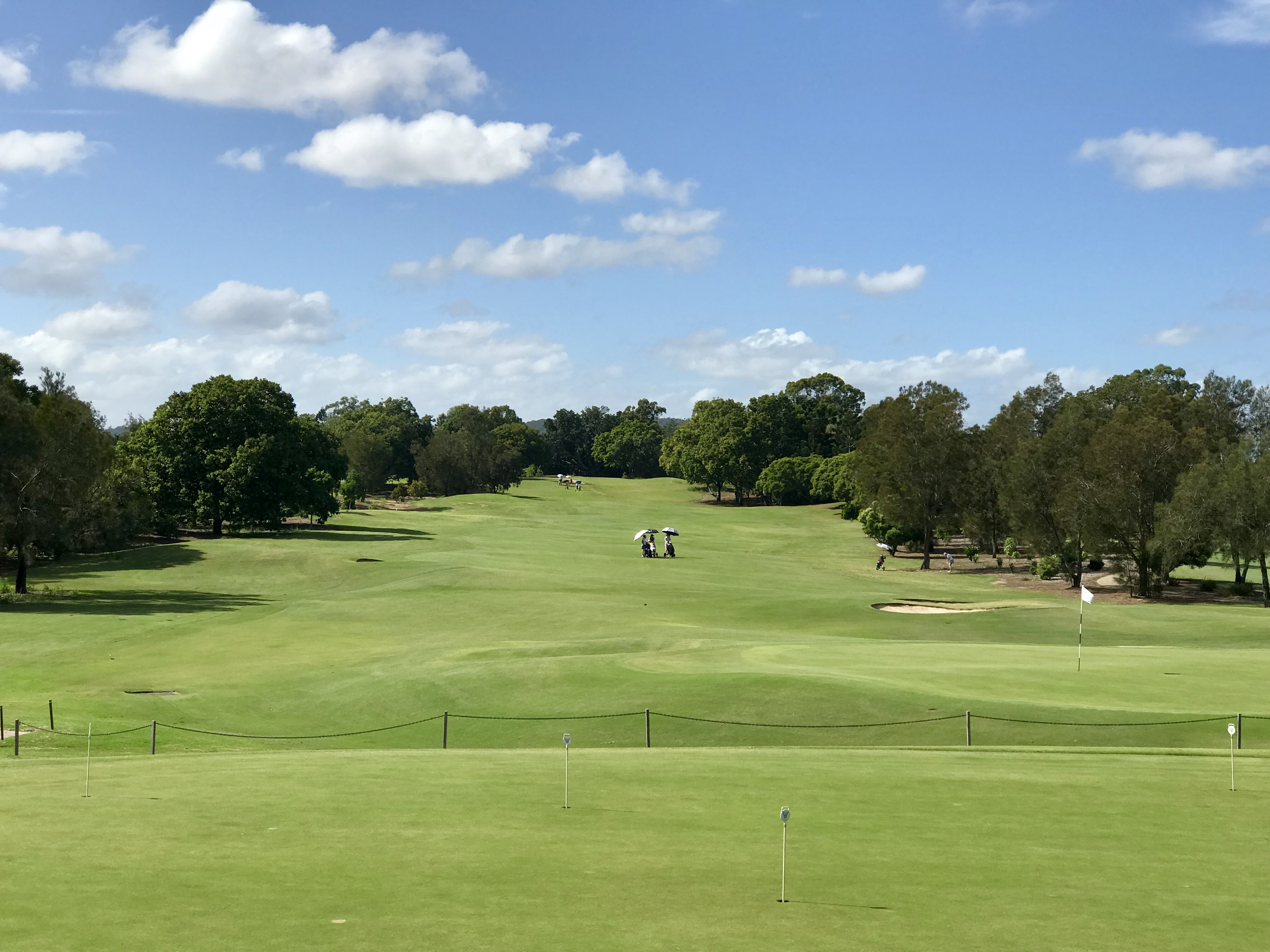
- Indooroopilly Golf Club, Indooroopilly, Queensland

- Interactive map of Indooroopilly
- Coordinates: 27.5038°S 152.98°E
- Country: Australia
- State: Queensland
- City: Brisbane
- LGA: City of Brisbane (Walter Taylor Ward)
- Location: 7.8 km (4.8 mi) SW of Brisbane CBD

Government
  - State electorates: Maiwar; Moggill
  - Federal division: Ryan

Area
  - Total: 7.8 km^{2} (3.0 sq mi)

Population
  - Total: 13,622 (SAL 2021)
- Time zone: UTC+10:00 (AEST)
- Postcode: 4068
Suburbs around Indooroopilly
Mount Coot-tha	Taringa	St Lucia
Chapel Hill	Indooroopilly	Yeronga
Fig Tree Pocket	Chelmer	Graceville; Tennyson

Indooroopilly (/ˌɪndrəˈpɪli/ IN-drə-PIL-ee, colloquially Indro /ˌɪndroʊ/ IN-droh) is a riverside suburb 7.8 kilometres (4.8 mi) south-west of the Brisbane CBD, Queensland, Australia. In the 2021 census, Indooroopilly had a population of 13,622 people.

== Geography ==
Indooroopilly is bounded to the south and south-east by the median of the Brisbane River. Indooroopilly is connected to Chelmer on the southern bank of the river by four bridges, consisting (from east to west) of a pedestrian/cycling bridge (Jack Pesch Bridge), two rail bridges (Albert Bridge and Indooroopilly Railway Bridge), and one road bridge (Walter Taylor Bridge, 27.5058°S 152.9736°E).

The suburb is designated as a regional activity centre.

Indooroopilly has significant commercial, office and retail sectors and is home to Indooroopilly Shopping Centre, the largest shopping centre in Brisbane's western suburbs. The suburb is popular with professionals and a large number of university students from the nearby University of Queensland campus in St Lucia. The housing stock consists of a mix of detached houses and medium density apartments. There has been a trend towards increasing small lot and townhouse development in the suburb in recent years. Nevertheless, many post-war homes and iconic Queenslanders have also been restored. Brisbane City Council regulations to preserve the 'pre-war' look of Brisbane discourage destruction of many of Brisbane's Queenslanders and buildings. It is one of the Brisbane City Council's proposed Major Centres.

== History ==
The name Indooroopilly has been the subject of debate, but is most likely a corruption of either the local Aboriginal word nyindurupilli, meaning 'gully of the leeches' or yindurupilly meaning 'gully of running water'.

The traditional owners of the Indooroopilly area are the Aboriginal Jagera and Turrbal groups. Both groups had related languages and are classified as belonging to the Yaggera language group.

The parish was named in the late 1850s, and a house was built in 1861 by Mr H C Rawnsley called Witton Manor.

Toowong Mixed State School opened in 1870. In 1879 it was renamed Indooroopilly State School. In 1888 it was renamed Indooroopilly Pocket State School. In 1905 it was renamed Ironside State School, which is now in the suburb of St Lucia (and is not the current Indooroopilly State School).

The ground for the Indooroopilly Primitive Methodist Church (in the part of Indooroopilly now known as Chapel Hill) was officially broken in a ceremony on Monday 10 November 1873. The church opened on Sunday 28 March 1875.

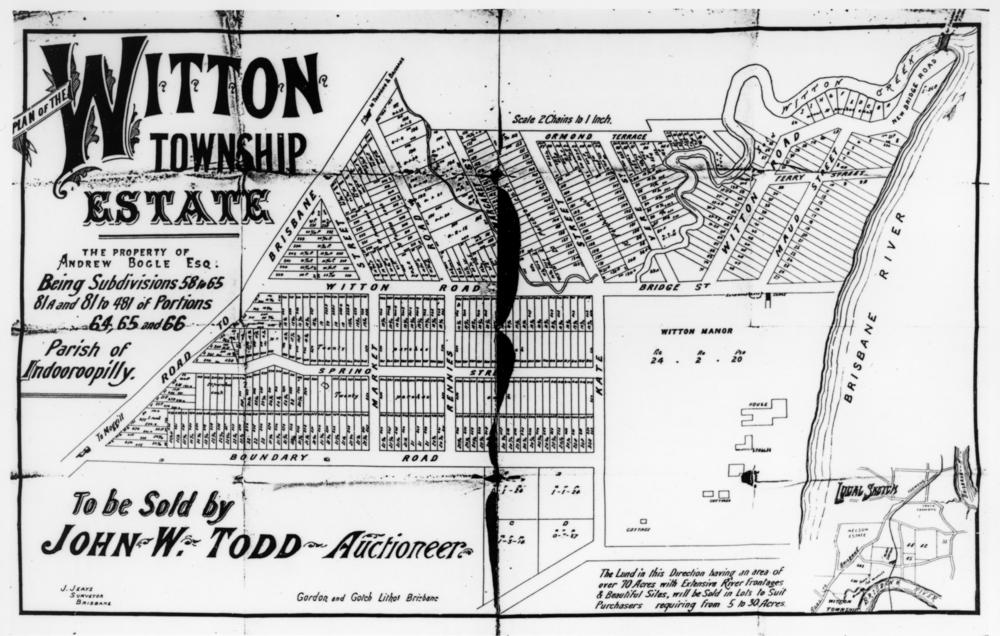
Witton Township real estate map, Indooroopilly, ca. 1880s

The arrival of rail in 1875 and completion of the Albert rail bridge across the Brisbane River to open the Ipswich rail line the following year spurred the urban development of Indooroopilly around the Indooroopilly railway station.

On 3 June 1878, auctioneer John Cameron offered 54 suburban allotments in the Henderson Estate which was bounded by Lambert Road to the north, Clarence Road to the west and the Brisbane River to the south. The lots were mostly 32 perches (810 m^{2}) except for the riverside lots which were larger. The sale was not completely successful as a further auction of the same estate was held on 6 December 1879 and again on 27 July 1880.

Indooroopilly State School opened on 7 July 1889 (this is the school still in Indooroopilly today).

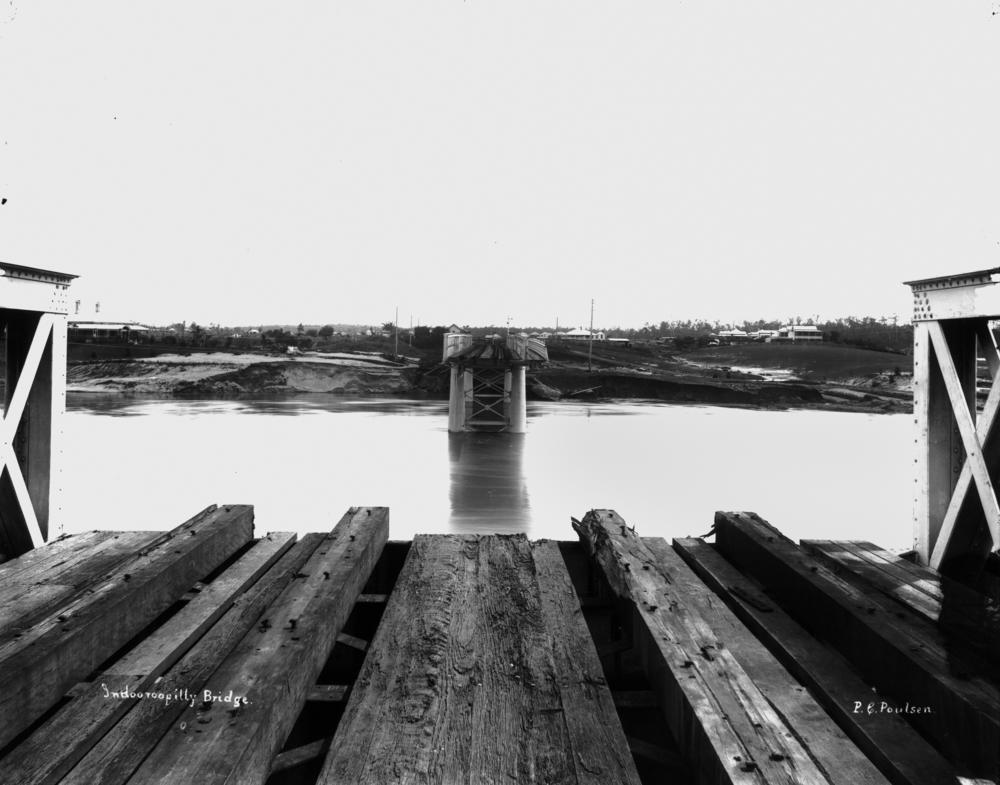
1st Railway Bridge, flood damaged, Indooroopilly, 1893

The 1893 Brisbane flood destroyed the original Albert Bridge, and its replacement was opened in 1895.

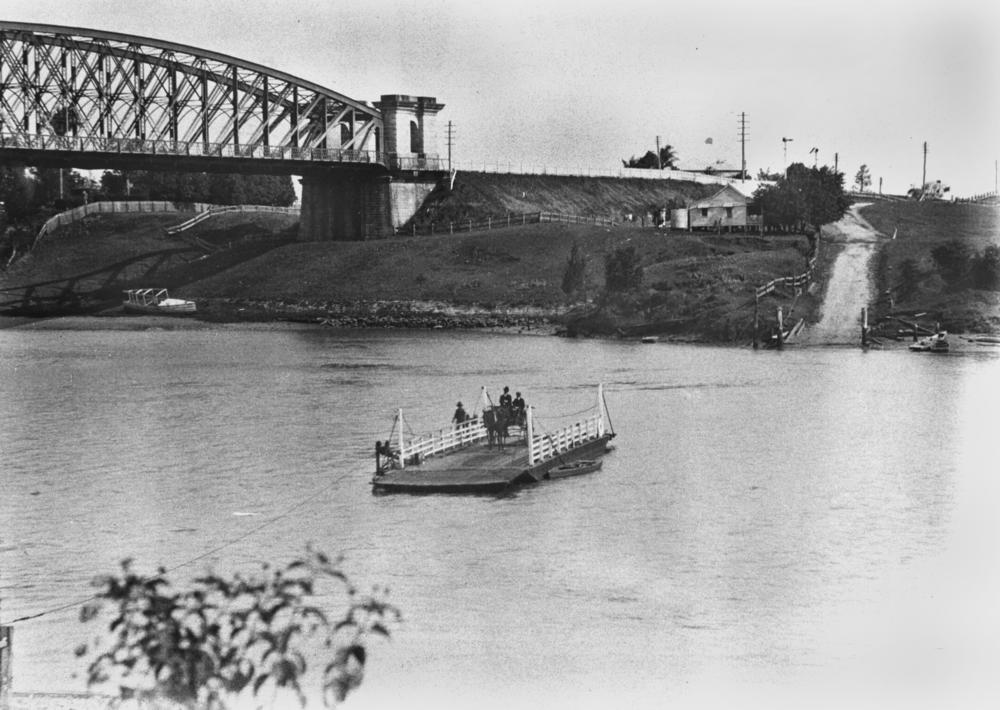
Ferry crossing, Indooroopilly, 1906

On 7 August 1909, auctioneer G.H. Blocksidge offered 60 suburban allotments, all 16 perches (400 m^{2}), in the Waverley Estate, which was bounded by Stanley Street to the west, Waverley Road to the north and Adelaide Street (now Woolley Street) and Nelson Street to the east. The Indooroopilly Silver Mine was established on Finney's Hill in 1919 and extraction continued until 1929 when the mine became unprofitable. In 1951 it was acquired by the University of Queensland as an experimental mine and teaching facility for engineering students (now part of the Julius Kruttschnitt Mineral Research Centre).

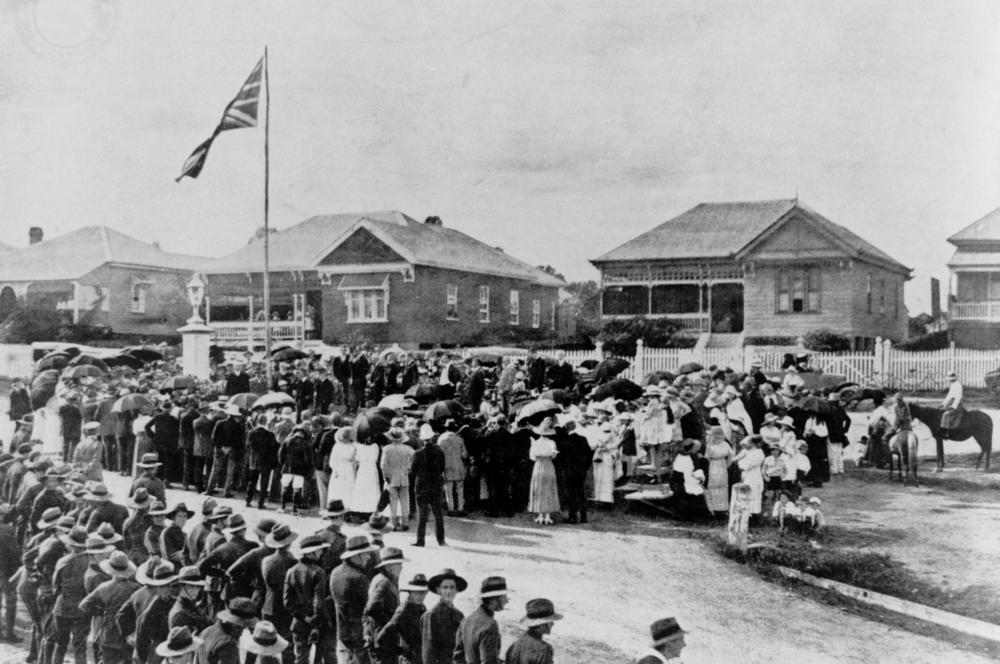
Unveiling of War Memorial, Indooroopilly, 1921

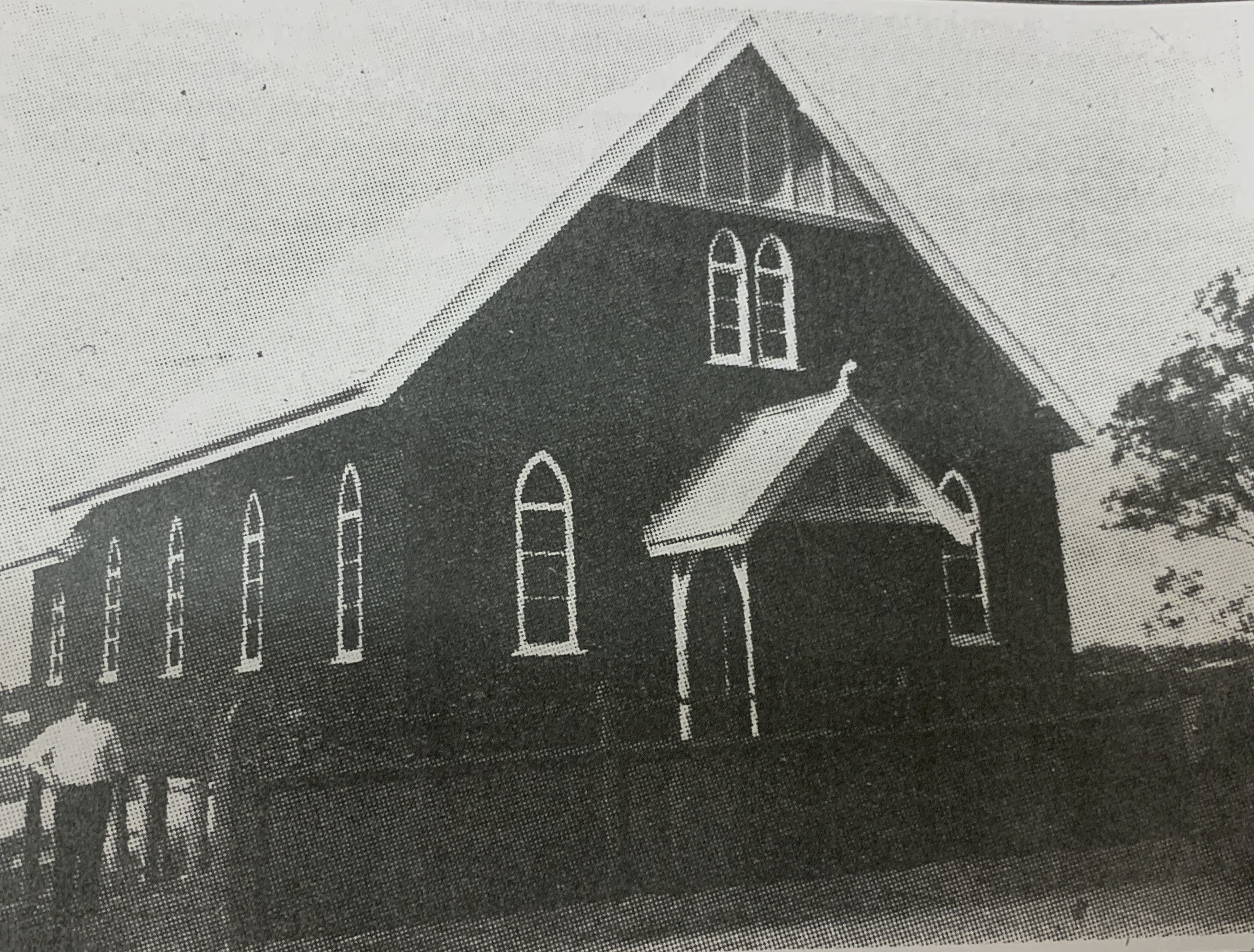
Presbyterian Church when new, December 1921

The Indooroopilly Presbyterian Church opened in 1922. The church was built by Mr W. McMullan, a retired fruit grower. The church was on the northern side of Station Road between Musgrave Road and the southern end of Stamford Street (27.5014°S 152.9726°E). It was approximately where the food court of Indooroopilly Shopping Centre is now located, the development of the centre having also removed the southern end of Stamford Street).

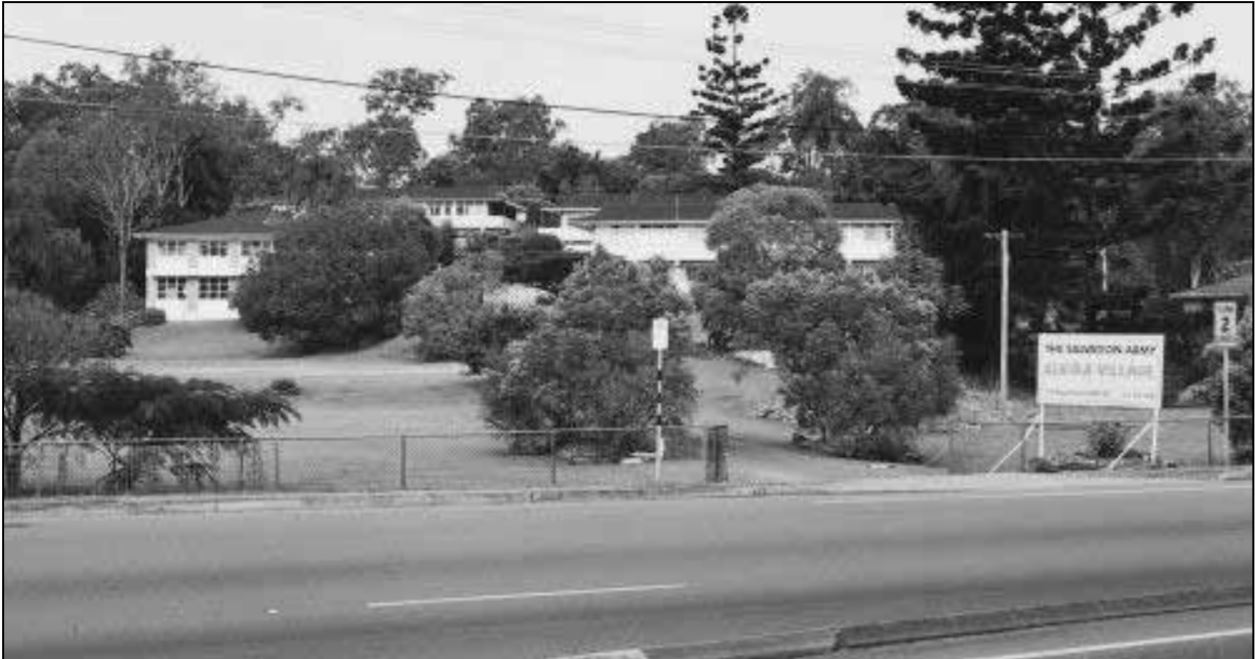
Alkira Boys' Home, operated by the Salvation Army

On 20 November 1922, the Queensland Governor Matthew Nathan officially opened the Industrial School for Boys on a site between Moggill Road and Jerrang Road in Indooroopilly (now 724 Moggill Road, Chapel Hill). It was operated by the Salvation Army for orphaned, abandoned and neglected boys. The 22-acre (8.9 ha) site had been purchased for £2300 and donated by philanthropist William Robert Black, who also paid £2700 to extend and renovate the buildings on site and for new furnishings. Black also provided for £100 per annum for maintenance. When it opened, there were 35 boys under the supervision of the first superintendent, Ensign Rogan. The school could provide accommodation for 50 boys supervised by nine staff. In 1942, due to fears of a Japanese invasion during World War II, the school evacuated to Washpool. In 1945 the school returned to the Indooroopilly site where it operated as a boys' home rather than as an industrial school. In 1968 was renamed Cooinda Salvation Army Home for Boys, but was renamed again in 1969 to be Alkira, Salvation Army Home for Boys. It closed in 1983 due to a loss of funding. As at 2021, the site is still owned by the Salvation Army, but has been reduced to 53,320 square metres (13.18 acres) and is used to operate The Cairns Aged Care Centre. The buildings of the former boys' home are no longer extant.

On Sunday 14 March 1926, Monsignor James Byrne laid the foundation stone of the Church of the Holy Family. On Sunday 4 July 1926 Monsignor Byrne opened and dedicated the new building to be used as both a church and a school. The church of the Holy Family is a wooden structure of 60 by 25 feet (18.3 by 7.6 m) with two 10 feet (3.0 m) verandahs. The architects were Messrs Hall and Prentice, and the contractor Mr R Robinson. The cost of the building was £2500 and the land something exceeding £4000. Against this a donation of £1000 had been received while at the foundation stone ceremony £500 was received and the donations at the opening were £400. However, it was not until late 1927 that five Brigidine Sisters relocated from Randwick in Sydney to Indooroopilly to occupy the house Warranoke (built in 1888-1889 for Gilson Foxton and designed by architects Oakden, Addison and Kemp). The Sisters opened Holy Family Primary School in the church-school building on 19 February 1928. The Sisters opened Brigidine College in Warranoke in 1929.

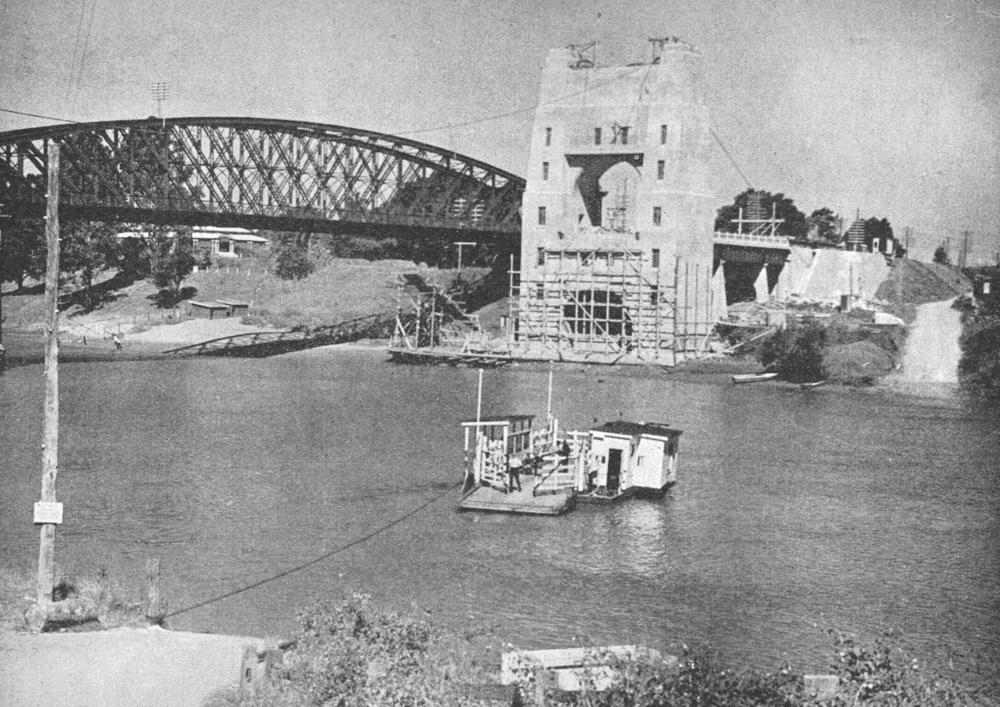
Ferry crossing and Walter Taylor Bridge under construction, Indooroopilly 1935

The Indooroopilly Toll Bridge (now the Walter Taylor Bridge) was opened on 14 February 1936 by the Governor of Queensland, Sir Leslie Wilson, at a cost of £85,000. The bridge was a toll bridge until 1966.

In 1936, Roman Catholic Archbishop James Duhig granted 25 acres (10 ha) of river front land on the Chelmer Reach of the Brisbane River to the Christian Brothers to establish a junior preparatory school for St Joseph's College at Nudgee to relieve the pressure on the boarding school at Nudgee. St Joseph's Nudgee Junior College opened and blessed by Duhig on 10 July 1938. The first principal was Brother J.M. Wynne. In the first year of operation there 46 boarders and 6-day pupils.

Indooroopilly was the location for Australia's principal interrogation centre during World War II. The three interrogation cells at Witton Barracks are the only cells remaining in the country.

St Peter's Lutheran College opened on 25 February 1945 in the 1897 villa Ross Roy. Its primary school St Peter's Lutheran Junior College opened on the same day but ceased to operate independently on 31 December 2001.

Indooroopilly State High School opened on 2 February 1954.

The first stage of Indooroopilly Shoppingtown opened in 1970.

The Indooroopilly Library opened in 1981 in Indooroopilly Shoppingtown and had a major refurbishment in 2011.

In 1995, the boarding school at St Joseph's Nudgee Junior College was closed and the boarders transferred to the main school at Nudgee. The school had approximately 300-day students in that year.

In 2014, St Joseph's Nudgee Junior College closed as the Queensland Government decision to move Year 7 from primary school to secondary school would have left the school struggling to survive with the smaller number of students, so the decision was taken to close the primary school feeding into the Nudgee secondary school and replace it with a new Catholic primary and secondary school. In 2015 a new Catholic school Ambrose Treacy College (named in honour of Ambrose Treacy) opened on the site, operating in the Edmund Rice tradition, with many students transferring from the old to the new school.

== Demographics ==
In the 2011 census, Indooroopilly had a population of 11,670 people; 50.9% female and 49.1% male. The median age of the Indooroopilly population was 29 years of age, 8 years below the Australian median. The most notable difference is the group in their twenties; in Indooroopilly this group makes up 28.5% of the population, compared to 13.8% nationally. Children aged under 15 years made up 13.9% of the population and people aged 65 years and over made up 10.2% of the population. 60% of people living in Indooroopilly were born in Australia, compared to the national average of 69.8%. The other top responses for country of birth were China 3.7%, England 3.2%, New Zealand 2.5%, India 2.1%, Malaysia 1.8%. 70.4% of people spoke only English at home; the next most popular languages were 6.3% Mandarin, 2.2% Cantonese, 1.7% Arabic, 1.2% Korean, 0.9% Spanish. The most common responses for religion in Indooroopilly were No Religion 29.7%, Catholic 20.6%, Anglican 13.1%, Uniting Church 5.1% and Buddhism 3.1%.

In the 2016 census, Indooroopilly had a population of 12,242 people.

In the 2021 census, Indooroopilly had a population of 13,622 people.

== Heritage listings ==
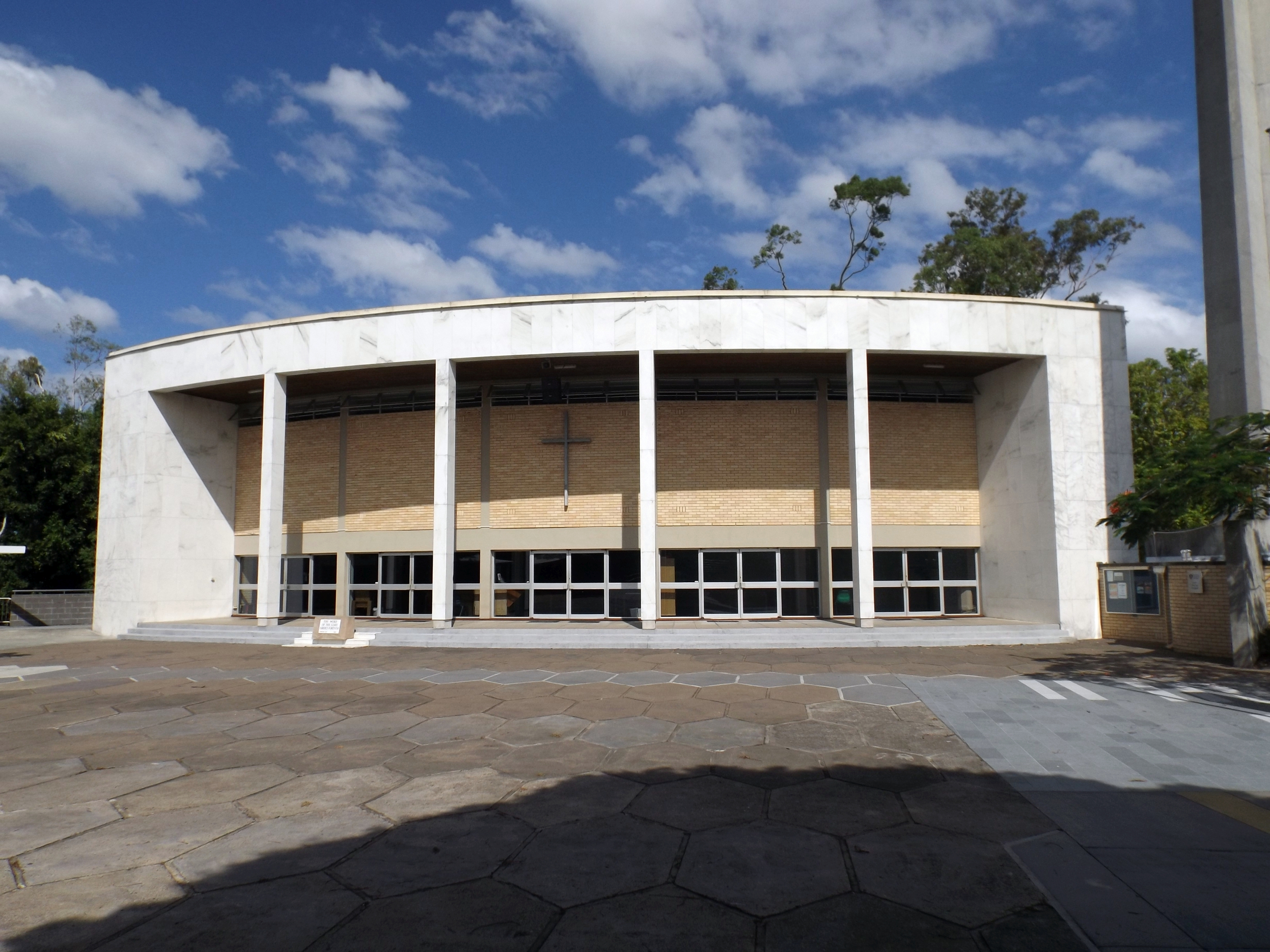
The Chapel of St Peter's Lutheran College, 2014

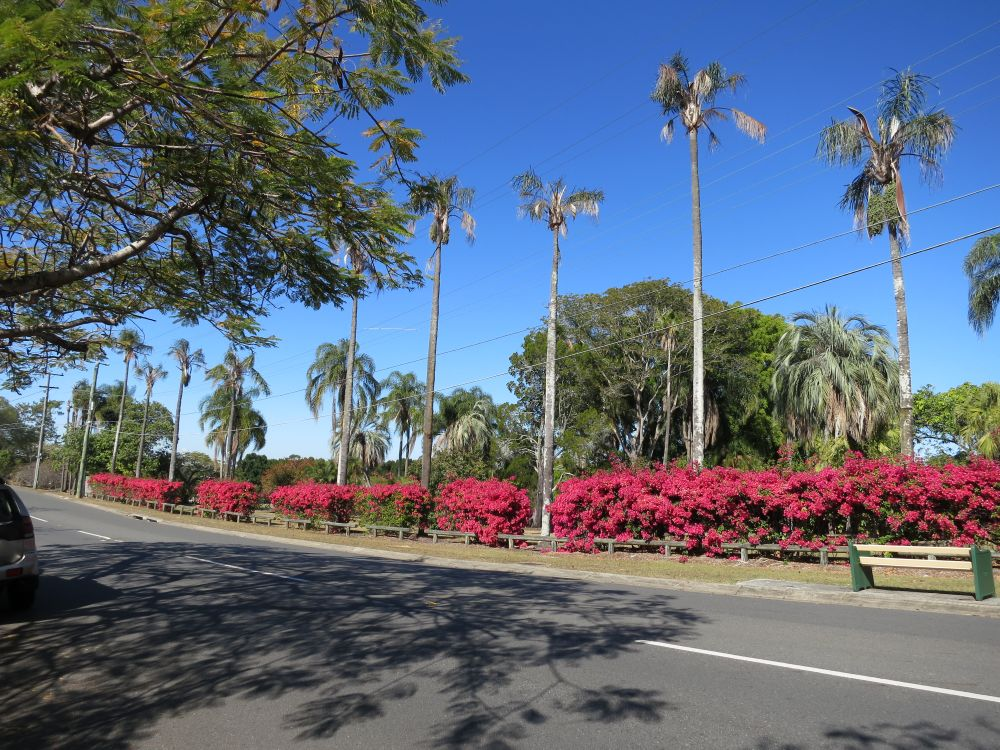
Thomas Park Bougainvillea Gardens, 2014

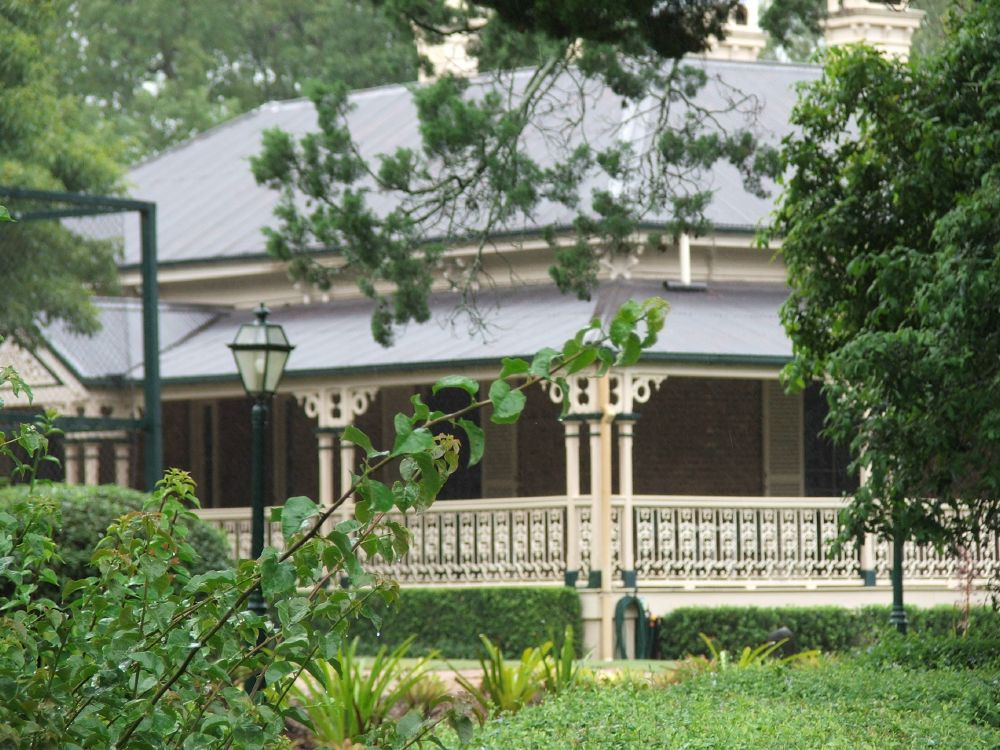
Greylands, Indooroopilly, 2009

Indooroopilly has a number of heritage-listed sites, including:

- Albert Bridge, Brisbane River between Indooroopilly and Chelmer
- Tighnabruaich (house), 203 Clarence Road
- Walter Taylor Bridge, Coonan Street
- Greylands (house), 47 Dennis Street
- Ross Roy, 60 Harts Road
- Chapel of St Peter's Lutheran College, 66 Harts Road
- Thomas Park Bougainvillea Gardens, 151 Harts Road
- Combined Services Detailed Interrogation Centre, 9 Lambert Road
- St Andrews Church Hall (former church), 72 Lambert Road
- Indooroopilly State High School buildings, Ward Street
- former Warranoke (now part of Brigidine College), 53 Ward Street:
- Keating residence, 10–12 Westminster Road

== Education ==
Indooroopilly State School is a government primary (Prep–6) school for boys and girls at the corner Moggill Road and Russell Terrace (27.5003°S 152.9654°E). In 2017, the school had an enrolment of 989 students with 66 teachers (60 full-time equivalent) and 34 non-teaching staff (20 full-time equivalent). It includes a special education program.

Holy Family Primary School is a Catholic primary (Prep–6) school for boys and girls at Ward Street (27.4999°S 152.9800°E). In 2017, the school had an enrolment of 250 students with 23 teachers (15 full-time equivalent) and 16 non-teaching staff (10 full-time equivalent).

Ambrose Treacy College is a Catholic primary and secondary (4–10) school for boys at Twigg Street (27.5075°S 152.9669°E). In 2017, the school had an enrolment of 851 students with 66 teachers (60 full-time equivalent) and 82 non-teaching staff (57 full-time equivalent).

St Peters Lutheran College is a private primary and secondary (Prep–12) school for boys and girls at 66 Harts Road (27.5059°S 152.9828°E). In 2017, the school had an enrolment of 1,992 students with 188 teachers (175 full-time equivalent) and 144 non-teaching staff (118 full-time equivalent).

Indooroopilly State High School is a government secondary (7–12) school for boys and girls at Ward Street (27.5005°S 152.9840°E). In 2017, the school had an enrolment of 1,834 students with 153 teachers (141 full-time equivalent) and 65 non-teaching staff (44 full-time equivalent). It includes a special education unit.

Brigidine College is a Catholic secondary (7–12) school for girls at 53 Ward Street (27.5005°S 152.9804°E). In 2017, the school had an enrolment of 807 students with 66 teachers (64 full-time equivalent) and 47 non-teaching staff (33 full-time equivalent).

The Japanese Language Supplementary School of Queensland Japanese School of Brisbane (ブリスベン校 Burisuben Kō), a weekend Japanese school, holds its classes at Indooroopilly State High School. The school offices are in Taringa.

== Amenities ==
There is a café and restaurant precinct along Station Road between the shopping centre and railway station as well as to the east of the railway station. There are two cinema complexes in Indooroopilly, the Eldorado cinemas on Coonan Street and Event Cinema Megaplex inside Indooroopilly Shopping Centre. This cinema complex once had 8 cinemas, now it boasts 16. It is the major cinema complex in the Western Suburbs. Indooroopilly youth organisations include the Indooroopilly Scout Group including Rovers and Indooroopilly Girl Guide District.

Indooroopilly is also home to one of Brisbane's oldest soccer clubs, Taringa Rovers.

The Indooroopilly Golf Club is a 36-hole championship course offering members and guests a variety of competition and social golf.

The Brisbane City Council operate a public library in the Indooroopilly Shopping Centre (Station Road end).

Indooroopilly Uniting Church is at 74 Station Road (27.5018°S 152.9719°E). It is part of the Bremer Brisbane Presbytery of the Uniting Church in Australia.

== Transport ==
Moggill Road is the main thoroughfare, connecting Indooroopilly to Toowong and the city via Coronation Drive (inbound), and Chapel Hill and Kenmore (outbound). The Western Freeway also serves the suburb. Indooroopilly is well connected by public transport. There is a bus interchange adjoining the Indooroopilly Shopping Centre, where Transport for Brisbane operates services to the CBD, university and other western suburbs. Indooroopilly railway station provides frequent services to the Brisbane CBD, Ipswich, Richlands and Caboolture.

== See also ==
- List of Brisbane suburbs
- Bridges over the Brisbane River
