= St Andrews Church Hall, Indooroopilly =

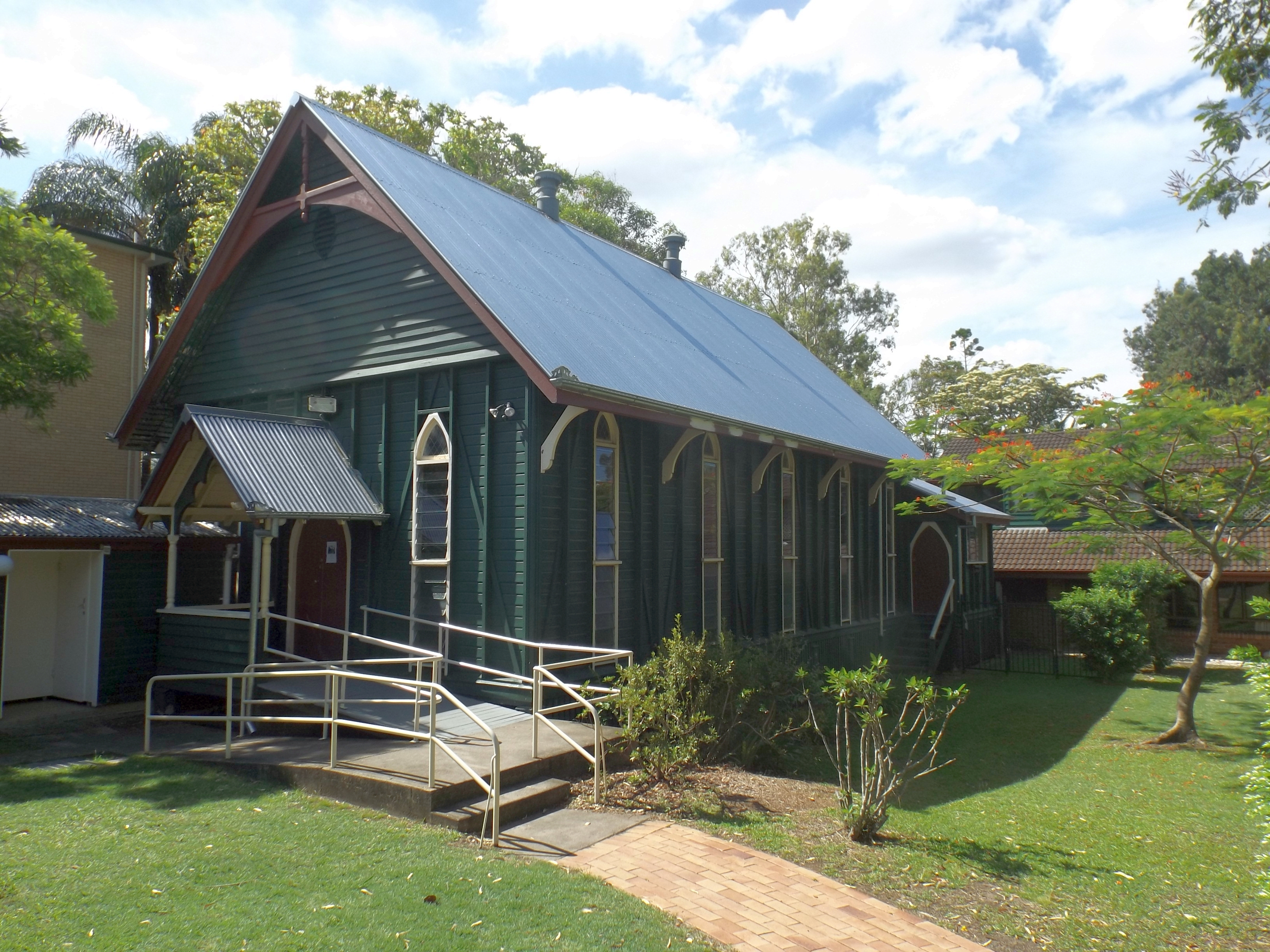
- Hall in 2014

- Location within Queensland Location within Australia
- 27.5032°S 152.9797°E
- Location: 72 Lambert Road, Indooroopilly, City of Brisbane, Queensland, Australia

History
- Design period: 1870s–1890s (late 19th century)
- Built: 1889–c. 1930

Site notes
- Architect: John Hingeston Buckeridge
- Architectural style: Gothic
- Website: anglicanipilly.org.au

Queensland Heritage Register
- Official name: St Andrews Church Hall, Indooroopilly Church of England Sunday School, St Andrews Church (temporary)
- Type: state heritage (built)
- Designated: 9 July 1993
- Reference no.: 600231
- Significant period: 1889, 1902, c. 1930 (fabric); 1889–1965 (historical)
- Significant components: stained glass window/s
- Builders: P Christensen

St Andrews Church Hall is a heritage-listed former church and now church hall at 72 Lambert Road, Indooroopilly, City of Brisbane, Queensland, Australia. It was designed by John Hingeston Buckeridge and built from 1889 to c. 1930 by P Christensen. It is also known as Indooroopilly Church of England Sunday School and the temporary St Andrews Church. It was added to the Queensland Heritage Register on 9 July 1993.

== History ==
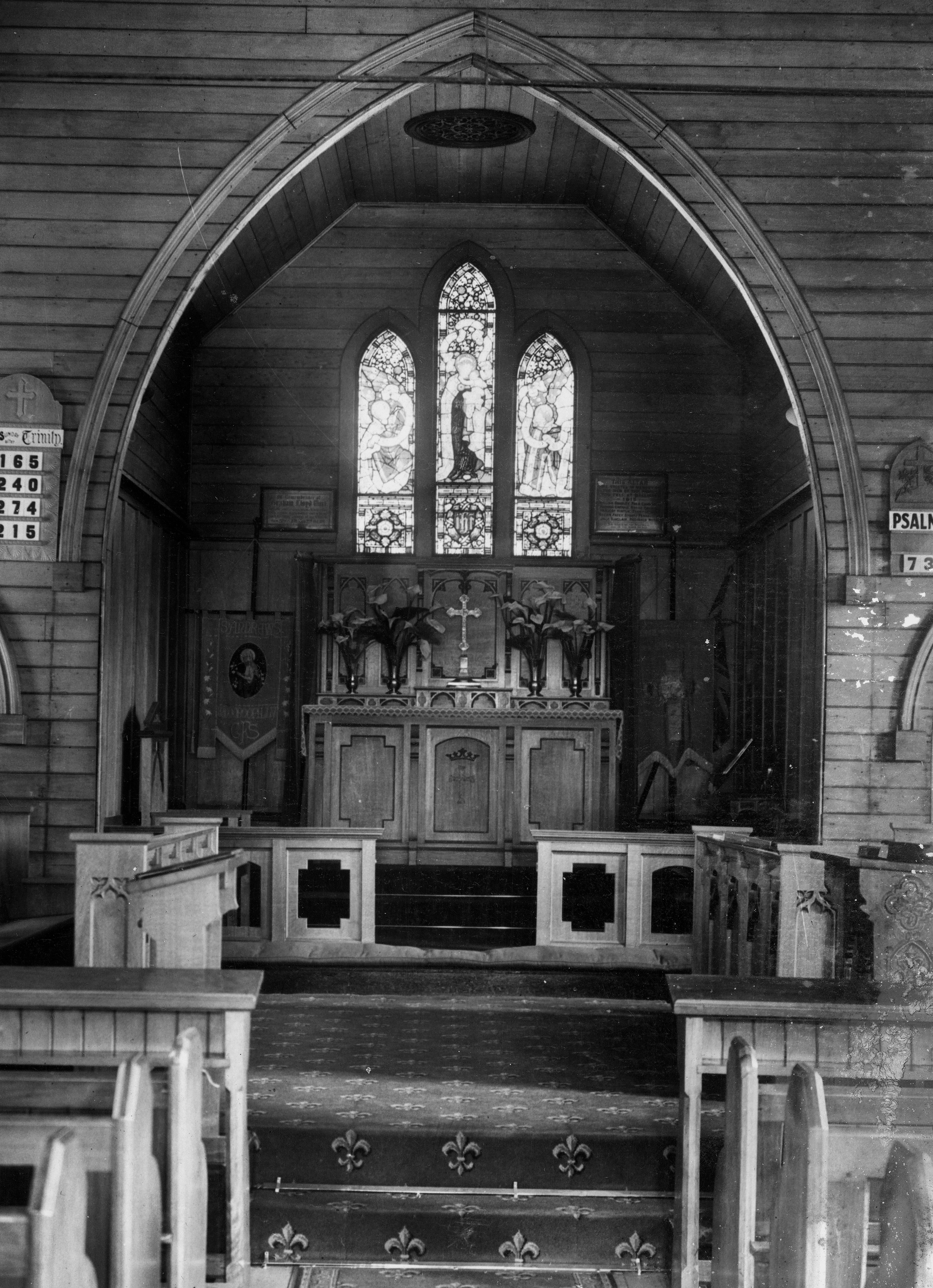
Interior of St Andrews Anglican Church at Indooroopilly, 1939

St Andrew's church hall was built in 1889 on half an acre of land, as the Indooroopilly Church of England Sunday School. Indooroopilly was originally included in the Parish of Toowong when it was formed in 1870. With the advent of the Main Line railway passing through Indooroopilly during the 1870s, an increasing number of people settled in Indooroopilly. Regular Church of England services were not held in the district until the 1880s. In 1888 the first meeting of those interested in the erection of an Anglican church in Indooroopilly was held and a committee formed to pursue this intention. The Parish of Indooroopilly separated from the Parish of Toowong in 1890.

Diocesan Architect, John Hingeston Buckeridge, was instructed to prepare a plan for a brick church to accommodate 500 people, and to give an estimate for a portion to seat 250 people. Buckeridge's plan was considered too large, and possibly too expensive, for the district, and he was asked to prepare another plan for a church to seat 250 people. The construction of the brick church was deferred, and it was decided that a Sunday School hall would be erected on the land, at a cost not to exceed £300. The Sunday school hall would be temporarily used as a church, then as a Sunday school when the permanent brick structure was erected.

The building was built by P Christensen, and cost £320. It was one of approximately ninety Anglican buildings erected during the episcopate of Bishop Webber, from 1885 to 1903. Webber had an understanding of ecclesiastical design and architecture generally and was responsible for bringing Buckeridge to Brisbane from London, as diocesan architect. Buckeridge was responsible for the design of over twenty timber churches in the Diocese of Brisbane.

The land for the church was donated by Graham Lloyd Hart (1839-1897), a prominent Brisbane solicitor and active member of the Church of England. It would appear that Hart's offer of the land was conditional upon a brick church being ultimately erected on the land. A number of memorials to former parishioners were added to the timber building which mainly included furnishings and ceremonial items. A set of three stained glass windows to the memory of Hart who died in 1897, were incorporated in the building in 1900. A new chancel was added in 1902. The sanctuary was built by JL Pratt with the design assistance of WH Mobsby of the Parochial Council. A choir vestry was added to the sanctuary c. 1930, designed by SC Rookwood.

In 1963 the timber building was moved about 150 metres (490 ft) to the north-west and re-oriented 90°, prior to the construction of the new brick church. Internal alterations were undertaken c. 1965, to convert the timber building into the parish hall. These included the removal of decorative elements particularly around the sanctuary and altar. The stained glass windows and other memorials were removed, and the majority placed in the brick church in 1965.

A timber toilet block has been constructed immediately adjacent to the entry porch of the hall. A new rectory was built at the rear of the hall in 1985.

== Description ==
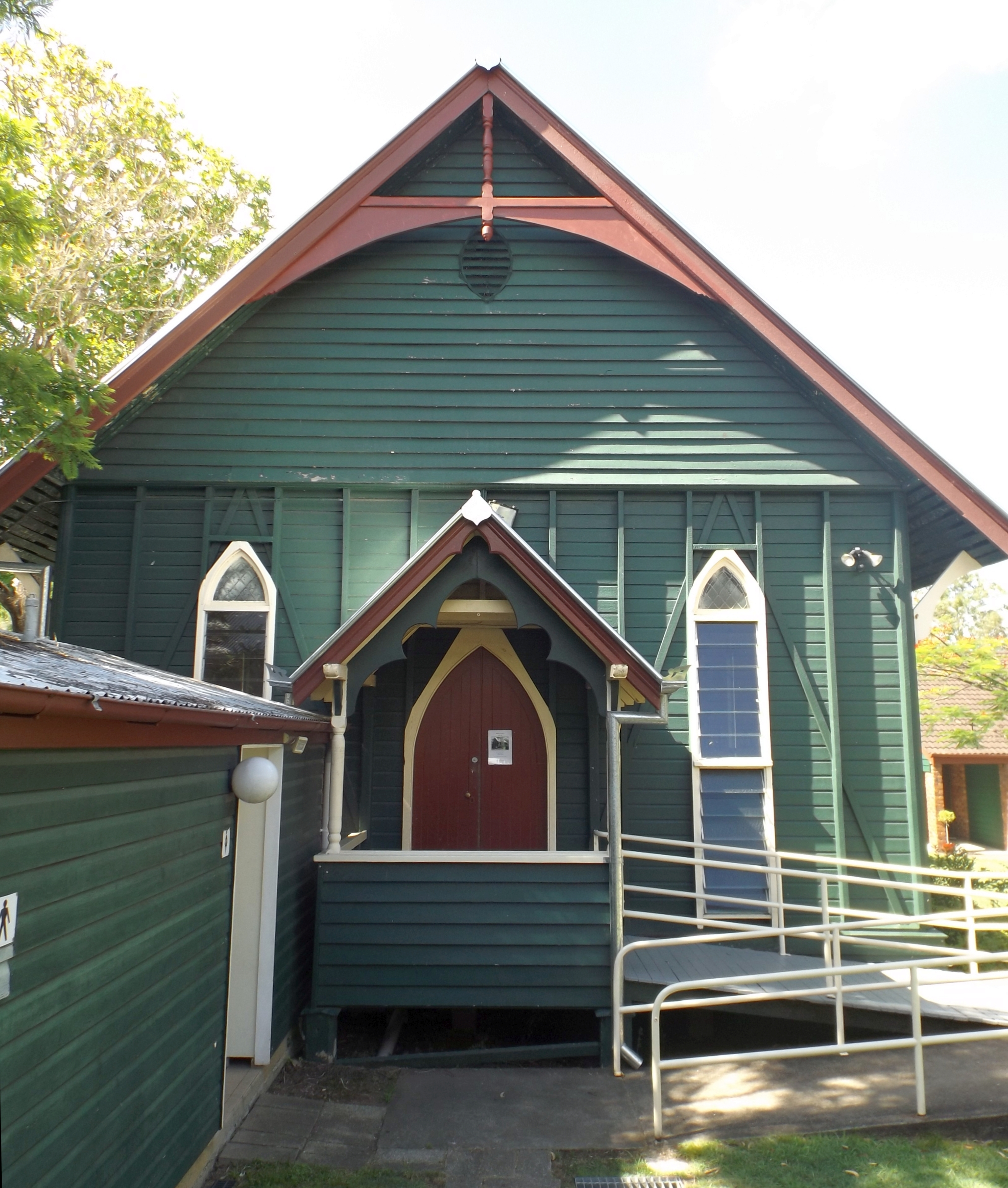
Entrance, 2014

St Andrews Hall is a single-storeyed Gothic influenced timber hall sited to the rear of a battle axe block, diagonally opposite the present St Andrews Church (1965). The hall has a steeply pitched corrugated iron roof, and exposed stud framing and cross-bracing over chamferboards. The southern end of the hall has a small decorative entrance portico with a pitched roof, while the extensions to the north (sanctuary c. 1902 and choir vestry c. 1930) have a lower roofline and project out to the east and the west. These extensions match the rest of the building in external detail.

Internal alterations (c. 1965) have included the removal of decorative detailing associated with the sacristy, sanctuary and vestry for refurbishment as a kitchen, servery and store area. The chancel arch appears to have been cut out and sheeted over. The floor has been lowered to the level of the former nave, stained glass windows replaced with louvred windows, and a timber ramp adjoining the entrance portico has been installed. External views of the building are partially obscured by a toilet block abutting the church to the south and a new brick rectory at right angles to the church to the north.

The hall is lit with tall rectangular windows which retain their stained glass toplights. Both the doors and windows have pointed arch timber-framed heads inside rectangular frames. The building is protected from water penetration by substantial roof overhangs with shaped eaves brackets, and broad timber weathercapping sloped at 45 degrees over a deep fascia around the base. The corners are protected and articulated with quarter-rounds between studs at right angles, and the gable ends are weatherboarded, the northern end having a leaf-shaped vent. The northern elevation bears the most noticeable marks of change, with the surrounds of now removed stained glass windows, a boarded-in pointed arch window frame, and a now disused door.

The entrance portico is finely detailed with carved round columns, a barge-board with a cinq-foil motif, and an exposed roof structure over a timber boarded ceiling.

Internally, the church retains its timber boarded floor and ceiling. The ceiling is raked, flattening out halfway, and has round carved timber ventilation panels. The scissor tie-rods to the roof structure are exposed.

The building is an externally intact example of exposed frame construction which has particularly well-considered weatherproofing detailing. It also retains with some fine external decorative elements, in particular the entrance portico, and the window and door framings.

== Heritage listing ==
St Andrews Church Hall was listed on the Queensland Heritage Register on 9 July 1993 having satisfied the following criteria.

The place is important in demonstrating the evolution or pattern of Queensland's history.

St Andrew's Church Hall is important in demonstrating the pattern of Queensland's history in particular the expansion of the Anglican Church in Brisbane in the late nineteenth century and the development of the Indooroopilly parish and the practice of erecting timber buildings as temporary structures until a masonry church could be erected as a permanent structure.

The place demonstrates rare, uncommon or endangered aspects of Queensland's cultural heritage.

St Andrew's Church Hall is significant as a rare example of a late 19th century exposed frame church and demonstrates the principal characteristics of a late nineteenth-century timber church by JH Buckeridge; and an exposed frame timber hall.

The place is important in demonstrating the principal characteristics of a particular class of cultural places.

St Andrew's Church Hall is significant as a rare example of a late 19th century exposed frame church and demonstrates the principal characteristics of a late nineteenth-century timber church by JH Buckeridge; and an exposed frame timber hall.

The place is important because of its aesthetic significance.

The building's fine external decorative elements, in particular the entrance portico and windows and door framing exhibit aesthetic characteristics valued by the community.

The place is important in demonstrating a high degree of creative or technical achievement at a particular period.

The use of timber technology is important in demonstrating a high degree of technical achievement.

- The place has a strong or special association with a particular community or cultural group for social, cultural or spiritual reasons.

As the temporary parish church then church hall for St Andrew's parish, it has special association with the Anglican community in Indooroopilly.

The place has a special association with the life or work of a particular person, group or organisation of importance in Queensland's history.

St Andrew's Church Hall has special association with the life of GL Hart and the work of JH Buckeridge, both of whom were associated with the Anglican Church.
