= History of electricity supply in Brisbane =

The electricity supply in Brisbane has been an important part of the economic and social development of the city of Brisbane, Queensland, Australia.

== 1882-1925 ==
In 1882, a demonstration of what electricity could do was conducted with eight arc lights along Queen Street in Brisbane, the capital and largest city in Queensland. Power was supplied by a 10 hp generator driven by a small engine in a foundry in Adelaide Street. This was Australia's first recorded use of electricity for public purposes.

The first practical use of electricity was for lighting in the Government Printing Office in George Street in April 1883. In 1886, the Roma Street Railway Yards were using arc lights, and in the same year, an underground cable connected the Parliament House from the Printing Office, the first of any Parliament House in Australia. The supervision of the laying of cable was done by E.C. Barton, who formed a company with C.F. White and in 1888 built a power house in Edison Lane behind the General Post Office with a generating capacity of 30 kW. The General Post Office became the first consumer of electricity in Australia and Barton and White the first electricity supplier in Australia. Adjoining shops were supplied by overhead wires, becoming the first non-government customers.

In 1896, Barton ceased his partnership with White and established the Brisbane Electric Supply Co., which in 1899 relocated from Edison Lane to Ann Street. In 1904 the company renamed itself the Central Electric Lighting Co. (CEL). Growing demand resulted in CEL building a new power station in William St in 1910 with a capacity of 1.2 MW, with the 0.5 MW plant relocated from Ann St in the same year and a further 0.7 MW capacity added the following year. In 1914 CEL converted to AC generation, DC being used until that time.

In the meantime the Brisbane Tramway Co. decided to electrify its network, and in 1897 it built Queensland's first significant power station at Countess Street, generating 0.9 MW @ 550 VDC, with capacity expanded to 4.05 MW by 1915 as the network was progressively electrified, as well as the construction of a second plant at Light Street with a capacity of 1.05 MW in 1913.

== 1925-1938 ==
In 1925, the greater Brisbane City Council (BCC) was created, from the old City of Brisbane, City of South Brisbane and various smaller Towns (Hamilton, Ithaca, Sandgate, Toowong, Windsor and Wynnum) and Shires (Balmoral, Belmont, Coorparoo, Enoggera, Kedron, Moggill, Sherwood, Stephens, Taringa, Tingalpa, Toombul and Yeerongpilly).

CEL held the 'franchise' for the former Brisbane and South Brisbane Council areas, and when the BCC decided to take over the generation and distribution of electricity, it offered to purchase CEL in 1926, the offer being rejected. Council had taken over the tramways network with three small powerhouses, none with enough capacity for expansion of the electricity network. To be able to expand, Council decided to construct a new powerhouse, and in 1928, the New Farm Powerhouse (now known as the Brisbane Powerhouse) became operational. The station had an initial capacity of 18.75 MW, expanding to 93.75 MW upon completion. The Countess St power station was decommissioned in the same year.

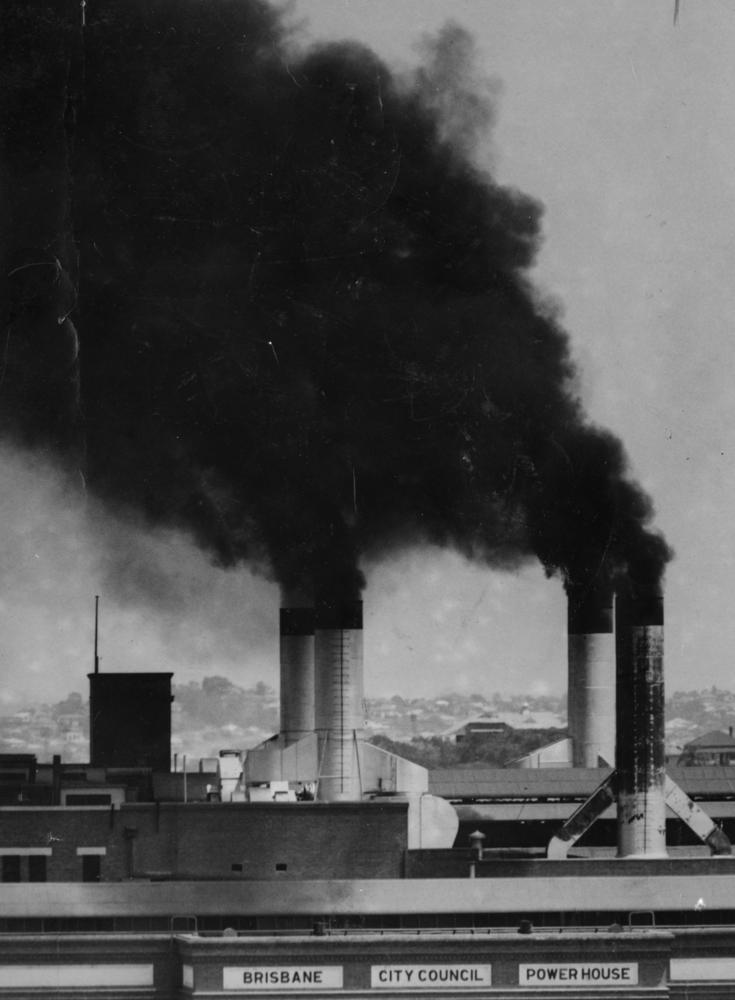
The New Farm Powerhouse in 1952 (now the Brisbane Powerhouse multi-arts venue)

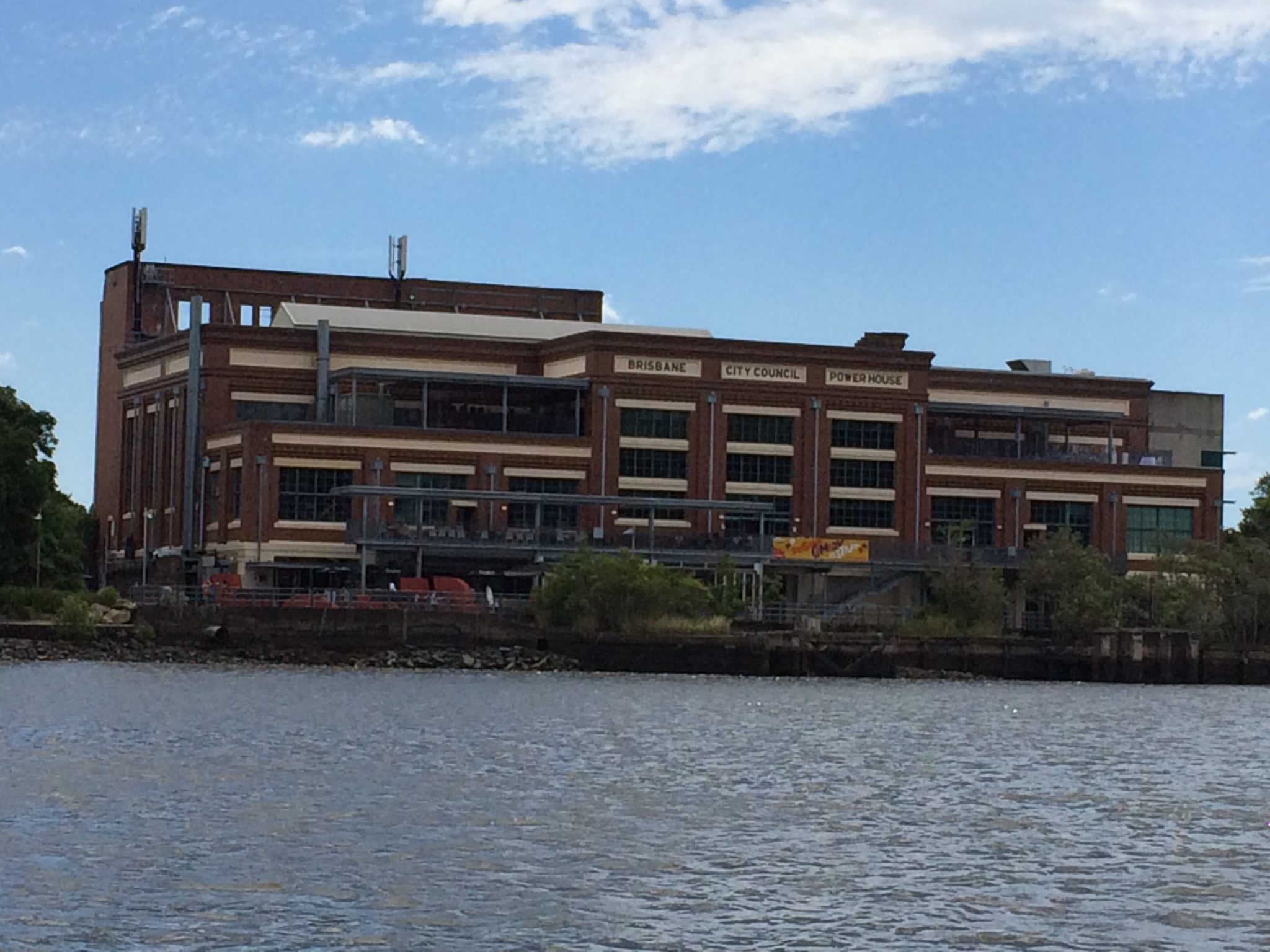
New Farm Powerhouse (As viewed from the Brisbane River)

CEL opened the Bulimba A power station in 1926 with an initial capacity of 12.5 MW, this being expanded to 92.5 MW by 1944. The William St power station was closed in 1931, and the plant sold to the Evans & Deakin engineering company. No longer able to expand its customer base in Brisbane, CEL commenced a program of rural electrification.

In addition to supplying the tramways network, the New Farm Powerhouse also allowed for the construction of an 11 kV network to supply power for electric light. Previously CEL had supplied these area under 10 year orders, but with Council having a new powerhouse, they slowly inherited the new areas of supply as each order expired. By 1935, only the old City of Brisbane and City of South Brisbane were still supplied by CEL, with the rest of Brisbane supplied by the BCC Electricity Supply Department.

Former Council Area	Year Electricity transferred to BCC
Ithaca	1926
Yerongpilly	1928
Hamilton	1930
Balmoral	1930
Coorparoo	1930
Stephens	1930
Sherwood	1931
Wynnum	1932
Taringa	1932
Windsor	1933
Toowong	1934
Toombul	1934
Enoggera	1935

=== Electricity Substations ===
Four initial 11 kV Substations were constructed in 1928 by Council at: Victoria Park (No.4), Lang Park (No. 6), Victoria Street, Woolloongabba (No. 9) and Cairns St, Kangaroo Point (No.11). By 1930 they had constructed four more 11 kV Substations: Balmoral (No. 12), Stephens (now Moorooka) (No. 13), Hamilton (No. 5), and Coorparoo (No. 10). These substations were supplied with 11 kV, and had to transform down to 5 kV, which was the voltage that CEL had constructed in these areas. The primary purpose initially was to supply residential areas with electric light, as electricity was an expensive commodity, and most houses did not use it for any other purposes.

These substations were constructed in accordance with the designs of long term City Architect Alfred Herbert Foster (A.H.Foster, 1873–23 March 1932). He joined the old City of Brisbane in 1913 as an Architectural Assistant to the City Engineer, and was made City Architect upon the formation of the greater Brisbane City Council. Harold Austen Erwood (H.A.Erwood, born c.1884–1947) was Foster's long term assistant and successor, working as an Architect with Foster at the old City of Brisbane, from 1914, then at the greater Brisbane City Council after 1925, until Foster's death in 1932. Erwood had to wait to be appointed City Architect however, and was still waiting in August 1932. BCC finally changed his designation from Chief Architectural Assistant to Chief Architect on 30 April 1933. Reyburn Jameson (c.1880–1950) was employed as an Assistant Architect from 1926–1929. South African born Jameson was previously employed as a draftsman by CEL from 1918 to 1920 and the City of Brisbane from 1921–1922. All three men appear to have been made Registered Architects from 14 June 1929, when the Architects Registration Act 1929 was enacted.

The substation buildings near or in residential areas were designed by Foster to fit in with residential areas, with similar designs employed by his successor Erwood.

Details of the brick building substations by Foster and Erwood are below.

Name	Original No	Post 1963 No	Details
Kedron	2	202	Designed by Erwood. No longer existing, replaced by a later operational 33 kV Substation.
Victoria Park	4	204	Designed by Foster. Existing, Local Heritage listed Substation (Decommissioned)
Hamilton	5	205	No longer existing, replaced by a later Local Heritage listed Substation.
Lang Park	6	206	Designed by Foster. No longer existing.
Victoria St, Woolloongabba	9	209	Designed by Foster? No longer existing.
Main Ave, Coorparoo	10	210	Designed by Jameson. Existing, State Heritage listed Substation (Decommissioned by 1977).
Cairns St, Kangaroo Point	11	211	Designed by Foster. Existing, Local Heritage listed Substation (Decommissioned by 1995).
Balmoral	12	212	Original building designed by Foster and later expanded by Erwood. Existing, and operational local Heritage listed Substation (minor network role only).
Moorooka	13	213	Original building (then called Stephens) designed by Foster. The site was expanded in 1942 to incorporate a 2nd building by Frank Gibson Costello. Existing, and operational local Heritage listed Substation.
Holland Park	30	230	Designed by Erwood. No longer existing, demolished and replaced by operational 33 kV substation.
Toowong	31	231	Designed by Erwood. No longer existing, demolished and replaced by operational 33 kV substation.
Nundah	37	237	Designed by Erwood. Existing, and operational local heritage listed substation, later upgraded to 33 kV.
Newmarket	38	238	Designed by Erwood. It was possibly his last substation as 39 & 40 were by Frank Costello. Existing, and operational local heritage listed substation, later upgraded to 33 kV.

Half of the interwar period brick substation buildings in the table above no longer exist, some have been replaced by newer substations that have been heritage listed. These substations were constructed to take supply from the New Farm Powerhouse, and when BCC constructed the new Tennyson Powerhouse, the 11 kV substations lost their importance, with the new Tennyson 33 kV network and Zone Substations taking over their role. BCC had been having voltage drop problems, and while initially they installed 11 kV feeder regulators with tap changers on the edge of the network, including Toowong substation, the new 33 kV network was able to resolve this problem.

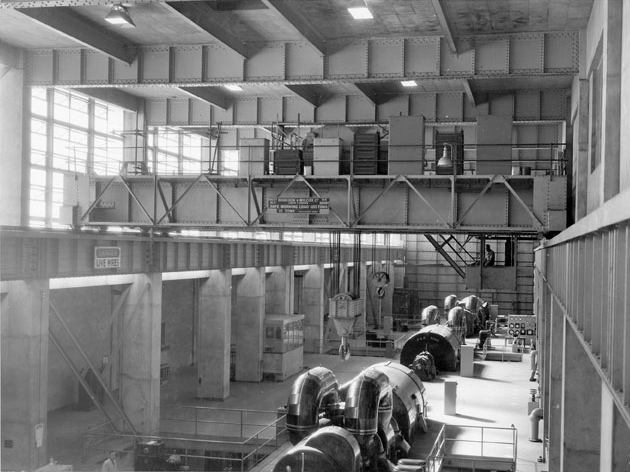
Turbines at the Tennyson Powerhouse, 1959

Erwood designed Kedron, Hamilton, Toowong and Holland Park Substations, which no longer exist. His remaining examples are the Nundah and Newmarket Substations, and while both the original brick buildings survive, both sites have been expanded and upgraded to 33 kV/11 kV Zone Substations. Kedron Substation site is still in use as a 33 kV zone substation, but Erwoods's original building, built c.1933 was designed to take underground 11 kV supply from the New Farm Powerhouse. Kedron Substation was also where the BCC's 33 kV transmission line to Somerset dam originated, which was constructed on-site about the same time as the substation. A photo of the site taken in 1950 shows the new enclosed 33 kV building and the old 11 kV building side by side. Similarly, there is a 1953 photo of the beautiful original Holland Park Substation.

The old Coorparoo Street Lighting Substation, located at Main Avenue, Coorparoo was constructed in May 1930 for the new 'Series' system street lighting. While there were already three 5 kV street lighting substation buildings, Coorparoo Substation (No. 10) was the first BCC 11 kV public lighting substation building, and by 1940, there were three such buildings. Coorparoo Substation was fed from the old Woolloongabba (No.9) Substation with 11 kV, which it then converted to 5 kV. The 'series' system was replaced by the 'parallel' system of street lighting by 1965, with the last of the 'series' system removed by 1977, with the Coorparoo Substation (No. 10) made redundant and decommissioned. The plans for the substation were signed by Reyburn Jameson (rather than Foster) which is perhaps why, unlike the other substation, it is made out of 200 mm concrete blocks, the only pre-World War Two Brisbane substation to be built of such materials. The site is still owned by Brisbane City Council, and has become far more visible from Old Cleveland Road, with the construction of the Eastern Busway in 2011, resulting in the demolition of homes between the substation and Old Cleveland Road, giving a much clearer views of the building from that road, as well as Main Avenue. The demolition of the Bowls Club for the Eastern Busway also resulted in the building becoming far more prominent with much more clear space around the site.

The interwar BCC 11 kV substation buildings have "a landmark quality due to its picturesque design, which was the result of a decision by the City Architect of the period, A.H. Foster, to limit the visual impact of Electrical Supply Department substations in residential areas by drawing on contemporary domestic architecture. The small industrial building reflects the prestige that the BCC associated with its electrification drive of the late 1920s and 1930s"

This style of substation was discontinued from 1940 with the dismissal of Erwood, when a new Council was elected, although the differing priorities brought by World War Two had already effectively meant that the Newmarket Substation built in 1938 was the last of its kind. The next City Architect, Frank Costello would bring a very different style of substation building design, seen to be far more in keeping with the wishes of the newly elected Brisbane City Council, headed by John Beals Chandler as Mayor and with his Citizens' Municipal Organisation aligned Councillors. On 16 July 1940, it was reported that 5 Executive Officers of the Council had been sacked, with Erwood one of them, after 26 years of service. Erwood was reported to have said: "In wartime anything is possible, but this came as a complete surprise to me".

== 1940 to 1953 ==
On 24 February 1941, a 38-year-old Sydney-based architect Frank G. Costello was appointed as the new City Architect. Costello had a completely different style of substation building, creating a much more utilitarian building, very different to his predecessors.

One of the substations he constructed was at Dudley Street, Annerley (Photo of Annerley Substation, taken 8 February 1952). Another was an upgrade of Moorooka (formerly called Stephens) Substation, with the photo taken in 1949 , Brisbane City Council

Costello, later became the overall Town Planning and Building Department Manager, when the Town Planner, R.A. McInnes left Council. With the end of the Chandler administration in 1952, Costello himself was fired along with seven other executive officers (including his deputy), C.A. Hamilton on 7 July 1952. Costello went on to work for a private firm immediately after his dismissal. Controversy was caused, when an engineer was called in to act in the role of City Architect, after Costello's successor in the Town Planning and Building Department Manager role, Mr. L.U.C. Kempster departed in 1954 (as the former Town Clerk of the old Sandgate Town Council, Kempster was the last of the former town clerks to still be work at Brisbane City Council). The purge of the section saw most of the staff working on the then proposed town plan sacked, including many of the remaining qualified architects with the last remaining senior architect departing in 1953.

== See also ==
- Energy in Queensland
- History of electricity supply in Queensland
- Brisbane Powerhouse
- Coorparoo Substation No. 210
