= Keating residence, Indooroopilly =

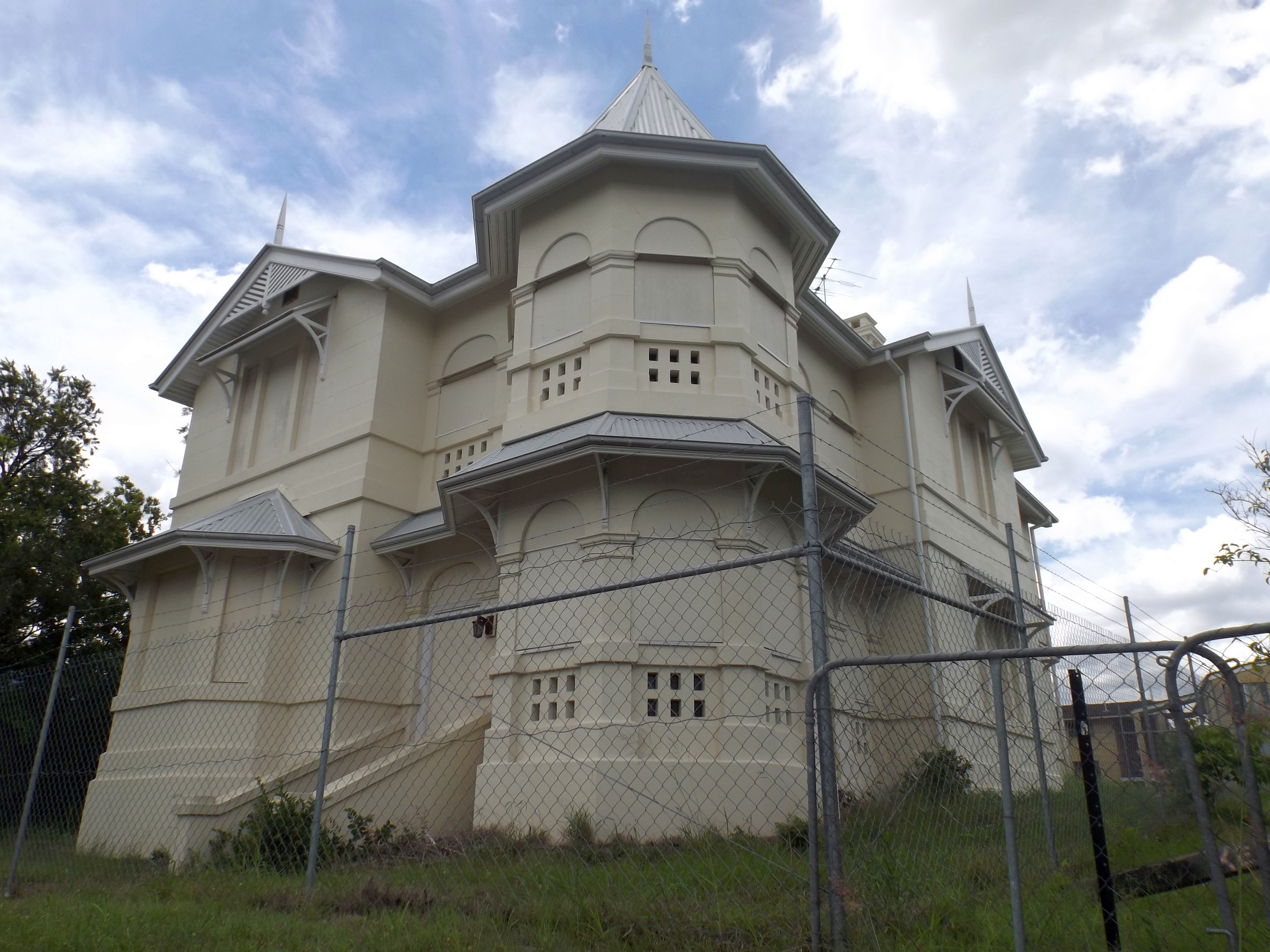
- Fence surrounding the house in 2014

- Location within Queensland Location within Australia
- 27.5018°S 152.9755°E
- Location: 10–12 Westminster Road, Indooroopilly, City of Brisbane, Queensland, Australia

History
- Design period: 1870s–1890s (late 19th century)
- Built: c. 1890s

Site notes
- Architect: Richard Gailey

Queensland Heritage Register
- Official name: Keating Residence, Indooroopilly, Louis Stamm residence, Keating House, Residence, 8 Westminster Street (1890s)
- Type: state heritage (built)
- Designated: 28 May 1999
- Reference no.: 602057
- Significant period: 1890s, 1920s/1930s (fabric); 1890s–1930s
- Significant components: steps/stairway, furniture/fittings, lead light/s, tower – observation/lookout, views to, views from, residential accommodation – main house, wall/s – retaining

Keating House is a heritage-listed villa at 10–12 Westminster Road, Indooroopilly, City of Brisbane, Queensland, Australia. It was designed by Richard Gailey and built c. 1890s. It is also known as Louis Stamm residence. It was added to the Queensland Heritage Register on 28 May 1999.

== History ==
This residence on Westminster Road, Indooroopilly, was constructed in about the 1890s as the home of Louis Stamm, a Brisbane-based business man. The building is thought to have been designed by prominent local architect, Richard Gailey. The building was last occupied as a residence in c. 1999.

During the 1880s and 1890s Indooroopilly developed as a fashionable suburb with the construction of a number of substantial residences. Louis Stamm, who later built the residence on Westminster Road, purchased a 42-acre block at Indooroopilly on 21 April 1873 only two years before the opening of the Indooroopilly railway station. The coming of the railway provided the major impetus to the development of the suburb. By the late 1880s government and social facilities, including a school, an hotel, shops and a carpenter were established in Indooroopilly.

Louis Stamm is variously described in sources as a merchant, newspaper proprietor and brewery owner in Queensland. He is listed in the Queensland Post Office Directories simply as a Justice of the Peace. Stamm subdivided the Indooroopilly property which included land adjacent to the railway station in 1875, the year that train services were established, and land was sold from this original allotment during the next twenty years encouraging further growth of the suburb. Major suburban residences including Ross Roy, Claude William Chambers' own house dating from 1897; Henry Hunter's own house designed by him on Clarence Road in 1888; William Archdall's house on Station Road by Hunter and Corrie of 1891; Warwillah (Glencairn) for FC Bolton designed by Charles McLay in 1892; Riverton for James Cannan and Tighnabruaich for Henry Charles Stanley both designed by Francis Drummond Greville Stanley in the late 1880s; Newlands for Newman Wilson designed by Alexander Brown Wilson in 1889 and a number of houses designed by Oakden, Addison and Kemp including Warranoke for Gilson Foxton, Robert Rendle's house and George Henry Male Addison's own house, Fernbrook, all dating from the late 1880s-early 1890s.

This residence, which Louis Stamm constructed for his own use in the 1890s belongs to the tradition of these other houses. Louis Stamm is thought to have commissioned local architect, Richard Gailey to design the building. Gailey was commissioned for the design of a number of substantial residences in the late nineteenth century, including Moorlands, Glen Olive (his own house) and Verney. A description of early large homes in Indooroopilly appeared in the Brisbane Courier of 15 August 1931 which after listing a number of the houses mentioned above describes the house of Louis Stamm:

"...while the home of Mr LJ Keating, on Westminster-road was constructed to the design of the late Mr Richard Gailey and is considered to be one of the outstanding examples of residential architecture in Brisbane. It was built by Mr Keating's grandfather, the late Mr L. Stamm about 35 years ago and used to be occupied by the late Dr Hawkes, Mr HR Boer (at one time Attorney General), Mr T Daley, solicitor and other prominent citizens."

It seems that Louis Stamm may never have lived in this house, as his residence is listed most often as at 25 Herbert Street, Spring Hill. Stamm was an early Chairman of the Indooroopilly Divisional Board when it separated from Taringa Division and Toowong Division. By 1885 Stamm retained only 10 acres (4.0 ha) of his original Indooroopilly allotment and this was mortgaged to Henry Love who subdivided it in the late 1880s. Stamm retained lots 71, 72 and 73 of Portion 46 and this transfer from Love was recorded in 1898. Stamm is thought to have built the house at about this time. The residence appears to have been leased to a number of people during the years from its construction to the 1920s when the Keating family moved there.

Stamm died in 1903 and the house and land were passed to his daughter Mary Louisa Keating, who had married Andrew Keating in 1884. Mary Louisa and Andrew had two children, Louis Joseph and Margaret Francis. Louis Keating and his wife, Eileen Matilda, moved into the residence on Westminster Road in 1924. Eileen Matilda died and Louis remarried, Eileen Phillis. Following the death of Louis Keating, Eileen Phillis Keating remained at the residence until early 1999.

During the 1920s or 1930s the house seems to have been extensively renovated. Much of the interior fittings and finishing of the present building, particularly on the ground floor, along with some external detailing, appear to date from this period rather than from the late 1900s from which the shell of the house dates.

The property was unoccupied after 1999 and was sold by the Public Trustee in 2002 to Amalek Pty Ltd. In 2008 Amalek were served with a maintenance notice to repair doors and windows, clear the drains and fence and mow the yard. As the building had not been well-secured, vandals had broken in resulting in damage and theft, allowing for subsequent rain damage. It was the first application of changes made by the Queensland Government to the Queensland Heritage Act 1992 to allow the government to force owners to maintain their heritage properties or pay a fine up to $75,000.

== Description ==
The Keating Residence, Indooroopilly, is a substantial rendered brick two-storeyed house, prominently sited on a principal thoroughfare from Indooroopilly Railway Station to the Indooroopilly Shopping Centre. The building is apparent from many surrounding streets and is distinguished from other development in the area by its age and unusual architectural treatment.

The residence is a two-storeyed building, with unusual external features such as a pyramidal roofed tower on the principal elevation and extending its octagonal plan form down through the corner of the building. The building is essentially rectangular in plan with one of the short faces of the plan from facing Westminster Road being the principal facade of the building. The octagonal tower element projects from the south eastern corner of the plan.

The building has a complex roof structure, dominated by the tower element which is higher that the other roof elements. The entire roof and the awnings which line the faces of the building are clad with corrugated iron sheeting. A number of gabled projections extend from the face of the building. The gable ends are treated with diagonally battened panels incorporated into which are fine finials and drop mouldings. Variously sized gabled projections occur on each of the four faces of the building, from various points. This asymmetrical massing contributes to the overall picturesqueness of the structure.

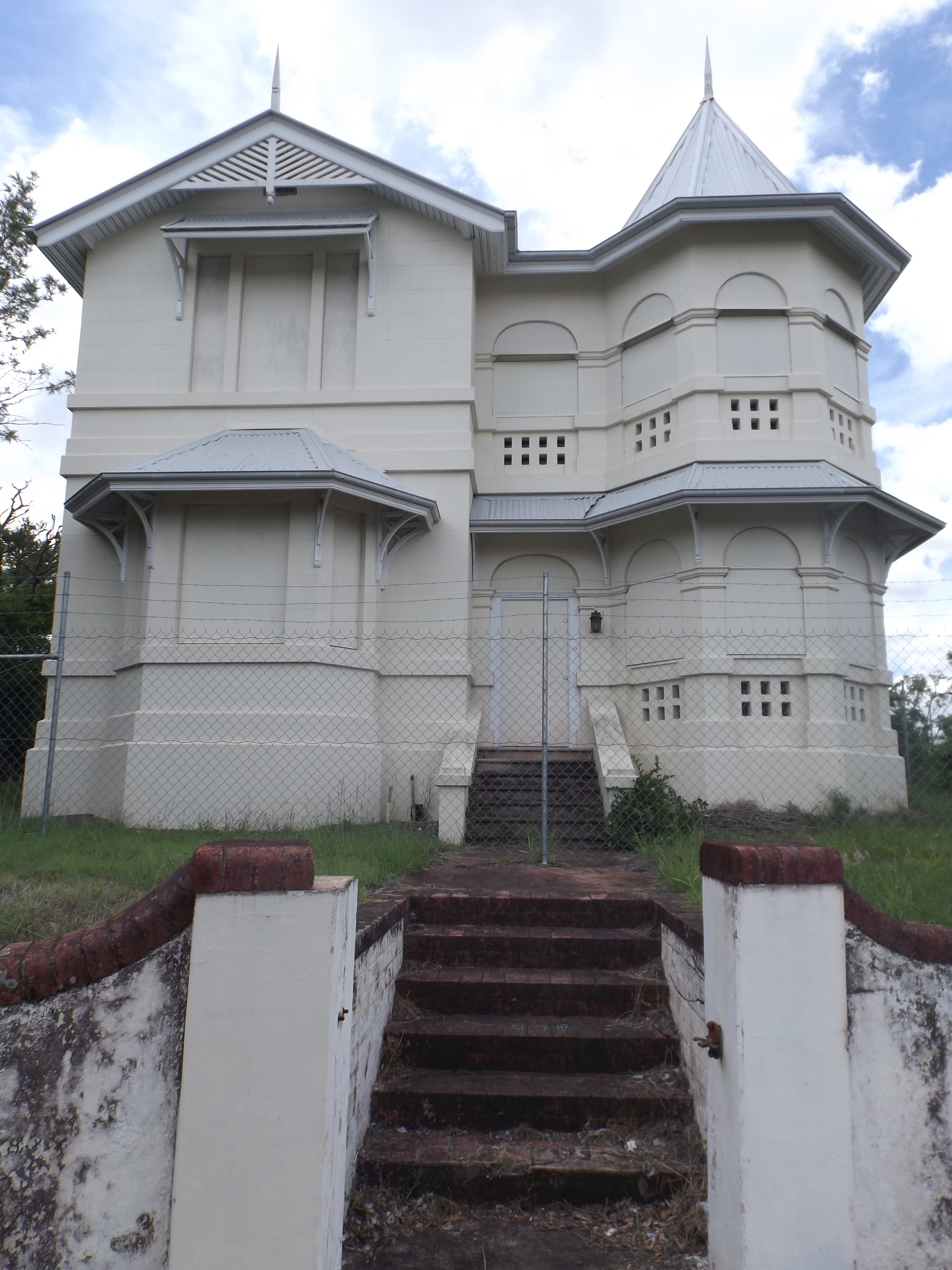
Stairs leading to the house, 2014

Access is provided to the building from a two part stair extending from the Westminster Road footpath to the entrance door. The Westminster Road boundary of the property is bordered by a large rendered masonry fence which acts as a retaining wall, braced by a number of piers. The fence is capped with a row of face bricks. Centrally positioned in this fence is a wrought iron gate providing access to a series of concrete stair rendered with a red colouring. These stair reach a concrete landing level with the surrounding landform and from here a second series of concrete steps lead to the front door. This second series are flanked by a short rendered masonry wall with face brick capping.

The southern elevation which is the principal facade, has a central entrance bay, with the tower element to the east and a gabled projection to the west. The central entrance, to which access is provided via the already mentioned stairs, is a single timber framed and glazed door with an elliptical fanlight above. The glazing in these features and in most other openings throughout the building is arctic glass. The tower element is lined on both storeys with round arched window openings fitted with casements and a round arched transom above. Below the windows, which are separated by simple moulded pier-like elements is a concrete panel with six rectangular perforations, filled with glass bricks on the inside face. The ground floor of tower windows are shaded by an awning supported on oversized brackets and extending from the front door around to the eastern facade of the building. The gabled projection on the southern face of the building features a ground floor bay window which has a steeply pitched hipped awning supported in similarly oversized brackets. The upper floor of the gabled element features a central three part window opening, again shaded by an awning.

The entire building is lined with a series of concrete rendered mouldings, at base level forming a plinth; at the level of the sill of the ground floor windows; at the level of the base of the round arched windows above the ground floor windows; at the line of the first floor; at the line of the sills of the first floor windows and, again, at the top of these windows, below the arched transoms. This banding is variously smooth rendered and moulded. The western, eastern and northern faces of the building, continue the banded mouldings, fenestration patterns and gable detailing.

Internally, the two floors of the building are arranged around a central hall which continues northward from the position of the front door to the rear of the building. On the ground floor the front door provide access to a large porch area which incorporates the area of the tower element. The large proportion of window openings in the walls ensure that this porch area and a similar area on the first floor are naturally lit and ventilated. The flooring in the porch is of terrazzo tiles which have been formed into patterns reflecting the unusual planform of the spaces. French doors open onto the porches from internal rooms.

A large nineteenth-century doorway opens from the ground floor porch to the hallway of the house. It is thought that this was the original entrance to the building when the porches were only semi-enclosed prior to the renovations of 1920s. This doorway comprises a single timber panelled and moulded door flanked by sidelights and a transom panel above. The sidelights and transom feature leadlight panels. This door leads onto the hall, in the vicinity of the timber dog-leg stair. The stair features turned newel and balusters and is clad with stained timber boarding on the underside.

The hall of the ground floor, like most of the rooms on this floor is lined with timber panelling to a height of about 2.5 metres (8 ft 2 in). The hall features a number of plaster rendered archways supported on piers. The ceiling of the hall is plastered and without cornices.

The first room on the west of the hall from the doorway is a study, which has a large bay window into which is fitted a window seat. The three windows within the bay are fitted with leadlight panels. The walls of the study are lined with timber panelling surmounted by a plate rail supported on timber brackets aligned with the framing of the wall panelling. The ceiling of this room is lined with pressed metal, with a central panel, borders and cornices. Like this room the drawing room on the ground floor is lined with timber panelling with a plate rail and has elaborate pressed metal ceilings. A white marble fireplace and a large three part window opening with leadlight panels are features of this room. The dining room on the ground floor, which is in the north eastern corner of the building, is the only room on the ground floor which survives with a nineteenth century interior. The room has plaster walls, a plaster moulded cornice, a white marble fireplace with cast iron grate and surrounds and a tiled hearth.

The rooms on the upper floor have been more recently renovated, with c. 1950s wall veneer panelling on all walls and plaster walls and ceilings. The windows are framed in original moulded timber framing. The ceiling of the first floor hall has been recently repaired with plasterboard.

== Heritage listing ==
Keating Residence, Indooroopilly was listed on the Queensland Heritage Register on 28 May 1999 having satisfied the following criteria.

The place is important in demonstrating the evolution or pattern of Queensland's history.

The residence at 10–12 Westminster Road was constructed in the late 1890s and demonstrates the development of Indooroopilly at this time when a number of substantial, architect designed residences were built on large allotments.

The place is important because of its aesthetic significance.

The building is an outstanding example of late nineteenth century architecture in its picturesque massing, unusual detailing and garden setting. The interiors of the house are of particular significance, with intact fittings and fixtures dating from the 1920s. In particular the timber wall panelling, pressed metal ceilings, carpeting, fixed furnishing and other fittings on the ground floor of the residence are of particular interest.

The place has a strong or special association with a particular community or cultural group for social, cultural or spiritual reasons.

The residence has aesthetic and social value as a local landmark. The building is prominently sited on a principal thoroughfare and is distinguished by its unusual architectural treatment and age from the surrounding development.
