= Indooroopilly (disambiguation) =

Indooroopilly may refer to:

- Indooroopilly, Queensland, a suburb of Brisbane, Australia
  - Indooroopilly bus station
  - Indooroopilly Division, a former local government area
  - Indooroopilly Island Conservation Park
  - Indooroopilly Railway Bridge
  - Indooroopilly railway station
  - Indooroopilly Reach, a reach of the Brisbane River
  - Indooroopilly Shopping Centre (formerly Westfield Indooroopilly a.k.a. Indooroopilly Shoppingtown)
  - Indooroopilly State High School
  - Electoral district of Indooroopilly, an electoral district of the Queensland Legislative Assembly
  - Shire of Indooroopilly, a former local government area
