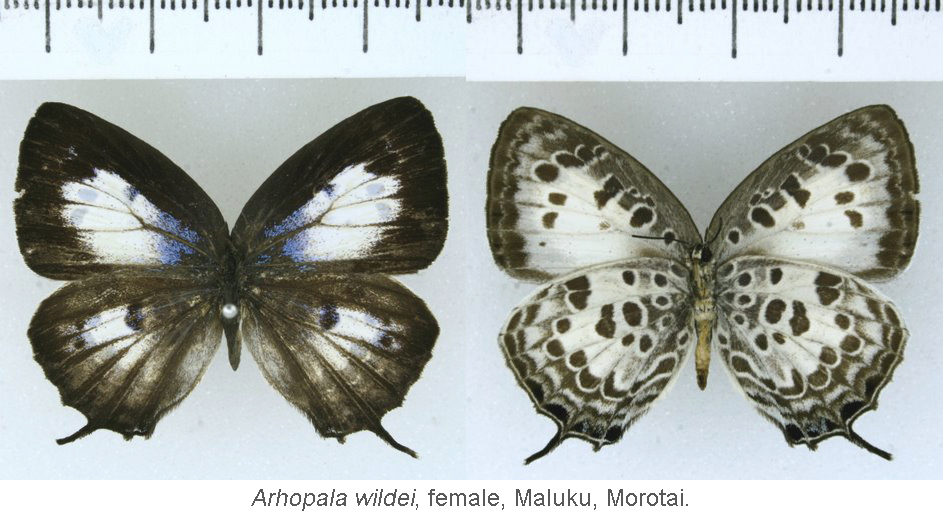

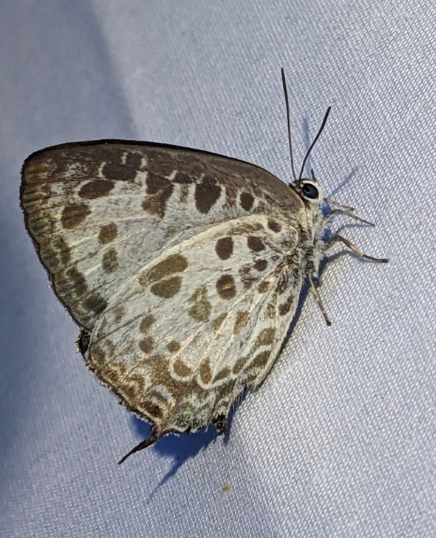

Scientific classification
- Kingdom: Animalia
- Phylum: Arthropoda
- Clade: Pancrustacea
- Class: Insecta
- Order: Lepidoptera
- Family: Lycaenidae
- Genus: Arhopala
- Species: A. wildei

Binomial name
- Arhopala wildei Miskin, 1891

Synonyms
- Narathura wildei; Amblypodia cupido Bethune-Baker, 1903 (unavailable)

= Arhopala wildei =

Species of butterfly

Arhopala wildei, the small oakblue or white oakblue, is a butterfly of the family Lycaenidae. It is found in Irian Jaya, western New Guinea, and from Cape York to Innisfail in northern Queensland, Australia.

Their wingspan is about 30 mm. Seitz- wildei Misk. (147 h), from Queensland, is quite similar [ to Arhopala disparilis ], but the margin of the female hindwing above is much broader, and the white under surface in the disc covered with numerous spots.- A form or species quite similar to it flies, according to Waterhouse and Lyell in the Aru Is. The insects mostly fly very high, so that they are difficult to capture and therefore rare in collections.

Their larvae feed on ant eggs, and probably also the larvae. They live in the arboreal nests of the ant species Polyrhachis queenslandica.

== Subspecies ==
- Arhopala wildei wildei (Australia, from Cape York to Kuranda)
- Arhopala wildei soda (Tagula, Woodlark Island)
- Arhopala wildei neva (New Guinea)
