= Queensland Heritage Council =

The Queensland Heritage Council is an independent statutory authority created by the Queensland Parliament under the Queensland Heritage Act 1992. The Council advises and reports to the Minister for Environment and the Great Barrier Reef and is supported by a secretariat provided by the Department of Environment and Science. It is also responsible for maintaining the Queensland Heritage Register.

== Membership ==
The Queensland Heritage Council is composed of:

(a) a representative, appointed by the Governor in Council, of each of the following entities—

(i) the National Trust of Queensland;
(ii) the Local Government Association of Queensland;
(iii) the Queensland Council of Unions;
(iv) an organisation representing the interests of property owners and managers in Queensland;
(v) an organisation representing the interests of rural industries in Queensland; and

(b) 7 persons, appointed by the Governor in Council, with appropriate knowledge, expertise and interest in heritage conservation.

The current members of the Queensland Heritage Council are Debbie Best (Chairperson), Judy Brien, Kathy Davis, Andrew Barnes, Alice Hampson, Ann-Marie Allen, Dr Katie McConnel, Andrew Ladlay, Cr Judith Peters, Stuart Lummis, Claire Wiles and George Seymour (Deputy Chairperson).

== Functions ==
Under the Act, the Queensland Heritage Council has the functions:

(a) to provide strategic advice to the Minister about matters relating to Queensland’s cultural heritage, including, for example, measures necessary to conserve Queensland’s cultural heritage;
(b) to provide information to the community to encourage interest in, and understanding of, Queensland’s cultural heritage;
(c) to advise entities about conserving Queensland’s cultural heritage, including, for example, government entities and community organisations;
(d) to encourage the appropriate management of places of cultural heritage significance; and
(e) to perform other functions given to the council under this Act or by the Minister.

== Queensland Heritage Register ==
The Queensland Heritage Register is a statutory list of places that are protected by the Heritage Act 1992 (QLD). For a place to be entered in the register, it must be nominated and then go through a process of assessment which includes an opportunity for the public to comment. Currently, there are over 1600 places on the Queensland Heritage Register, including the Story Bridge in Brisbane and Paronella Park in Cairns.

== See also ==
- Australian heritage places inventory
- List of heritage registers
