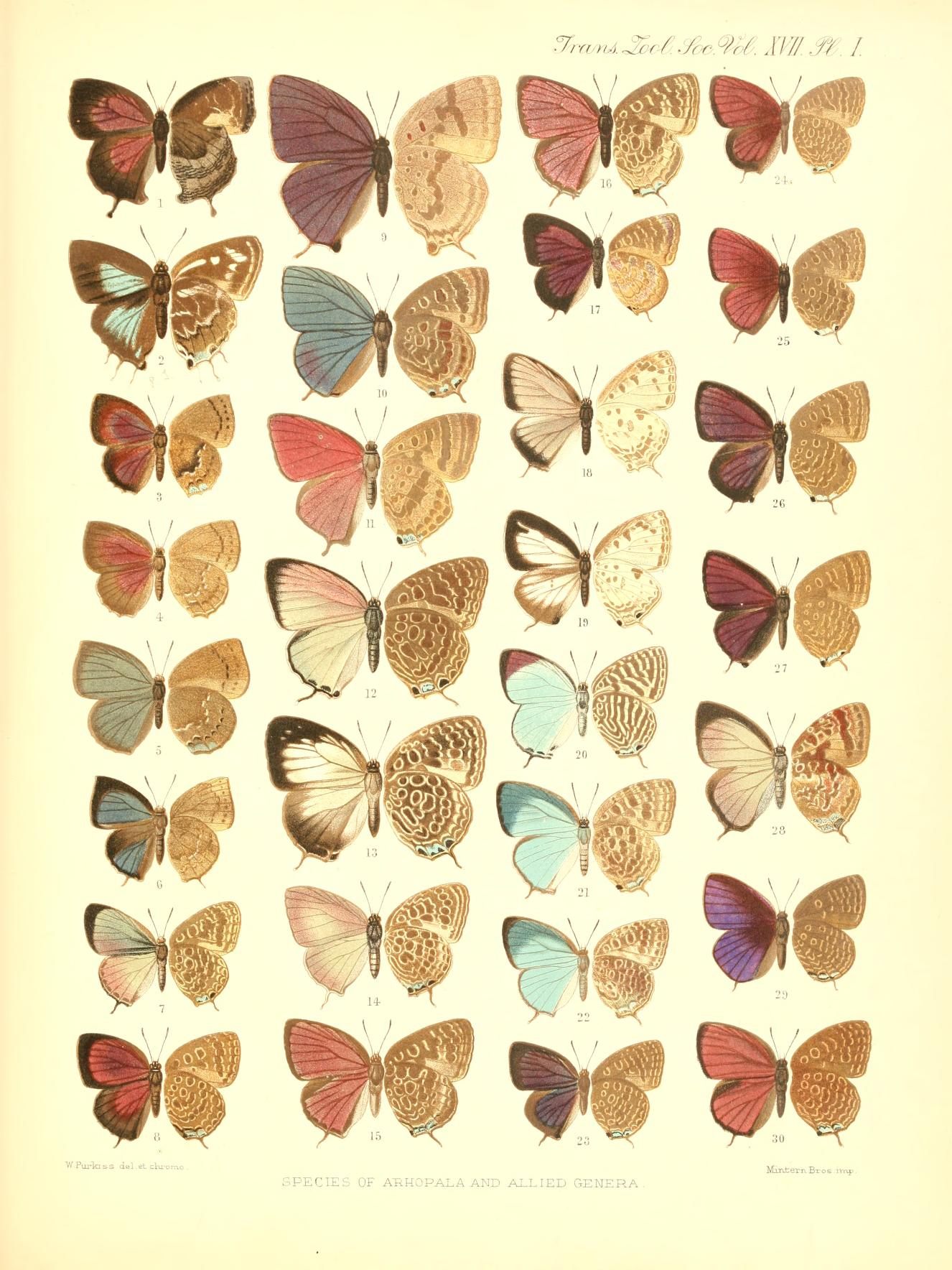
- Arhopala eupolis in Bethune Baker (male, figure 11)

Scientific classification
- Kingdom: Animalia
- Phylum: Arthropoda
- Clade: Pancrustacea
- Class: Insecta
- Order: Lepidoptera
- Family: Lycaenidae
- Genus: Arhopala
- Species: A. eupola

Binomial name
- Arhopala eupola (Miskin, 1890)

Synonyms
- Arhopala centaurus eupolis (Miskin); Arhopala eupolis philtron Fruhstorfer, 1914; Narathura araxes eupolis (Miskin)

= Arhopala eupolis =

Species of butterfly

Arhopala eupolis, is a butterfly in the family Lycaenidae. It was described by William Henry Miskin in 1890. It is found in the Australasian realm.

== Subspecies ==
- A. e. eupolis Queensland, Kai, Aru, New Guinea, Yule, Tagula, St. Aignan
- A. e. asopus Waterhouse & Lyell, 1914 Northwest Australia, Groote Eylandt

== Biology ==
The larva feeds on Dendrophthoe vitellina, Lagerstroemia speciosa, Eucalyptus intermedia, Melaleuca quinquenervia, Terminalia catappa, Terminalia melanocarpa, T. muelleri, and T. sericocarpa.
