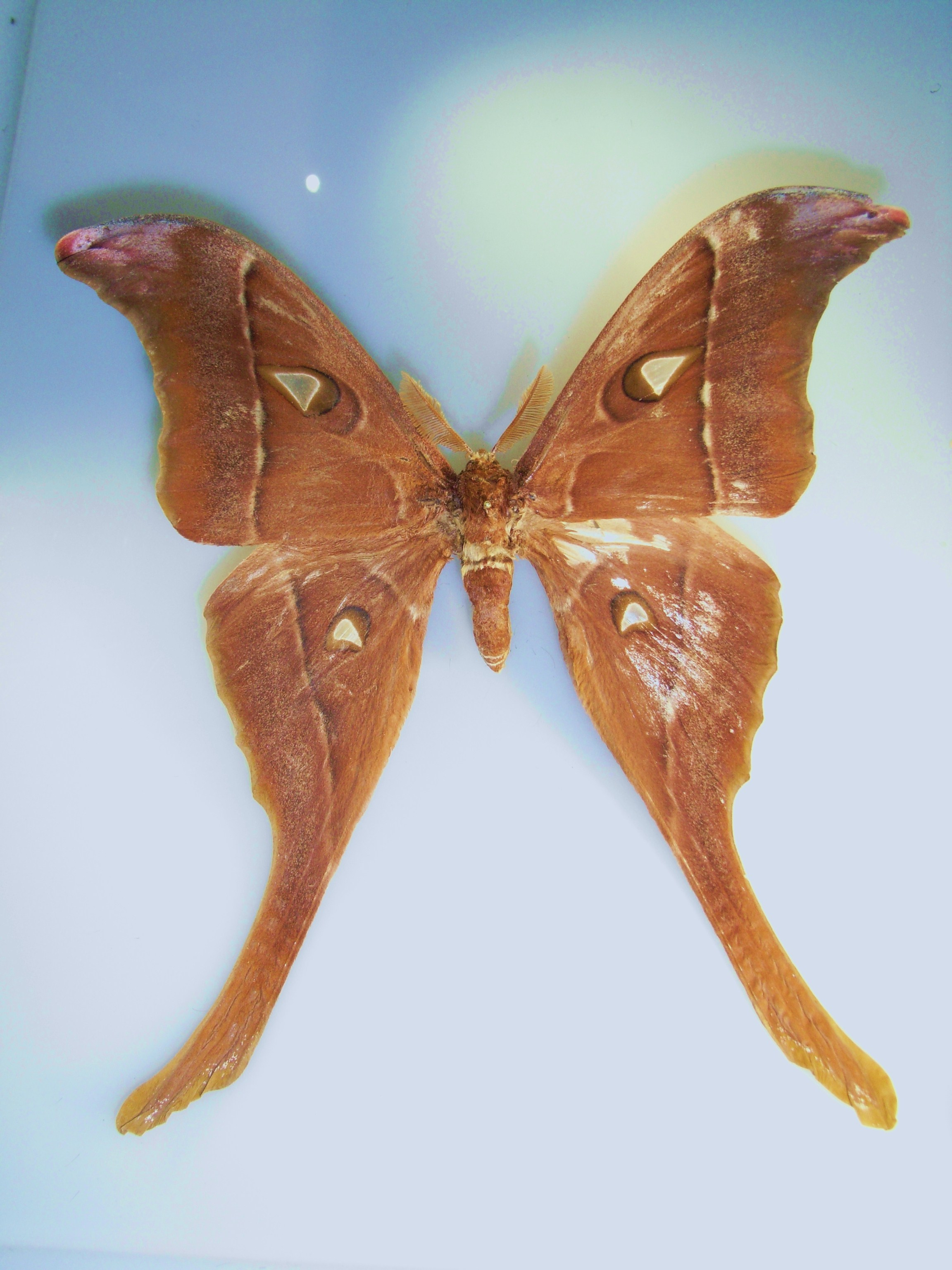
- Mounted male Coscinocera hercules

Scientific classification
- Kingdom: Animalia
- Phylum: Arthropoda
- Clade: Pancrustacea
- Class: Insecta
- Order: Lepidoptera
- Family: Saturniidae
- Tribe: Attacini
- Genus: Coscinocera; Butler, 1879

= Coscinocera =

Genus of moths

Coscinocera is a genus of large moths from the family Saturniidae, that are found in Australasia. The genus was erected by Arthur Gardiner Butler in 1879.

The genus contains Coscinocera hercules, the largest moth in Australia, and the insect with the largest wing surface area.

== Species ==
- Coscinocera amputata Niepelt, 1936
- Coscinocera anteus Bouvier, 1927
- Coscinocera brachyura Biedermann, 1932
- Coscinocera butleri Rothschild, 1895
- Coscinocera eurystheus Rothschild, 1898
- Coscinocera heraclides Joicey & Talbot, 1916
- Coscinocera hercules (Miskin, 1876)
- Coscinocera heros Rothschild, 1899
- Coscinocera joiceyi Bouvier, 1927
- Coscinocera omphale Butler, 1879
- Coscinocera rothschildi Le Moult, 1933
- Coscinocera titanus Niepelt, 1916
