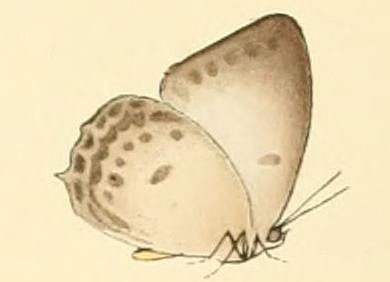

Scientific classification
- Kingdom: Animalia
- Phylum: Arthropoda
- Clade: Pancrustacea
- Class: Insecta
- Order: Lepidoptera
- Family: Lycaenidae
- Genus: Arhopala
- Species: A. disparilis

Binomial name
- Arhopala disparilis (Felder, 1860)

Synonyms
- Amblypodia disparilis Felder, 1860; Amblypodia courvoisieri Ribbe, [1901]

= Arhopala disparilis =

Species of butterfly

Arhopala disparilis is a species of butterfly of the family Lycaenidae. It is found on Serang and Ambon.

== Description ==
Wings above in the male quite light blue, in the female almost white with broad black margins. The male almost looks like a Lampides under surface white with a black double margin. It is similar to Arhopala wildei.
