= Queensland Heritage Act 1992 =

Act of the Parliament of Queensland

- Long title: An Act to provide for the conservation of Queensland’s cultural heritage
- Status: In force

The Queensland Heritage Act 1992 is an act of the Parliament of Queensland that establishes a legislative framework for the registration and protection of places of local and statewide significance. The Act established the Queensland Heritage Council and formalised the Queensland Heritage Register.

In September 2008, the Act was modified to allow the Queensland Government to compel owners to maintain their heritage property or else be fined up to $75,000. The change was motivated by concerns that the heritage-listed Keating residence in Indooroopilly, Brisbane was being inadequately maintained by its owners. Left unoccupied, the building had been neglected and needed urgent maintenance, which was not being undertaken despite repeated requests. Following the changes to the Act, the owners were served with a maintenance notice to repair doors and windows, clear the drains, and "fence and mow" the yard.
