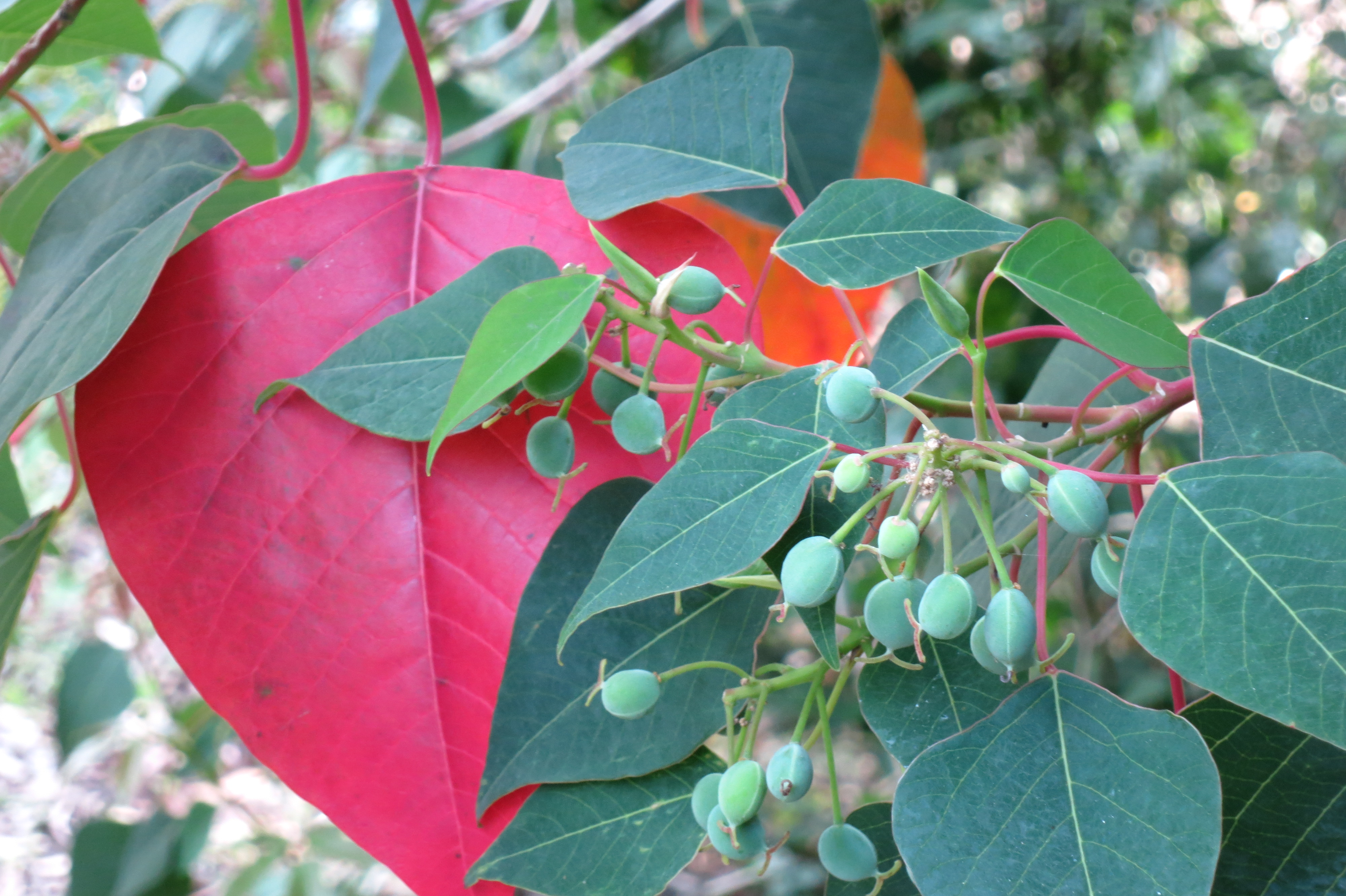
- Bleeding heart leaves and seed pods

Conservation status
- Least Concern (IUCN 3.1)

Scientific classification
- Kingdom: Plantae
- Clade: Tracheophytes
- Clade: Angiosperms
- Clade: Eudicots
- Clade: Rosids
- Order: Malpighiales
- Family: Euphorbiaceae
- Genus: Homalanthus
- Species: H. populifolius

Binomial name
- Homalanthus populifolius Graham

Synonyms
- Omalanthus populifolius; Amalanthus populifolius

= Homalanthus populifolius =

Bleeding heart

Species of tree

Homalanthus populifolius, the bleeding heart, native poplar or Queensland poplar, is an Australian rainforest plant in the family Euphorbiaceae. It often appears in areas of rainforest disturbance. Rainforest regenerators highly regard Bleeding heart because of its fast growth and use as a pioneer species in rainforest regeneration.

Bleeding heart grows from the coastal border of New South Wales and Victoria (36° S), north to Coen, Queensland (13° S) in the tropics. It is also native to Lord Howe Island, Norfolk Island, Papua New Guinea and Solomon Islands, and has been widely planted elsewhere.

It is the host plant for Australia's largest moth, the Hercules moth (Coscinocera hercules).

== Description ==
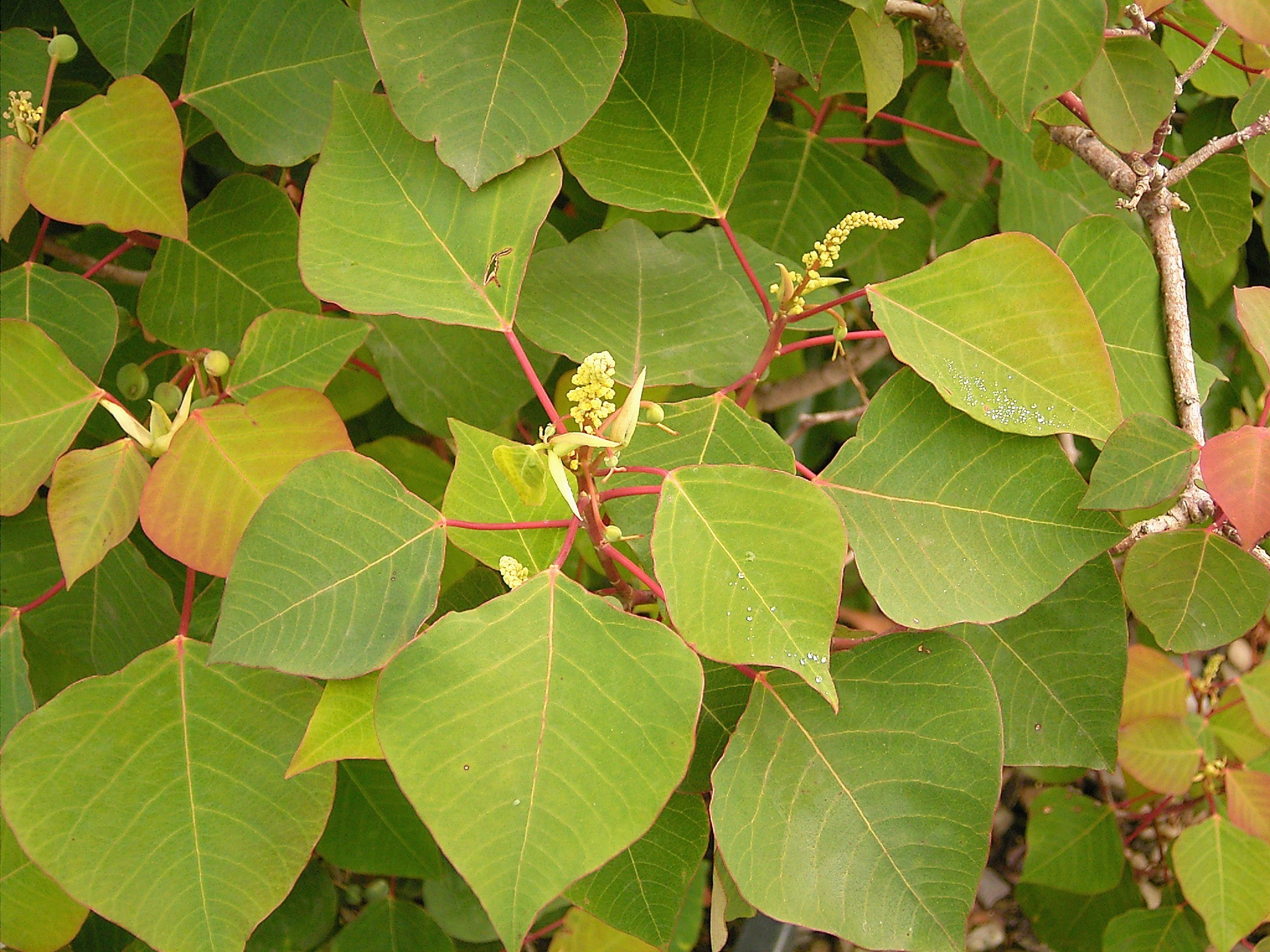
Leaves with flowers emerging

It is a small tree or shrub, up to 8 meters tall and a trunk 15 cm in diameter.

The trunk is cylindrical with greyish-brown bark, fairly smooth but with some bumps and irregularities. Branchlets appear thick, reddish or green. The leaves are triangular, not toothed and alternate, 5 to 15 cm long, and like those of a poplar (giving rise to the species epithet populifolius). The leaves turn red when senescent, hence the common name of bleeding heart.

The flowers are yellow-green to red and 2 to 10 cm long. They appear on racemes mostly from September to December. The fruit matures from December to March, a two-lobed capsule with an oily yellow aril. The seeds germinate quickly when the warmth of direct sunlight is available. However, as with many pioneer species, the seeds of the bleeding heart have a long dormancy period.

The fruit is eaten by a variety of birds, including brown cuckoo dove, silvereye and Lewin's honeyeater.

== Uses ==
The small size and decorative red leaves make this an attractive garden plant. However, its characteristics as a pioneer species also make it a good invader in disturbed areas. It is considered an invasive species in southern Africa, Hawaii and New Zealand. The Sa'dan Toraja people crush the leaves with mud to create a black dye for funeral clothing

== Image gallery ==
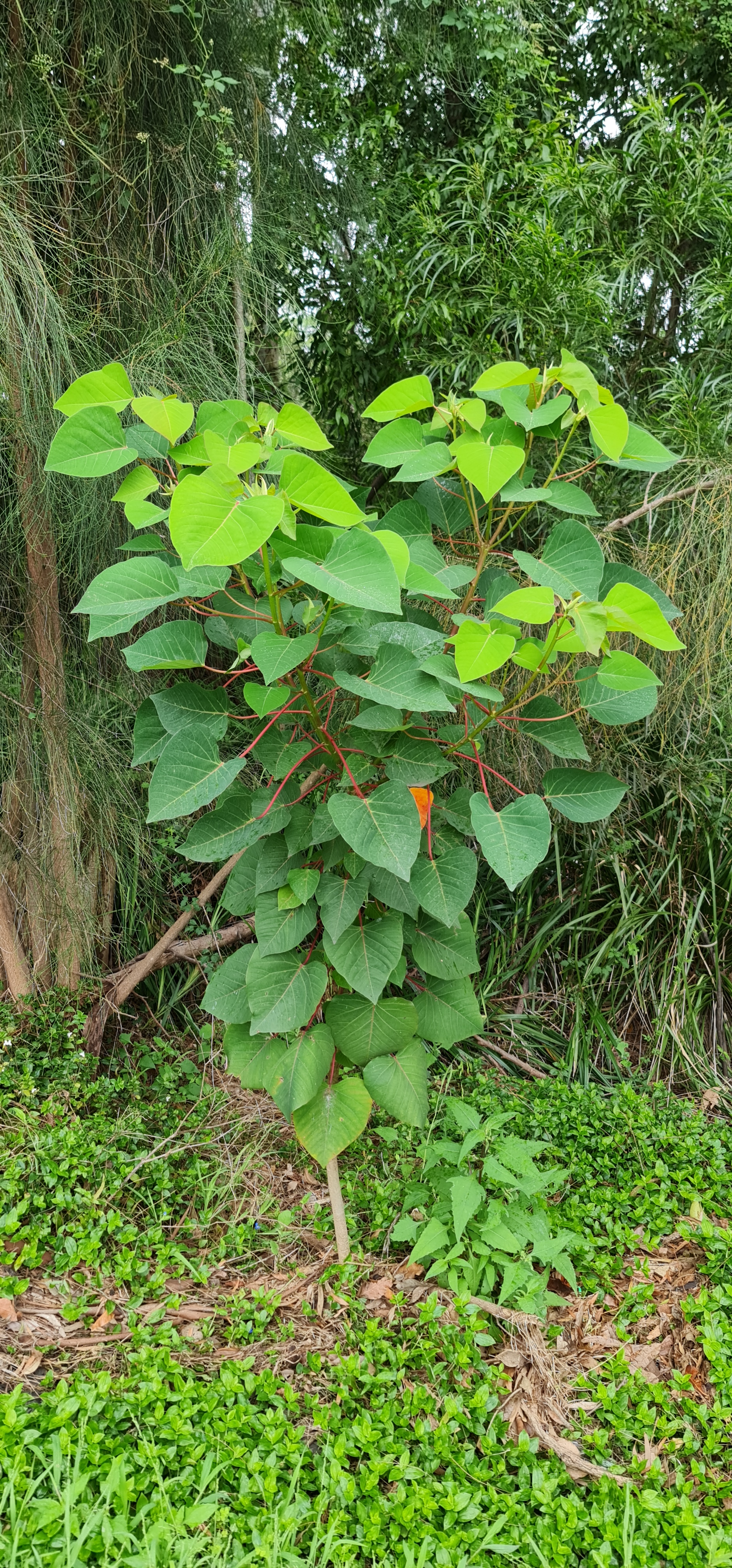

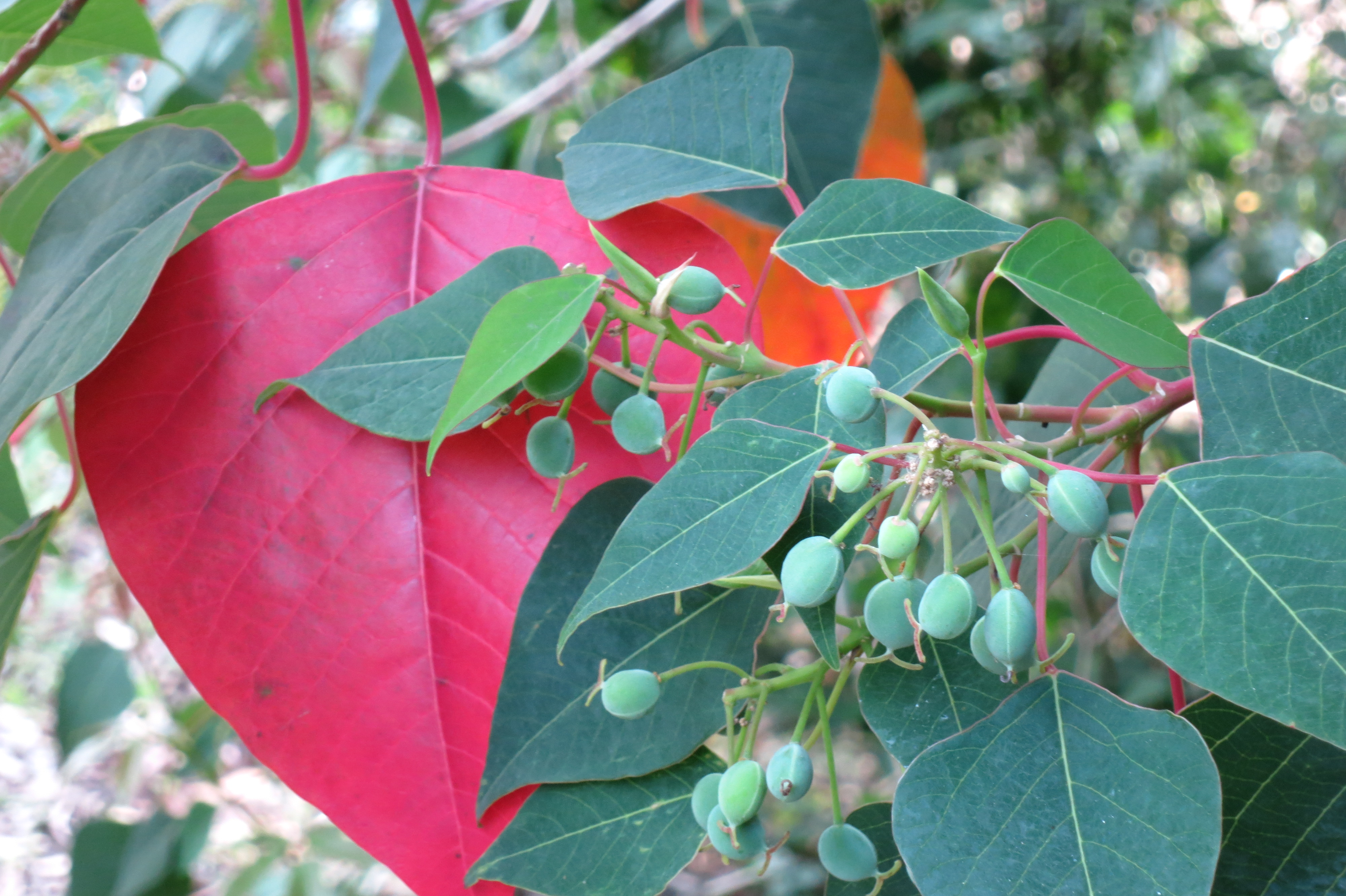

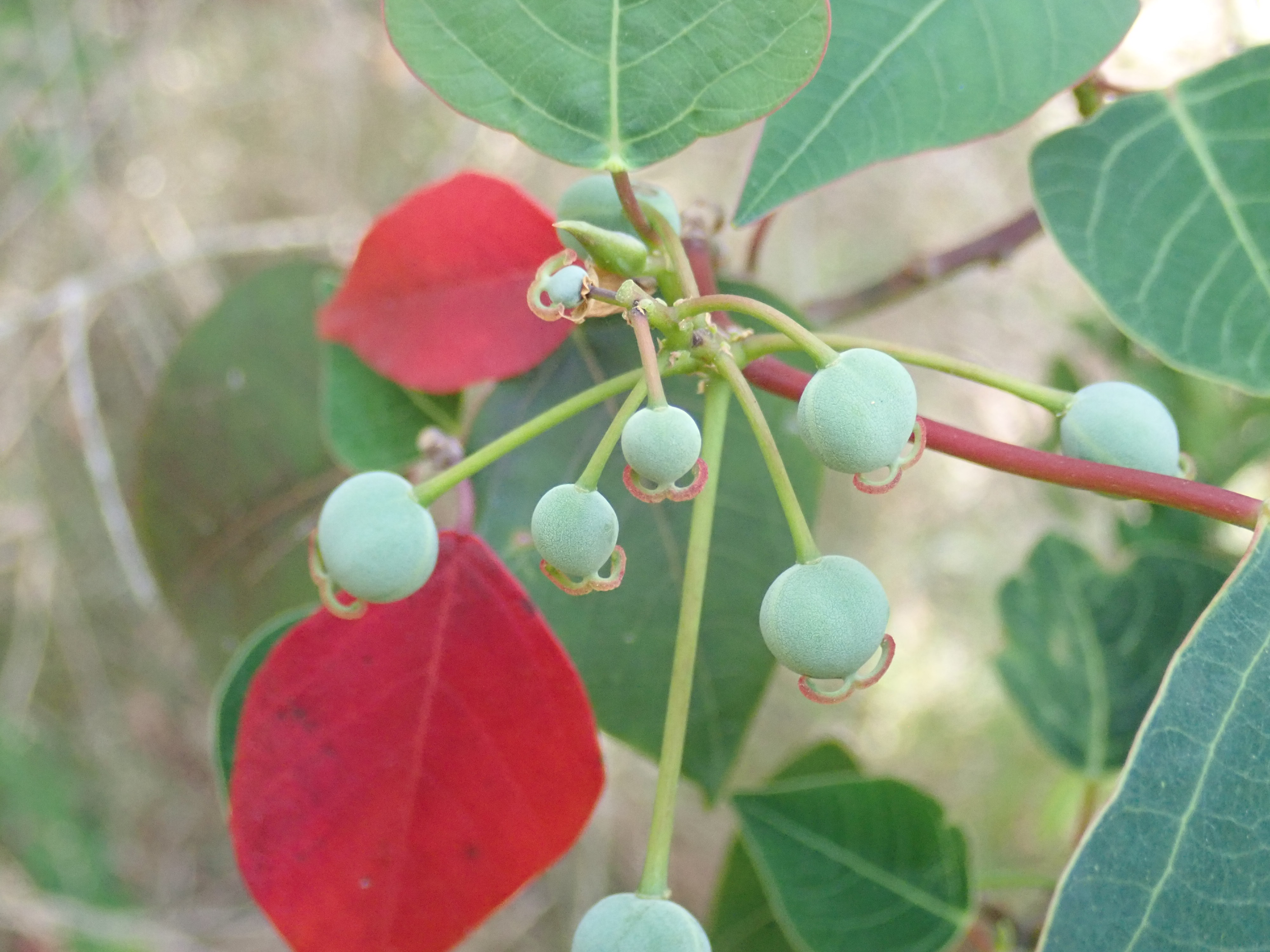

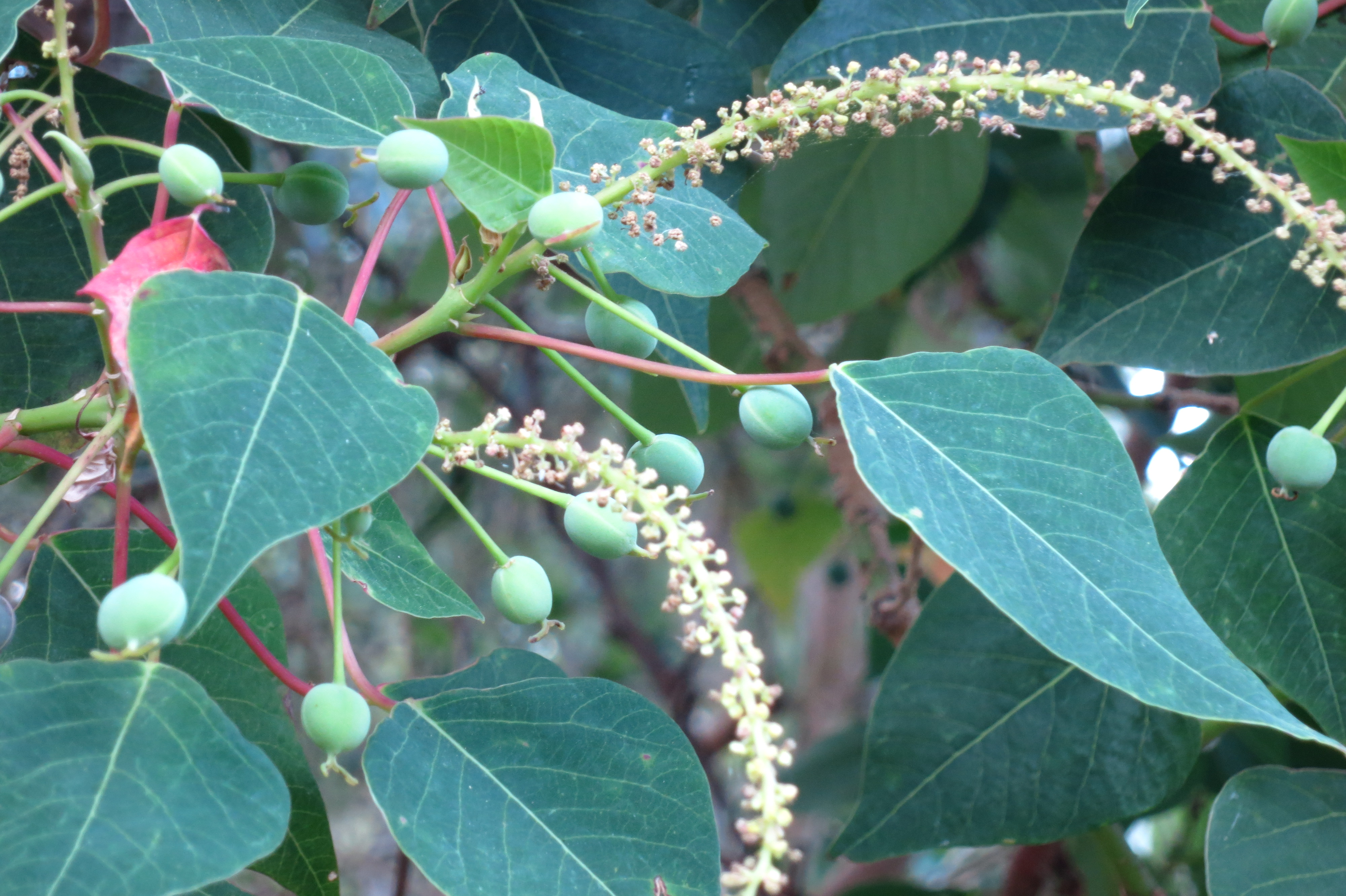

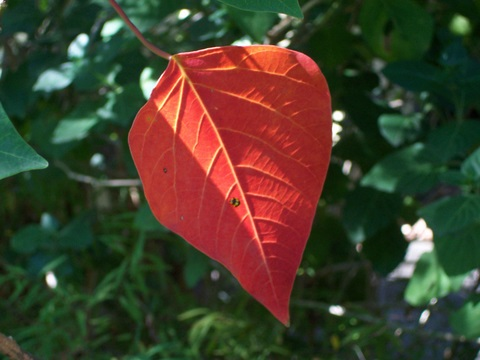
Senescent leaf
