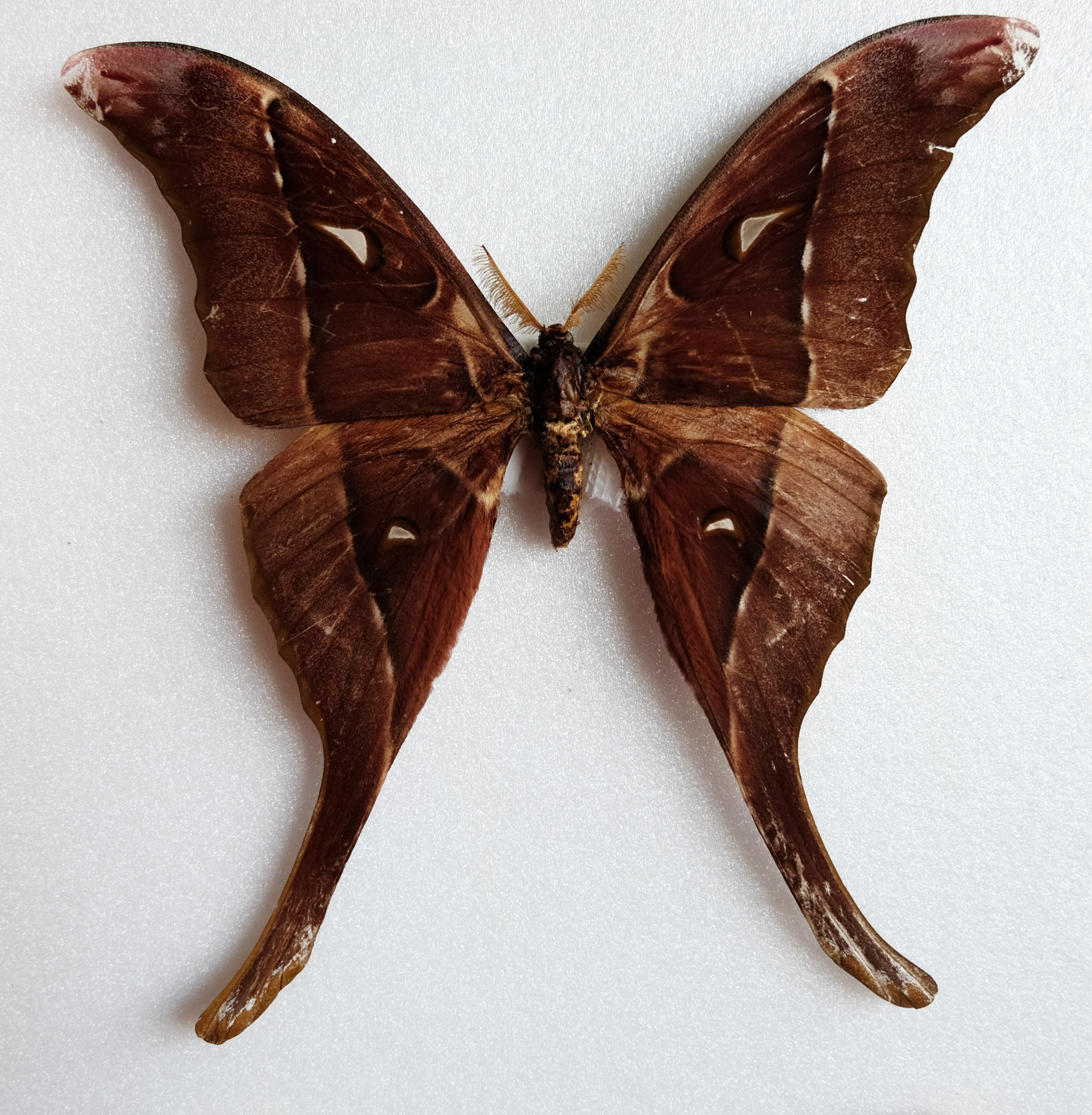
- Mounted male

Scientific classification
- Kingdom: Animalia
- Phylum: Arthropoda
- Clade: Pancrustacea
- Class: Insecta
- Order: Lepidoptera
- Family: Saturniidae
- Genus: Coscinocera
- Species: C. hercules

Binomial name
- Coscinocera hercules Miskin, 1876

= Coscinocera hercules =

Hercules moth

Species of moth

Coscinocera hercules, the Hercules moth, is a moth of the family Saturniidae, endemic to New Guinea and northern Australia. The species was first described by William Henry Miskin in 1876.

== Description ==
Adults have a wingspan of about 27 cm (11 in), making it the largest moth found in Australia, and its wings have the largest documented surface area - 300 cm^{2} (47 in^{2}) - of any living insect. They are mainly colored golden-brown and white, with transparent spots on each of the four wing sections – the coloring and patterns between sexes is mostly static. However, adult males have longer, slimmer tails on their wings than females do, making it somewhat easy to differentiate them in this way.

Their larvae grow up to 12 cm (about 4.7 in), and will weigh around 54 grams in their final instar. They are a pale-blue or green color, with red dots along their sides and yellow spines.

== Diet ==
As an adult, the Hercules moth does not eat. Instead, they survive on food stores from when they were a larva. The larvae feed on the leaves of a number of rainforest trees including Dysoxylum mollissimum, Glochidion ferdinandi, Homalanthus populifolius, Polyscias elegans, Timonius rumphii, and Timonius singularis.

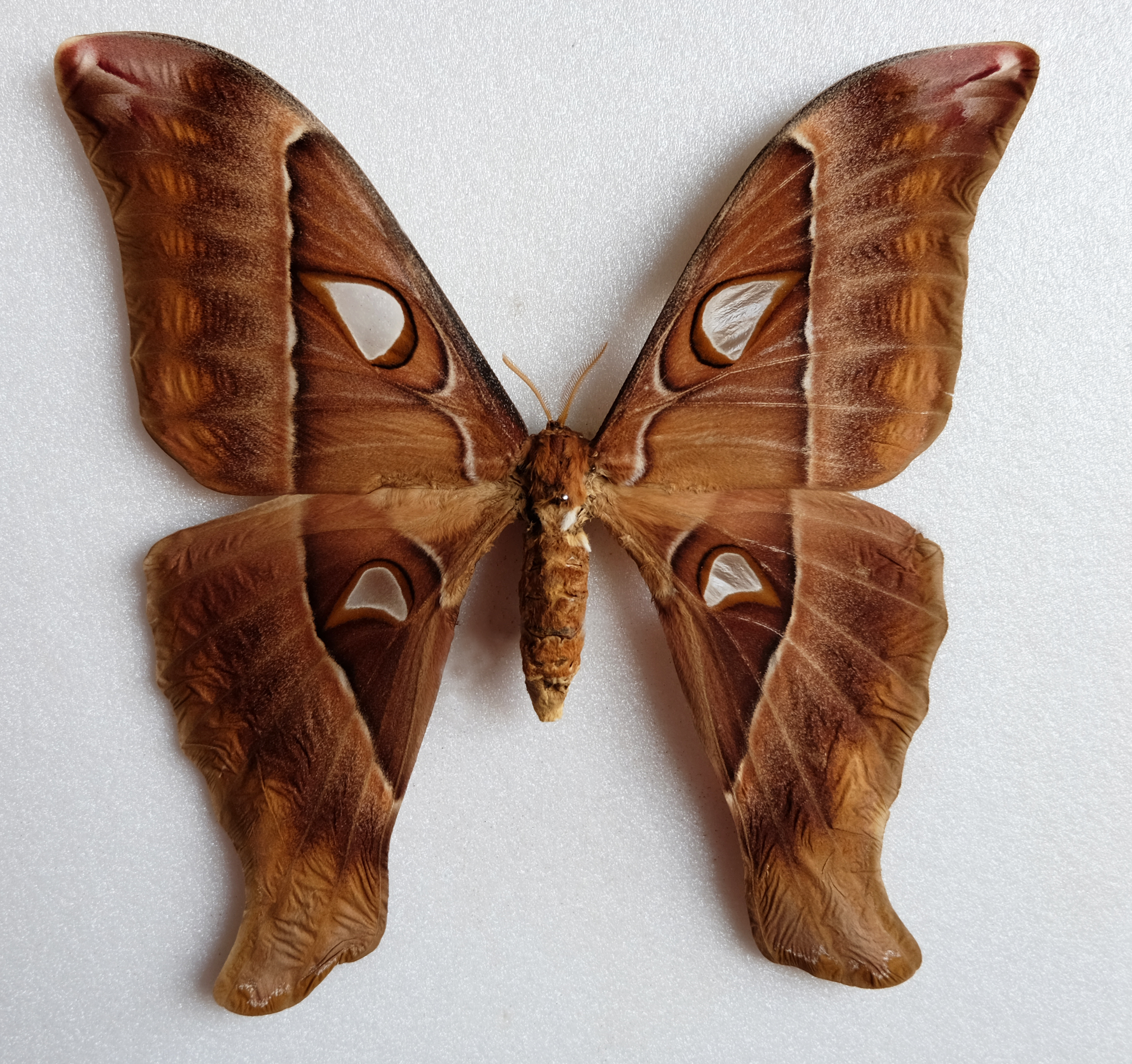
Mounted Female

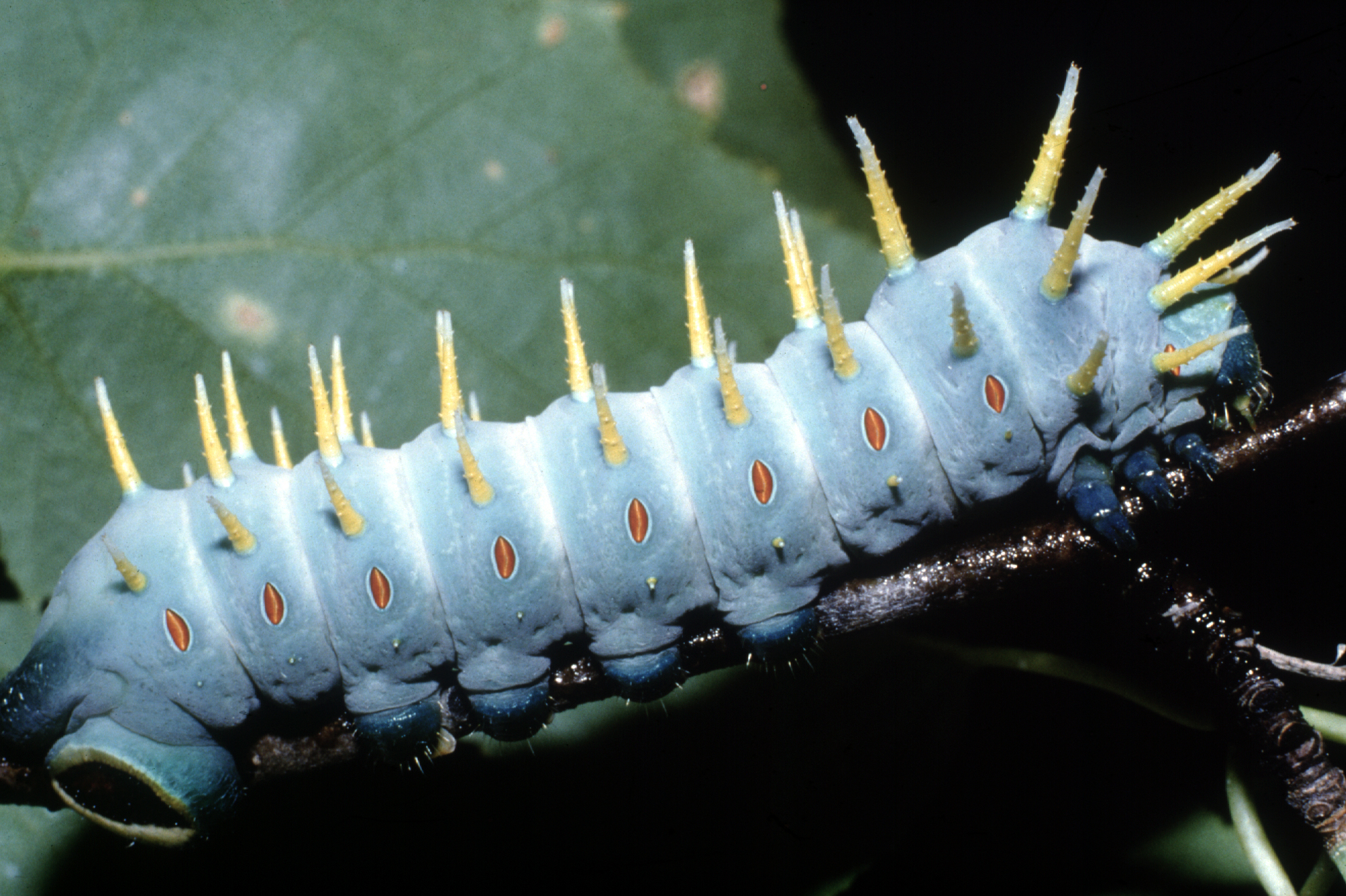
Larva
