= Australian heritage places inventory =

The Australian Heritage Places Inventory (AHPI) was an online database of information about Australian places listed in State, Territory and Commonwealth Heritage Registers. The database was supported by the Heritage, Reef and Marine Division of the Department of Agriculture, Water and the Environment, which withdrew support of the database in 2020, and the database was taken down.

== Contributing heritage registers ==
- ACT Heritage Register
- Western Australian Register of Heritage Places
- Northern Territory Heritage Register (NT)
- New South Wales State Heritage Register
- Queensland Heritage Register
- Register of the National Estate
- South Australian Heritage Register
- Tasmanian Heritage Register
- Victorian Heritage Register

== See also ==
- Australian Heritage Database
