= Shire of Taringa =

Local government area of Queensland, Australia

Coordinates: 27.4991°S 152.975°E

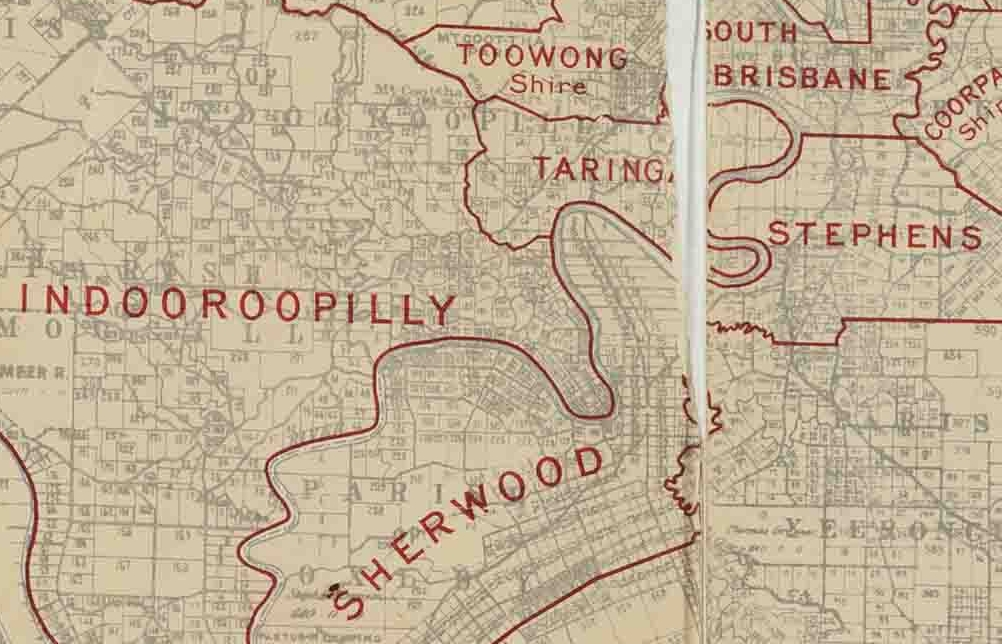
Map of Taringa Division and adjacent local government areas, March 1902

The Shire of Taringa is a former local government area of Queensland, Australia, located in western Brisbane. Its administrative centre was Taringa (now a suburb of City of Brisbane). It existed from 1890 to 1925.

== History ==
Toowong Division was one of the original divisions created on 11 November 1879 under the Divisional Boards Act of 1879. On 20 May 1880, the more populated area of the district was proclaimed as the Shire of Toowong, with the remaining part of the Toowong Division being renamed Indooroopilly Division on 2 June 1880.

In 1890, residents in the Taringa area of the Indooroopilly Division began to agitate for the establishment of a separate division for Taringa. Their rationale was that the area around Taringa railway station had grown in population and was of a suburban character and that the interests of this community were different from those of the farming community that comprised the rest of Indooroopilly Division. On 11 October 1890, Taringa Division was separated from Indooroopilly Division.

With the passage of the Local Authorities Act 1902, Taringa Division became a Shire on 31 March 1903.

On 1 October 1925, the Shire of Taringa was amalgamated into the City of Brisbane.

== Chairmen ==
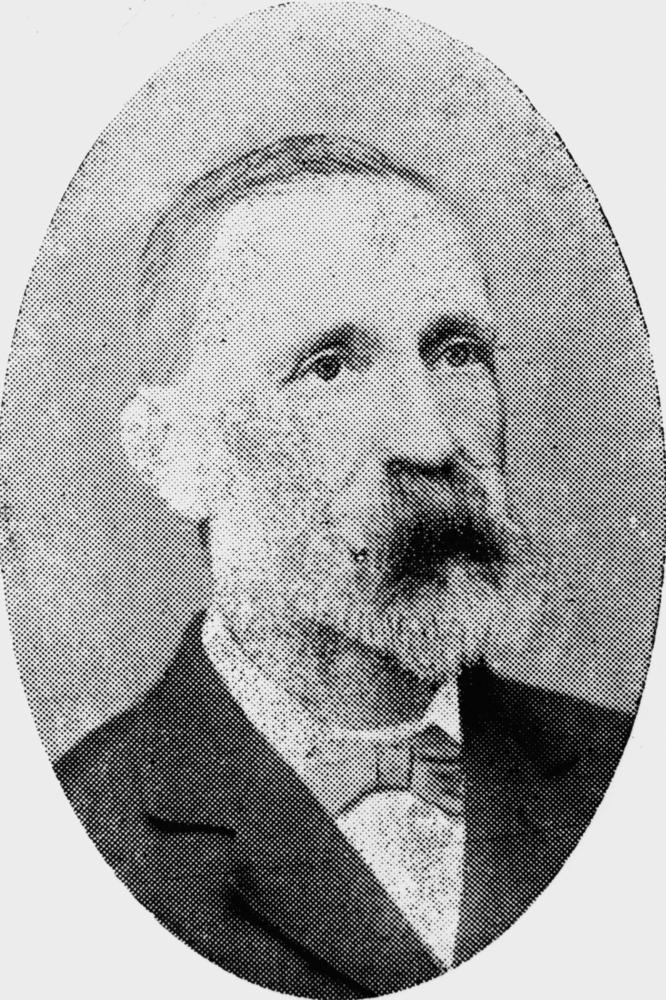
A. D. Guyatt, chairman of the Taringa Shire Council, 1909

- 1900: Mr Guyatt
- 1909: A.D. Guyatt
- 1925: A. Burton
