= Coorparoo Substation No. 210 =

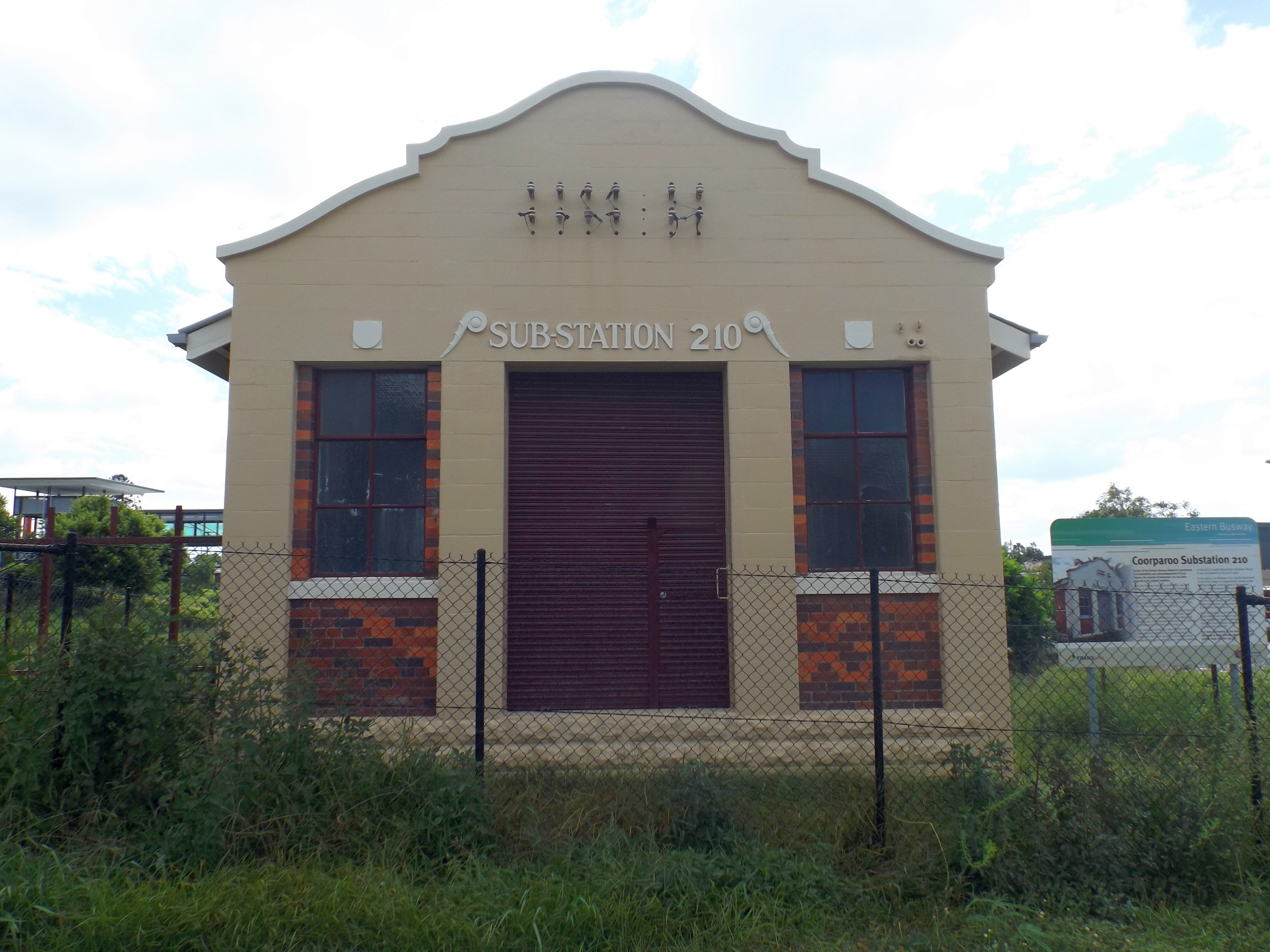
- Front view, 2015

- Location within Queensland Location within Australia
- 27.4982°S 153.0505°E
- Location: 12 Main Avenue, Coorparoo, City of Brisbane, Queensland, Australia

History
- Design period: 1919–1930s (interwar period)
- Built: 1930

Site notes
- Architect: Reyburn Jameson
- Architectural style: Spanish Mission

Queensland Heritage Register
- Official name: Coorparoo Substation No. 210, Substation 10
- Type: state heritage (built)
- Designated: 1 August 2005
- Reference no.: 602495
- Significant period: 1930–c. 1977 (historical); 1930s (fabric)
- Significant components: sign, furniture/fittings, electricity substation, views to
- Builders: A. Mason

Coorparoo Substation No. 210 is a heritage-listed electrical substation at 12 Main Avenue, Coorparoo, City of Brisbane, Queensland, Australia. It was designed by Reyburn Jameson and built in 1930 by A. Mason. It is also known as Substation 10. It was added to the Queensland Heritage Register on 1 August 2005.

== History ==
The former BCC Coorparoo Substation No. 210 is located on Main Street, Coorparoo, at the southeast corner of Langlands Park, next to the Buranda Bowls Club. The small, one storey concrete block and brick utility building was designed by the City Architect's Office and was commissioned in 1930. It supplied the area's series street lighting system until some time before 1977.

The history of electricity supply and distribution began in Brisbane in 1882, with the demonstration of eight arc light street lamps, which were powered by J.W. Sutton and Company's steam engine, housed in Adelaide Street. The first electricity generating and distribution systems to supply private consumers had started operation in Great Britain and the United States in the same year.

In 1887 the company Barton and White was formed, and in 1888 it had a powerhouse operating in Edison Lane, behind the General Post Office, the latter becoming the first consumer to be supplied by an electrical supply undertaking in Australia. Barton and White's Direct Current (DC) dynamo produced 100 volts to power the post office's arc lights. By 1896 Barton and White had become the Brisbane Electric Supply Company. In 1904 the latter became the City Electric Light Company (CEL). After the closure of the powerhouse at Edison Lane in 1899, CEL operated a powerhouse at 69 Ann Street until 1915, and another in William Street from 1912 to 1930.

In 1893 Thargomindah was the first town in Queensland, outside Brisbane, to have an electrical supply. It was also the first town in Australia to use municipally owned electric streetlights, and the first to have a hydroelectric plant, supplied by an Electric Authority. Charters Towers' electrification followed in 1897, with Rockhampton in 1898, and Toowoomba in 1905. By 1914, six towns outside Brisbane had electricity.

Brisbane's first electric trams ran in 1897, and the Brisbane Tramways Company operated a power station at Countess Street between 1896 and 1929. The power station produced 600 volt DC, which was only useful for short-distance transmission. As the tram routes expanded, it became necessary to build a power station at Light Street, Fortitude Valley (1913), and one at Logan Road, Woolloongabba (1915). Some businesses sited alongside the tram routes drew electricity from the tramways' DC mains. In 1922 the Brisbane Tramways Trust took over the network, and in 1925 the tramways were transferred to the new Greater Brisbane Council. At this time there were four power stations in Brisbane: the three tramways power stations, and CEL's Williams Street power station.

The three power stations that the BCC had inherited were having difficulty coping with supplying both the expanding tramways, and the suburbs of Ithaca and Toowong. Other pre-amalgamation local authorities had purchased their electricity in bulk from CEL, under ten-year agreements, and the last of those agreements did not expire until 1935. Until then the BCC had to continue to purchase electricity for the areas concerned from CEL, which refused to sell its assets at a price agreeable to the BCC. CEL built the Bulimba power station in 1926, and continued to supply the central city and South Brisbane after 1935.

In 1925 the Brisbane City Council was faced with an obsolete electricity network, and decided that it needed to upgrade its own generation capacity and infrastructure. This led to rapid expansion in the late 1920s, as a co-ordinated, uniform distribution system was developed. The BCC encouraged the public to connect to existing supply lines, and promoted electrical appliances at its own showrooms. After the New Farm power station became operational in June 1928, under the BCC Tramways Department, the three obsolete power stations were closed.

The New Farm power station delivered 11 kV AC to the main control substations of the Tramways Department and the ESD, via underground, paper-insulated, lead-covered, double-wire cables. Eleven tramway substations were commissioned between 1927 and 1939, including a main control substation at Ballow Street. The other stations were automated. Roy Rusden Ogg, the BCC Tramways Department's architect, designed all eleven tramway substations, which were built as large brick boxes, in an austere classical idiom. Transformers in the substations reduced the incoming voltage, while converters changed the current from AC to DC, supplying 600 volt DC to the tramways system.

Alternating Current could be easily converted from one voltage to another by transformers, which made for economic long-distance transmission. High voltage (low current) could be sent by thin wires, instead of thick copper cables, and could then be "stepped down" at load centres, to 415 volts, three phase, or 250 volts, single phase, for consumers. The adoption of AC thus enabled the electrification of large urban areas, and eliminated the need for multiple local power plants. The system of BCC substations built in the late 1920s and 1930s demonstrates this shift to AC distribution, which was an important step in the modernisation of Brisbane.

Meanwhile, Queensland's rural electrification, despite its promising start, was lagging behind the other States. In 1936 the Royal Commission On Electricity reported that, in units generated per head of population, Queensland ranked last in Australia. By 1936 there were 62 Electricity undertakings in Queensland. Of these, 51 generated power and 41 were local authorities. Production was heavily tilted in favour of Brisbane. The BCC had an installed capacity for generating 56,250 kilowatts (New Farm), and CEL could generate 37,500 Kilowatts (Bulimba). Cairns ranked next, at 4,400 kilowatts, followed by Townsville at 3,810 kilowatts, and Toowoomba at 2,400 kilowatts. Of the 152,000,000 units of electricity used in Queensland in 1935, only 30,000,000 units were used outside South East Queensland.

In Brisbane, as each local authority's ten-year agreement with CEL expired, that area's public electricity supply was sourced from New Farm, via ESD substations. The main transmission system carried 11 kV AC from New Farm to the main control substations, which were built in a distribution loop. Four 11 kV main control substations were built by the BCC in 1928: Victoria Park (No.4), Lang Park (No.6), Victoria street Woolloongabba (No.9), and Cairns Street, Kangaroo Point (No.11). By 1930, Balmoral (No.12), Stephens (No.13), and Hamilton (No. 5) had been added. They were all made of brick, and were designed to harmonise with existing residential buildings. One 5 kV main control substation was also in ESD operation in 1930. Underground cables linked the main control substations to automated substations, the distribution being controlled from a room in City Hall.

Coorparoo Shire's electricity supply agreement with CEL ended in 1930, as did the agreements with the Balmoral, Hamilton and Stephens Shires. Coorparoo's first subdivision had occurred in 1882, horse trams reached Buranda in 1887, and the Shire of Coorparoo was formed in 1888. In 1889 there were 2500 people in area, but the 1893 flood slowed development and reduced the number of houses in Coorparoo. By 1900 the settlement was dense from Stones Corner to Kirkland Avenue, but was otherwise bush and farmhouses. The electric tramway reached Stones Corner in 1902, and Coorparoo Junction in 1915, which fuelled suburban expansion. House numbers doubled in ten years, from 1911 to 1921.

The decision to gradually change Brisbane's street lighting to the series system was taken in 1927, and the BCC decided to switch Balmoral and Coorparoo's street lighting to the series system in May 1930. In a parallel circuit system, each item receives its own full voltage from the power supply, but in the series system the current flows through each item in turn, in a loop from the power source. A series street lighting circuit usually consisted of about 100 lamps, and required a minimum of 2000 volts. If more lamps were added, a higher voltage was required to maintain the necessary current. If a lamp burnt out, two metal disks would carry the current and maintain the circuit. Incandescent street lights had become economically practical by 1917, and Brisbane developed its street lighting system using incandescent lamps, in series. The only other towns to use the series system for street lighting, since they had AC generators, were Maryborough, Mackay, Townsville and Cairns. Other towns used incandescent lights on the parallel system.

The substation on Main Avenue, Coorparoo, was seen as the initial step towards controlling the whole of the street lighting system on the south side of the Brisbane River from one source. Tenders were offered in August 1930, and A. Mason was accepted. The City Architect's Office drew up the plans. The City Architect at the time was Alfred Herbert Foster, but assistant architect Rayburn Jameson signed the plans for the Coorparoo substation. Its use of 200-millimetre (7.9 in) concrete blocks was unusual for City Architect's Office designs of the time, and it was the only pre-World War II Brisbane substation to be built of such materials. The substation's brick infill panels are for decorative purposes only.

The Coorparoo substation was unmanned, and was equipped with an 11 kV oil circuit breaker. This was operated by a time switch, fitted with an Astronomic Dial calibrated to suit seasonal variations in sunrise and sunset. The main control substation at Woolloongabba supplied power at 11 kV, which was stepped down to 5 kV at Coorparoo, and fed to a bank of constant current transformers. High and low venting in the substation dissipated the heat generated by the equipment. Initially numbered as ESD substation No.10, it was renumbered as No. 210 when all substations in Brisbane were transferred to the BCC in 1963. To avoid any duplication of numbering, all existing BCC stations were prefixed with the number "2" at this time. Prior to the Coorparoo substation's construction, the ESD had three 5 kV public lighting substation buildings, and 11 public lighting substations on poles (seven 5 kV and four 11 kV). Coorparoo Substation No. 210 was the first BCC 11 kV public lighting substation building. By 1940, there were three such buildings.

In 1949 CEL started constructing the Bulimba B power station, and the BCC started work on a power station at Tennyson. The new stations were commissioned in 1953 and 1955 respectively. When CEL became the Southern Electric Authority (SEA) in 1953, the BCC continued to run the New Farm and Tennyson power stations, and distributed power to the city, whereas the SEA sold power to the BCC, and distributed outside Brisbane. The New Farm power station was transferred to the SEA in 1963, while all substations were handed over to the BCC in the same year. From 1963 onwards, the BCC only distributed power, which was purchased from the SEA. The year 1969 witnessed the disbandment of the tramways system, and the New Farm power station was decommissioned in 1971. On 1 July 1977, the South East Queensland Electricity Board (SEQEB) took over distribution of power in Brisbane, and the BCC's Department of Electricity disappeared.

The series system of street lighting was being replaced with the parallel system by the 1960s. In 1970–71 there were 3135 lamps in series, and 33,951 in parallel. Since the final annual report of the BCC's Department of Electricity, 1976–77, noted that the last of the series system street lighting substations had been disconnected and dismantled during the year, Coorparoo Substation No. 210 would have been disconnected before or during 1977. For a period, the building was leased by the Buranda Bowls Club and used for storage, but it is currently empty.

== Description ==
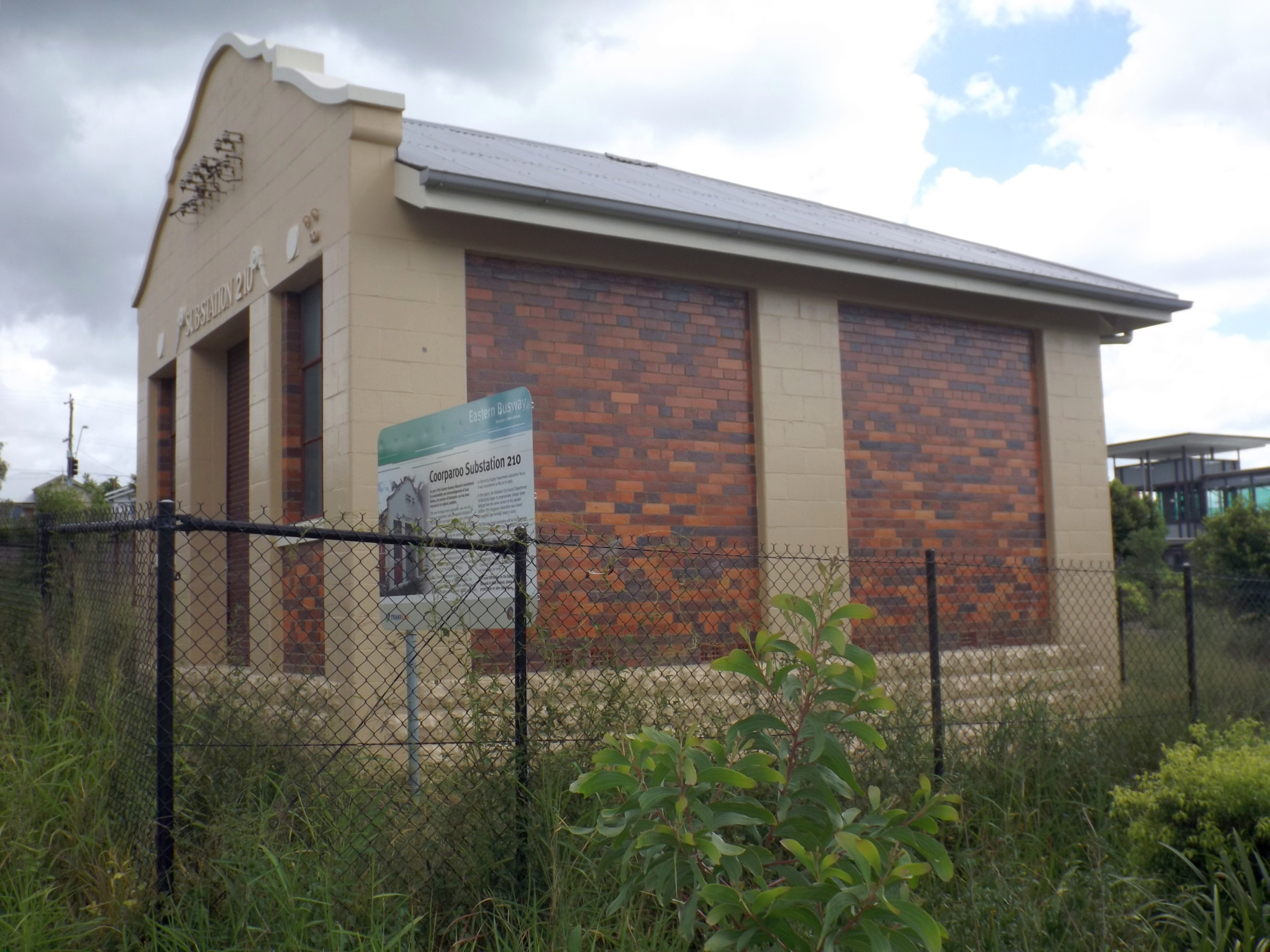
Structure in 2015

The former Coorparoo Substation No.210 faces Main Avenue. A pedestrian gate on the south side of the substation allows access to the clubrooms of the Buranda Bowls Club. The modern clubrooms occupy most of the lot on which the substation stands. The bowling club grounds surround the substation to the west and north, and palm trees screen the north side of the substation.

The modest, freestanding single-storey pavilion is constructed of 200-millimetre (7.9 in) cement blocks, painted white, with recessed infill panels of colonial-bond red brick. It stands on a plinth of rusticated concrete blocks, and on the street elevation the concrete floor is 600 millimetres (24 in) above ground level. The timber-framed hipped roof is clad in corrugated iron, and is truncated on the street elevation by a curved Flemish-influenced gable. Insulators protrude from the upper centre of the gable screen, and two conduit holes remain on the north side of the street elevation. Underneath the gable screen is a steel roller door, inset with a smaller door, or "wicket". Crude timber stairs have been added in front of the wicket. To each side of the roller door there is a metal-framed six-pane obscure wire-glass window, set within a recessed brick panel. The lettering "Sub-Station 210", embellished with a decorative moulded scroll and a plaque on each side, is applied in a band above the roller door.

The north and south elevations have no windows, and two recessed brick panels each. The western elevation has two recessed brick panels, each containing a six-pane obscure wire-glass window. Ventilation is provided by terracotta vents at floor level on the north and south elevations, and by meshed gaps between the top of the walls and the eaves, on three sides. Surface drains run around the base of the building.

The interior is a single volume, unceiled, and lined with a cement-plastered brick. There are the remains of fixtures and machinery mountings on the walls and floor, along with input and output cable connection points. There is a manhole near the roller door, and some hairline cracking in the wall render.

The timber stairs to the wicket in the roller door, and the garden beds on the west and north sides of the substation are not of cultural heritage significance.

== Heritage listing ==
Coorparoo Substation No. 210 was listed on the Queensland Heritage Register on 1 August 2005 having satisfied the following criteria.

The place is important in demonstrating the evolution or pattern of Queensland's history.

Coorparoo Substation No. 210 was part of an integrated network of structures involved in the Brisbane City Council's modernisation of electricity supply in Brisbane in the late 1920s, and 1930s. The reorganisation incorporated the latest developments in the technology of Alternating Current (AC) generation and distribution, which enhanced domestic lifestyles, spurred business development, and aided the expansion of tram routes. The locations chosen for substations also serve as indicators of the main electricity load centres of Brisbane prior to World War II. Coorparoo Substation No. 210 was Brisbane's first 11,000 volt street lighting substation building, and it demonstrates Brisbane's use of the series system for street lighting, which was abandoned in the 1970s.

The place demonstrates rare, uncommon or endangered aspects of Queensland's cultural heritage.

It was rare for the City Architect's Office to use 200-millimetre (7.9 in) concrete blocks in the construction of utilities structures in the 1920s and 1930s. In addition, only three 11,000-volt street lighting substations had been built by 1940, and of the three, only Coorparoo remains in Brisbane City Council (BCC) ownership.

The place is important in demonstrating the principal characteristics of a particular class of cultural places.

As part of a distinctive group of civic utility structures, Coorparoo Substation No. 210 demonstrates the characteristics of a small-scale, robust, masonry substation of the interwar period. Its open internal volume, venting, and roller door are standard features in buildings designed to contain electrical equipment.

The place is important because of its aesthetic significance.

The substation has a landmark quality due to its picturesque design, which was the result of a decision by the City Architect of the period, A.H. Foster, to limit the visual impact of Electrical Supply Department (ESD) substations in residential areas by drawing on contemporary domestic architecture. The small industrial building reflects the prestige that the BCC associated with its electrification drive of the late 1920s and 1930s

The place has a special association with the life or work of a particular person, group or organisation of importance in Queensland's history.

The substation is strongly associated with the BCC, especially its City Architect's Office, and the ESD, which attempted to rationalise Brisbane's electricity supply after the creation of the Greater Brisbane Council in 1925.
