= William Henry Miskin =

Australian solicitor, politician and entomologist

William Henry Miskin (1842 – 1913) was an Australian solicitor, politician and entomologist.

== Early life ==
Born at Guildford, England, William Henry Miskin moved to Victoria, Australia at age 9 and later to Brisbane. He started collecting butterflies as a boy.

== Professional life ==
He trained as a solicitor and was active in local government, becoming the founding President of the Shire of Toowong in 1880. Miskin Street in Toowong is named after him.

== Entomology ==
He published numerous taxonomic papers on Lepidoptera from 1874 to 1892, including a description of Coscinocera hercules. In 1891 he published the Synonymical Catalogue of Butterflies of Australia. He was the President of the Royal Society of Queensland in 1890 and a member of the board of trustees of the Queensland Museum.

== Later life ==
After having an affair with his domestic servant, he abandoned his wife. His wife divorced him in 1894. She subsequently sold his collection and library were purchased by the Queensland Museum.

Miskin worked as a solicitor in Rockhampton until his death in 1913, taking no further role in public life.

== Published works ==
- Miskin, William Henry (1891), Synonymical catalogue of the Lepidoptera Rhopalocera (butterflies) of Australia : with full bibliographical reference, including descriptions of some new species, J.C. Beal, Govt. Printer
