= Shire of Moggill =

Local government area of Queensland, Australia

Coordinates: 27.5103°S 152.9075°E

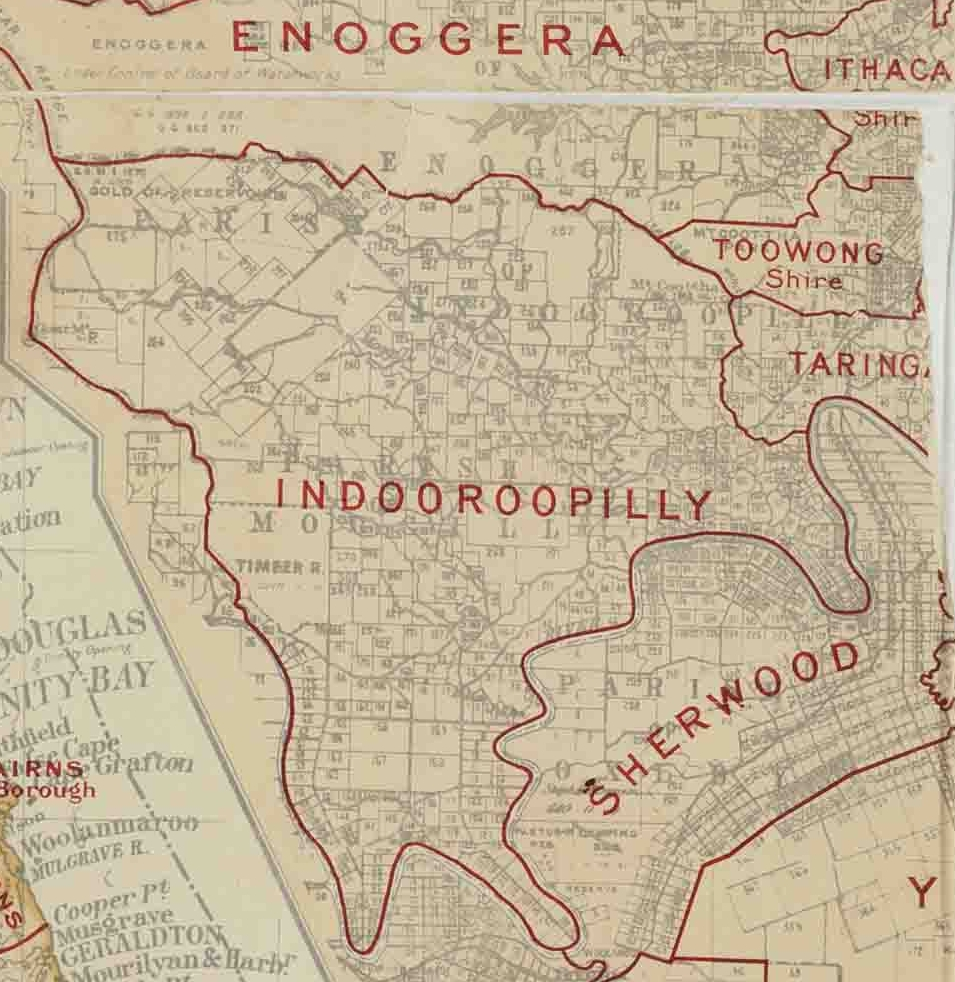
Map of Indooroopilly Division and some adjacent local government areas, March 1902. In addition Indooroopilly Division is adjacent to Brassall Division, Bundanba Division and Purga Division on its western and southern boundaries.

The Shire of Moggill is a former local government area of Queensland, Australia, located in western Brisbane.

== History ==
Toowong Division was one of the original divisions created on 11 November 1879 under the Divisional Boards Act of 1879. On 20 May 1880, the more populated area of Toowong Division was proclaimed as the Shire of Toowong, with the remaining part of the Toowong Division being renamed Indooroopilly Division on 2 June 1880.

In 1890, residents in the Taringa area of the Indooroopilly Division began to agitate for the establishment of a separate division for Taringa. Their rationale was that the area around Taringa railway station had grown in population and was of a suburban character and that the interests of this community were different from those of the farming community that comprised the rest of Indooroopilly Division. On 11 October 1890, Taringa Division was separated from Indooroopilly Division.

On 31 March 1903, the Local Authorities Act 1902 replaced Divisions with Shires and Towns, replacing Indooroopilly Division with Shire of Indooroopilly.

On 8 December 1917, the Shire of Indooroopilly was renamed Shire of Moggill.

On 1 October 1925, the shire was amalgamated into the City of Brisbane.

== Chairmen ==
- 1925: R. McLennan
