= Town of Toowong =

Former local government area of Queensland, Australia

Coordinates: 27.4842°S 152.9885°E

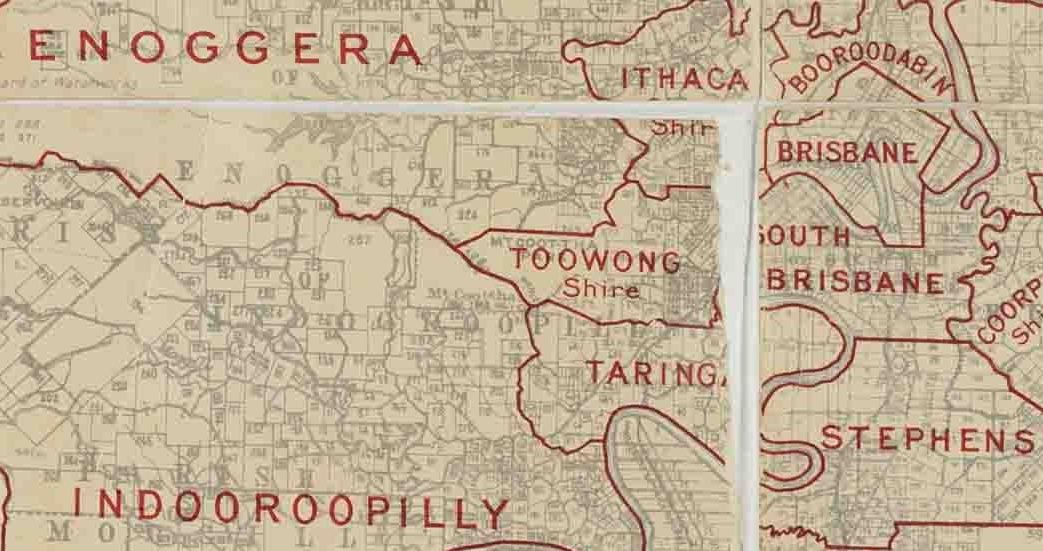
Map of Shire of Toowong and adjacent local government areas, March 1902

The Town of Toowong is a former local government area of Queensland, Australia, located in western Brisbane in the area around the current suburb of Toowong.

== History ==
The Toowong Division was established on 11 November 1879 under the Divisional Boards Act 1879 with a population of 1789.

In May 1880, the more populated part of Toowong Division was proclaimed the Shire of Toowong, while the remaining part of the Toowong Division was renamed Indooroopilly Division.

In 1902, the Local Authorities Act 1902 replaced all Divisions and Boroughs with Towns and Shires, creating the Town of Toowong on 31 March 1903.

On 1 October 1925, it was amalgamated into the City of Brisbane.

== Leaders ==
The following men served as the president of the Shire of Toowong and the mayors of the Town of Toowong.

=== Shire presidents ===
- 1880: William Henry Miskin
- 1881–1884: Augustus Charles Gregory
- 1885–1887: Robert Cribb
- 1888–1890: Augustus Charles Gregory (again)
- 1891–1892: George Anthony Woodstock Kibble
- 1893–1894: Walter Frederick Wilson
- 1895: Augustus Charles Gregory (again)
- 1896: John Standring
- 1897: Charles Patterson
- 1898–1901: Augustus Charles Gregory (again)
- 1902: Charles Frederick Siemon
- 1903: Charles Patterson (again)

=== Town mayors ===
- 1903: Charles Patterson (continued)
- 1904: Sir Augustus Charles Gregory (again, knighted in 1903)
- 1905: William Land
- 1906: George Anthony Woodstock Kibble (again)
- 1907: John Francis Bergin
- 1908: Charles Frederick Siemon (again)
- 1909: Richard John Cottell
- 1910: Thomas Biggs
- 1911: William Land (again)
- 1912: John Hiron
- 1913: John Francis Bergin (again)
- 1914: George Leslie Duff
- 1915–1916: Charles Patterson (again)
- 1917–1918: Alfred Henry Richer
- 1919: Frederick Watts
- 1920: William Henry Booth
- 1921–1923: Charles Patterson (again)
- 1924–1925: Archibald Watson
