= Culture of Brisbane =

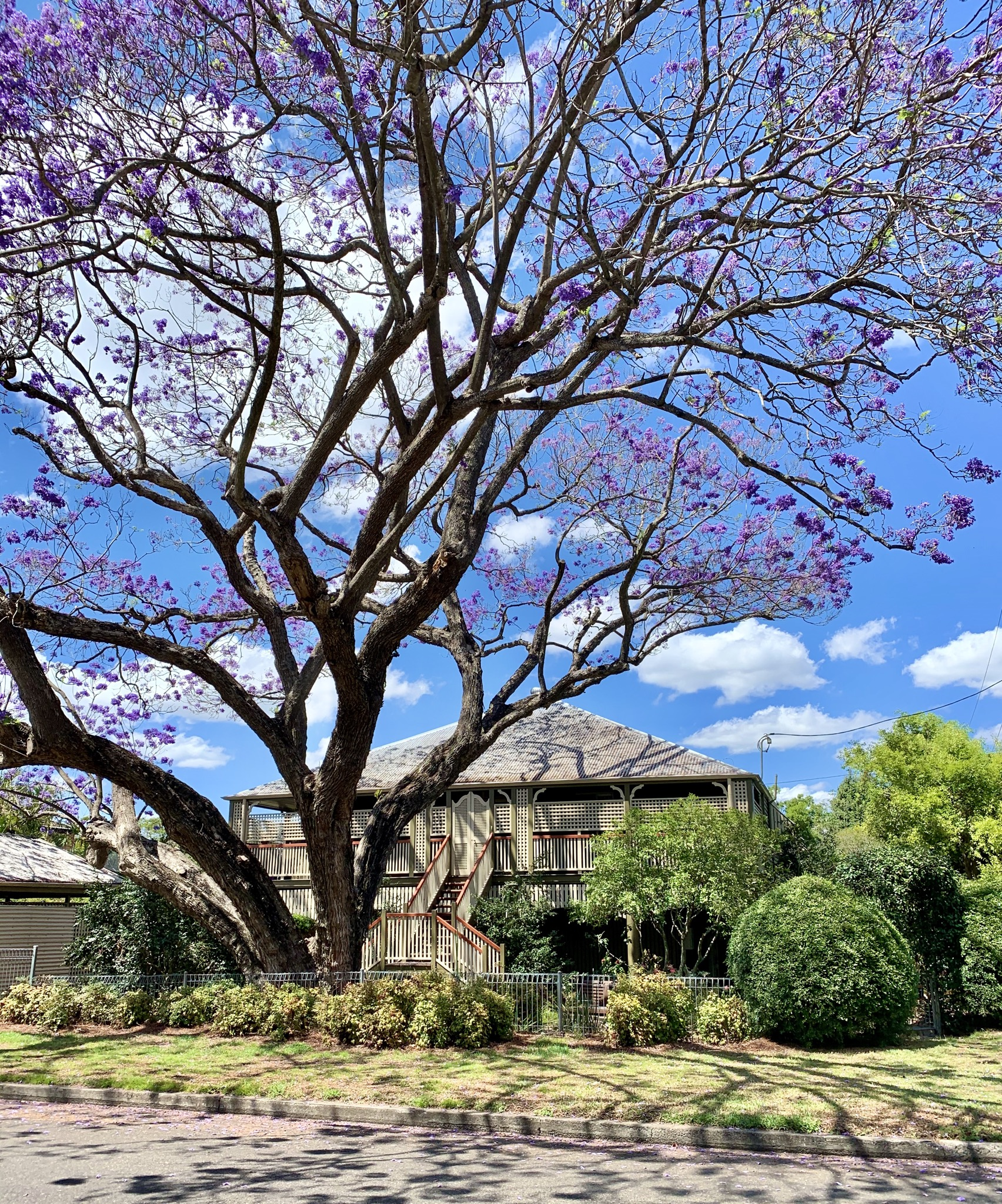
A quintessential image of Brisbane culture; an old Queenslander under jacaranda blossoms, in Chelmer, Brisbane

Brisbane, the capital of Queensland, is a leading cultural centre in Australia and a major arts hub in the Asia-Pacific region, known for its visual and performing arts, literature, music, architecture, cuisine, festivals, and public art.

The city is a key site for Indigenous Australians and South Sea Islanders cultural expression. With a history of diverse migration, Brisbane developed as a major port in the 19th century, attracting migrants from Britain and Ireland, Germany, Italy, China, Russia, and the South Pacific. Today, Brisbane is one of the world’s most multicultural cities, with 31.7 % of its inhabitants born overseas, and more than 200 languages spoken.

Brisbane is home to a range of Australian cultural icons, such as the Brisbane City Hall, the Story Bridge, and the South Bank Parklands. Other symbols often associated with the city include, its hilly terrain, its famous Queenslander architecture, the city’s catamaran ferries known as CityCats as well as the Brisbane River, its signature Jacaranda trees, and its distinct café culture, often housed in converted Queenslanders.

Brisbane has a significant history of social movements; for its role in the global labour movement, becoming the capital of the world's first labour government, as well as the site of Australia's first general strike, and was Australia's primary battleground for civil rights in the mid to late 20th century with protests in the anti-war movement, Indigenous land rights, anti-apartheid, and the Right to March protests which saw the first "phantom marches" take place. The city has been the birthplace of major cultural movements, including the Harvey School in Australian ceramics, for its role in early punk rock and indie pop scenes, and counter-cultural Indigenous movements such as ProppaNOW.

The city regularly hosts major international events, such as the Brisbane Festival, one of Australia’s largest international arts festivals, and the Asia Pacific Triennial of Contemporary Art.

== Nicknames of Brisbane ==
- "River City" – reflecting the Brisbane River which winds through the city.
- "Meanjin" – the original Turrbal Aboriginal name for the area of the Brisbane central business district, occasionally referenced in cultural and literary contexts.
- "Brown Snake" – an affectionate local nickname for the Brisbane River.
- "Brisvegas" – a tongue-in-cheek nickname highlighting the city's perceived lack of nightlife.
- "Sunshine Capital" – a long-standing historical association with the nickname "Australia's sunshine capital," dating back to the early 20th-century.
- "City of Flowers" – an early 20th century poetic nickname, referring to the city’s reputation for its flowering trees and subtropical gardens.
- "Pig City" – derived from the nickname for Brisbane’s music scene in the 1980s, popularised by the book 'Pig City: From the Saints to Savage Garden', and has its origins in the song Pig City.

== Indigenous Cultural Heritage ==
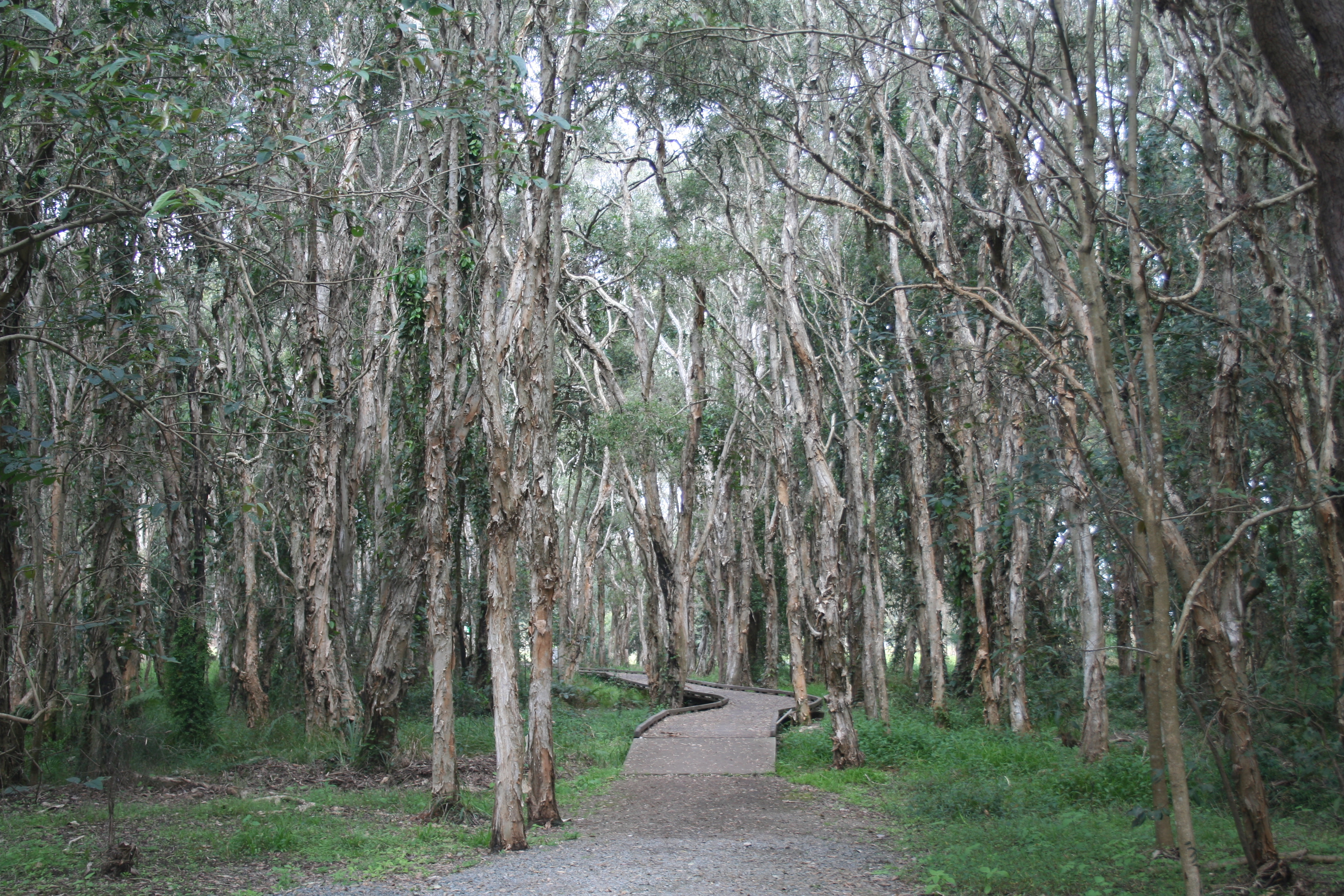
Nudgee Waterhole within the Boondall Wetlands, are Brisbane's largest wetlands, and is the site of an ancient Bora ring.

Brisbane, known as Meanjin to the Turrbal and Jagera peoples, is home to numerous sites of cultural and spiritual significance.

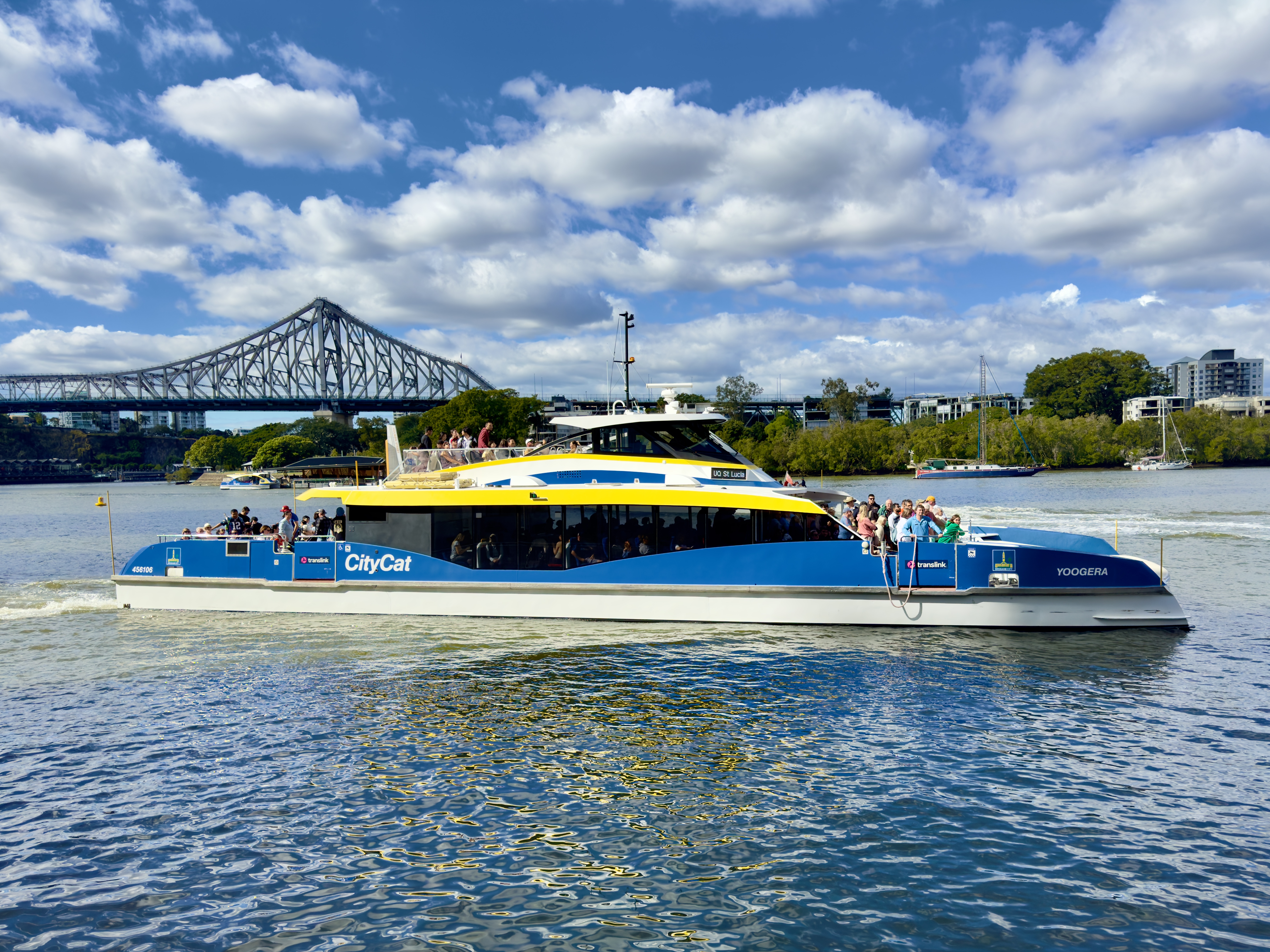
The Citycats are Brisbane's distinct maritime boat and often painted in the traditional city colour's blue and gold.

Historical gathering places include Musgrave Park (Kurilpa), Victoria Park (Barrambin), and the Kangaroo Point Cliffs, traditionally used for ceremonies, hunting, fishing, and social gatherings. Other important areas include the Nudgee Waterholes within Boondall Wetlands, historical campsites on the Southside, and locations along the Brisbane River that were used for fishing and trade.

The 'Kuril dhagun' at the State Library of Queensland provides a dedicated space for First Nations storytelling and cultural programming, while public artworks and educational projects engage residents and visitors with Indigenous narratives. The Mangrove Walk at Queen’s Wharf, designed in collaboration with the Turrbal and Jagera peoples, is a pedestrian boardwalk through riverfront mangroves featuring animal totems, interpretive signage, and sound installations that highlight the ecological and cultural significance of the area. The nearby Neville Bonner Bridge, spanning the Brisbane River, honours Australia’s first Indigenous senator, Neville Bonner.

== Landmarks ==
Brisbane is home to a number of landmarks of national importance.

- Brisbane City Hall is an iconic civic landmark featuring a 91 metre Clock Tower and the Museum of Brisbane (MoB). Completed in 1930, it remains one of Australia's most recognisable buildings and serves as a center for public events and cultural activities.
- Story Bridge is a heritage-listed steel cantilever bridge spanning the Brisbane River, connecting northern and southern suburbs. Opened in 1940, it is an iconic symbol of the city and popular for walking, cycling, and guided bridge climbs.
- Old Museum Building, formerly the Exhibition Hall for the Royal Queensland Show (Ekka), is a heritage-listed site now used for performances, exhibitions, and community events.
- Treasury Building is a heritage-listed neoclassical grand building located along the Brisbane River, prominently visible from South Bank.
- Kangaroo Point Bridge is a pedestrian and cyclist bridge linking the city to Kangaroo Point.
- Gallery of Modern Art (GOMA) is part of the Queensland Cultural Centre at South Bank. Opened in 2006, it is internationally recognized as a leading institution in the Asia-Pacific and is the largest modern art gallery in Australia.
- Queensland Performing Arts Centre (QPAC), also part of the South Bank Cultural Precinct, is an architectural and cultural landmark hosting theatre, opera, ballet, and music performances. It is the largest Performing Arts Centre in Australia.
- St John's Cathedral is a neo-Gothic Anglican cathedral located in the heart of Brisbane. Founded in 1901 by the Duke of Cornwall and York (later King George V), it is notable for being the only cathedral in the Southern Hemisphere with full stone vaulting.

== Arts ==
=== Architecture ===
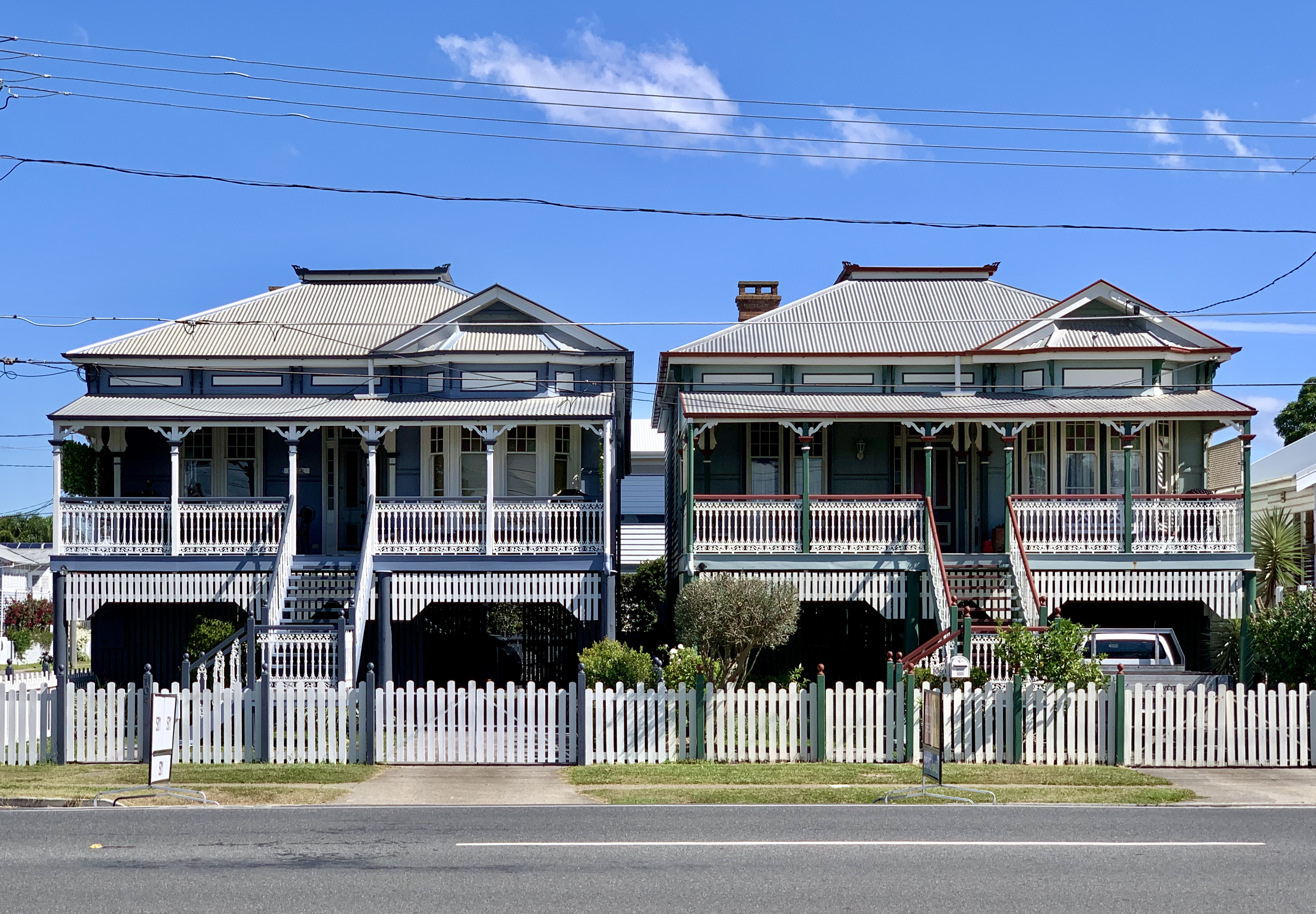
Queenslander houses in Sandgate, 2020

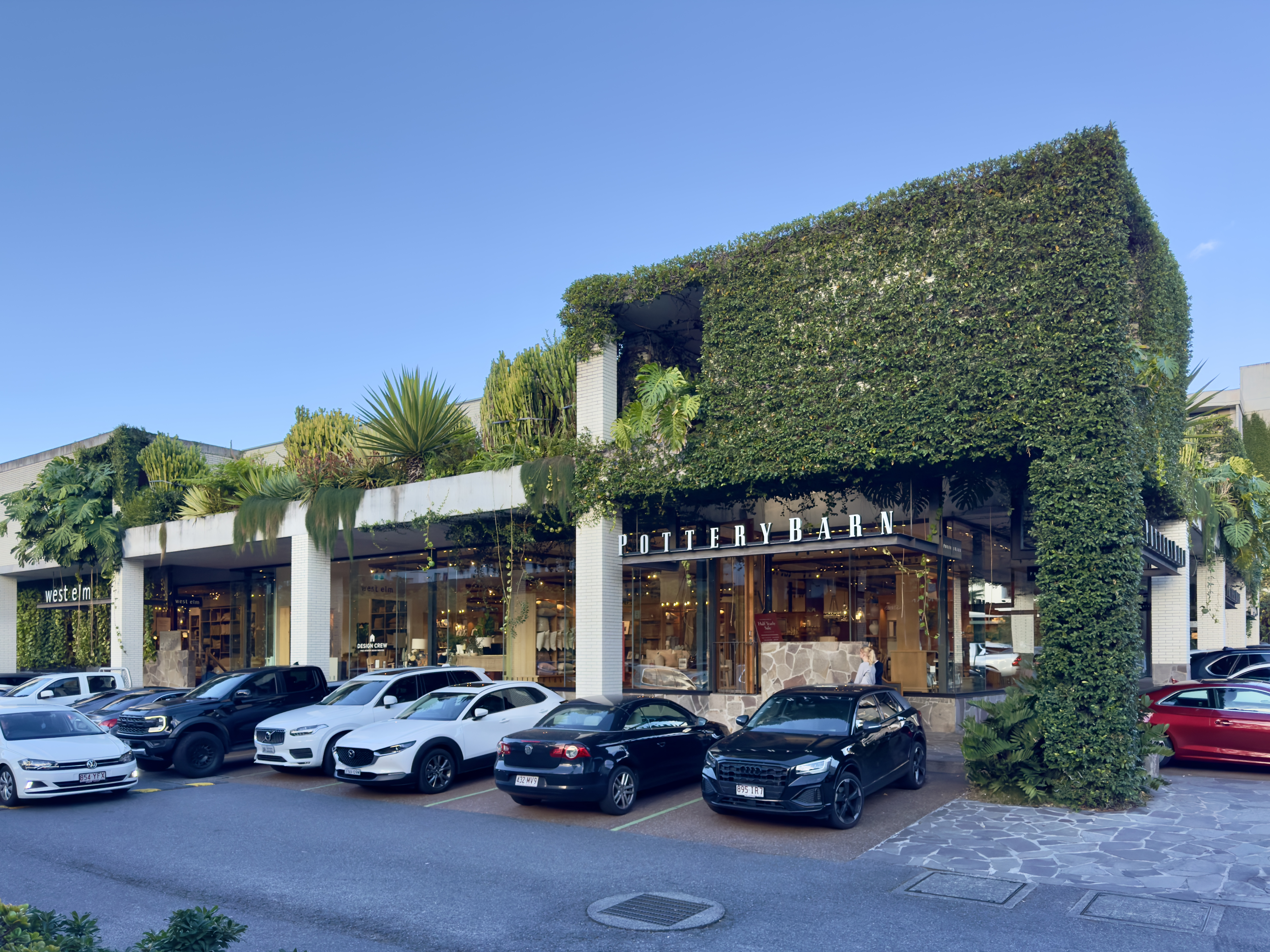
Contemporary urban design along James Street in Fortitude Valley, 2025

Architecture in Brisbane has been shaped by the city’s subtropical climate, historical development, and contemporary design innovation. The Queenslander, a timber house elevated on stumps with wide verandahs and high ceilings, is considered Australia's most iconic architectural style. Developed during the 19th century, Queenslanders were designed to maximise airflow while protecting homes from flooding, humidity, and pests. Many suburbs retain original examples, and the style continues to influence contemporary housing through modern adaptations that integrate traditional elements with sustainable design principles.

The city also contains many notable heritage buildings, prominent examples include the Old Windmill, Commissariat Store, Customs House, Old Government House, and St Stephen's Cathedral.

Several influential Australian architects have worked in or emerged from Brisbane, including Andrew Petrie, Francis Richard Hall, Francis Drummond Greville Stanley, George Gray Prentice, Thomas Ramsay Hall, Alfred Barton Brady, Thomas Pye, Robin Gibson, Karl Langer, Jeremy Edmiston, Christina Cho, Elina Mottram, and Gabriel Poole.

Academic interpretations of Brisbane’s architectural history have been shaped by scholars such as John P. Macarthur of the University of Queensland.

=== Aesthetic Design ===
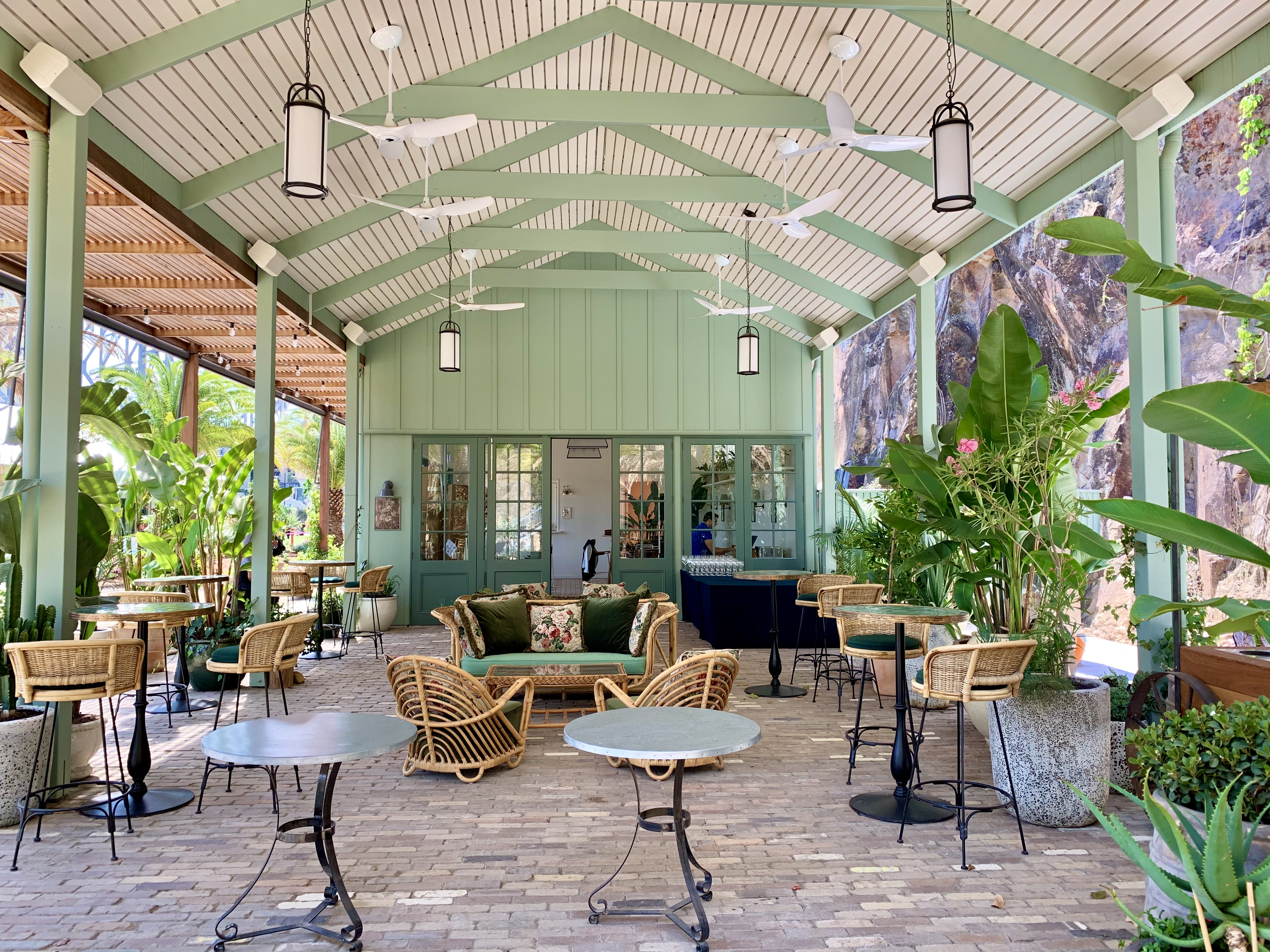
Green House at Howard Smith Wharves in 2019, is an example of Brisbane's subtropical modernism

The built environment of Brisbane reflects a distinctive aesthetic often described as subtropical modernism, characterised by climate-responsive design and the blurring of lines between indoor and outdoor spaces.

Architectural and interior designs frequently incorporate natural materials such as timber, stone including locally quarried Brisbane tuff, and integrated vegetation. Design elements often prioritise natural ventilation, shade, and daylight through features such as louvres, large bi-fold doors, expansive decks, rooftop gardens, and vertical planting.

Interiors and façades commonly use light, coastal-inspired palettes with soft neutrals, sandy tones, and timber finishes, reflecting the city’s subtropical landscape and lifestyle. Contemporary developments increasingly incorporate brighter colours and bold contrasts.

=== Visual Arts ===
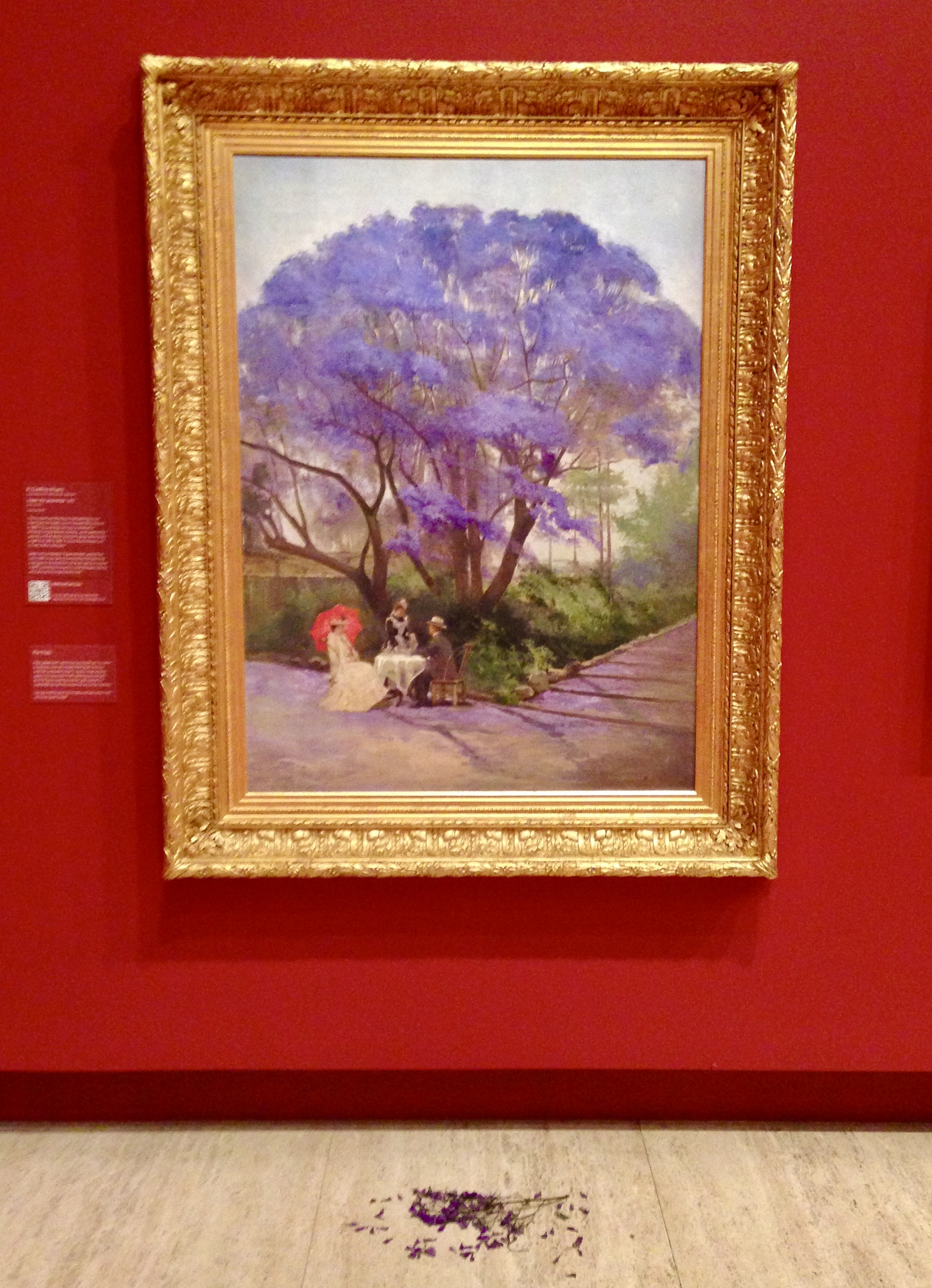
"Under the Jacaranda" by R Godfrey Rivers - Queensland Art Gallery - Joy of Museums

The city’s visual arts are supported by university galleries, including the University of Queensland Art Museum and the QUT Art Museum, and also exhibit contemporary and historical works.

Independent and artist-run initiatives also contribute strongly to Brisbane’s arts scene. The Institute of Modern Art (IMA), established in 1975 in Fortitude Valley, is one of Australia’s longest-running contemporary art spaces, presenting projects by local, national, and international artists. Other contemporary art venues and studios include 4000 Studios, an artist-run collective providing workspaces, exhibitions, and community programming for emerging and mid-career visual artists.

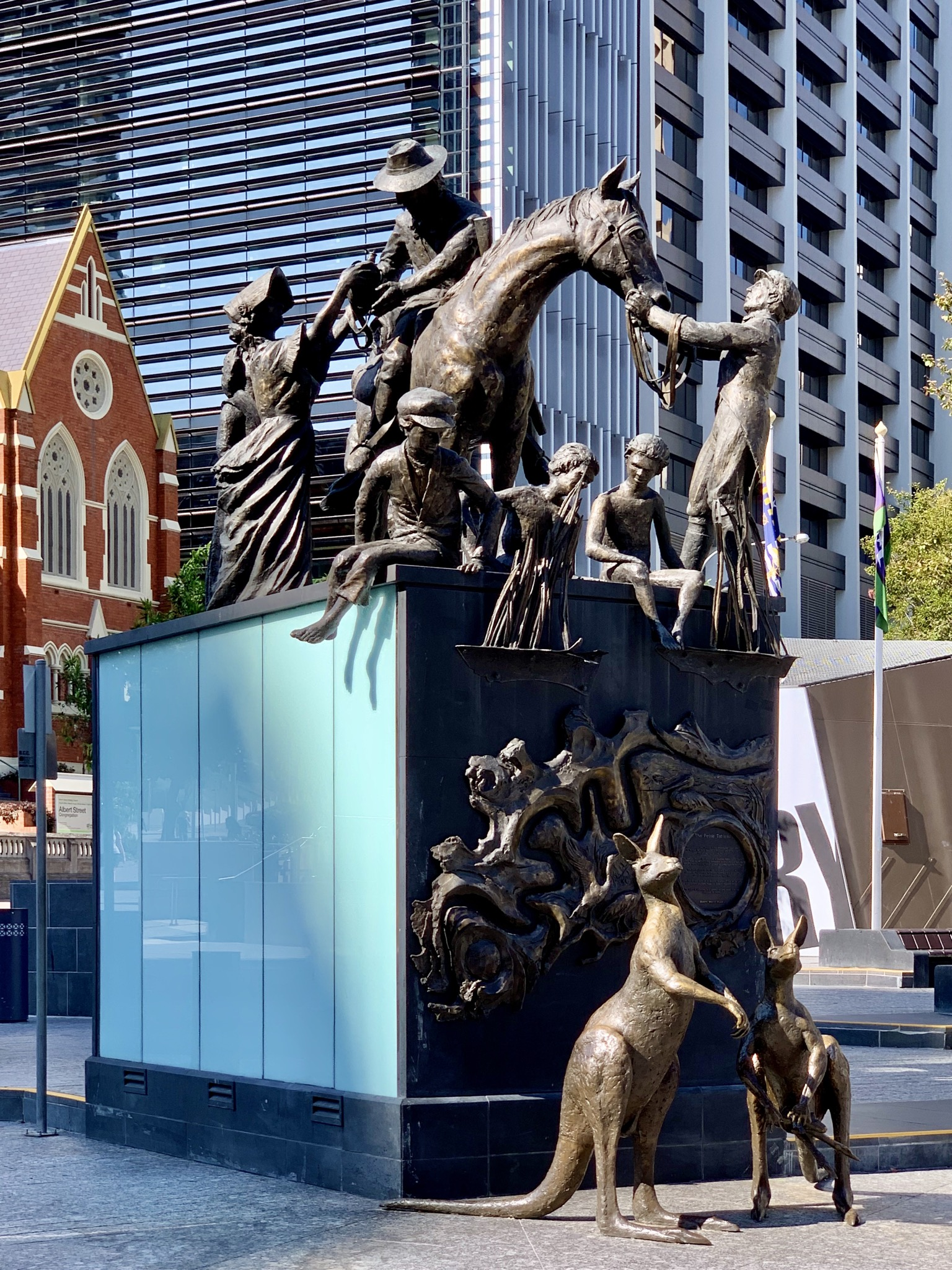
The Petrie Tableau monument in King George Square, 2020

Brisbane’s creative infrastructure also includes significant arts precincts, such as the Yeronga Paint Factory Arts Village, a repurposed industrial campus that offers artist studios, workshops, and exhibition spaces. The city hosts major art events, such as the Asia Pacific Triennial of Contemporary Art, held at the Gallery of Modern Art, and the annual Rotary Art Spectacular.

Historically, Brisbane played a central role in the development of Australian studio ceramics through the work of Lewis Jarvis Harvey (1871–1949). Harvey, who taught at Brisbane Technical College, established a distinctive style influenced by Renaissance and Arts and Crafts traditions while incorporating Australian motifs and local clays. The L. J. Harvey School of Ceramics became the largest school of art pottery in Australia.

Important artists associated with Brisbane include Elisabeth Cummings, Oscar Fristrom, Richard John Randall, Richard Godfrey Rivers, Olive Ashworth, Caroline Barker, and Edith Susan Boyd, while influential art critics have included Gertrude Langer.

=== Public Art ===
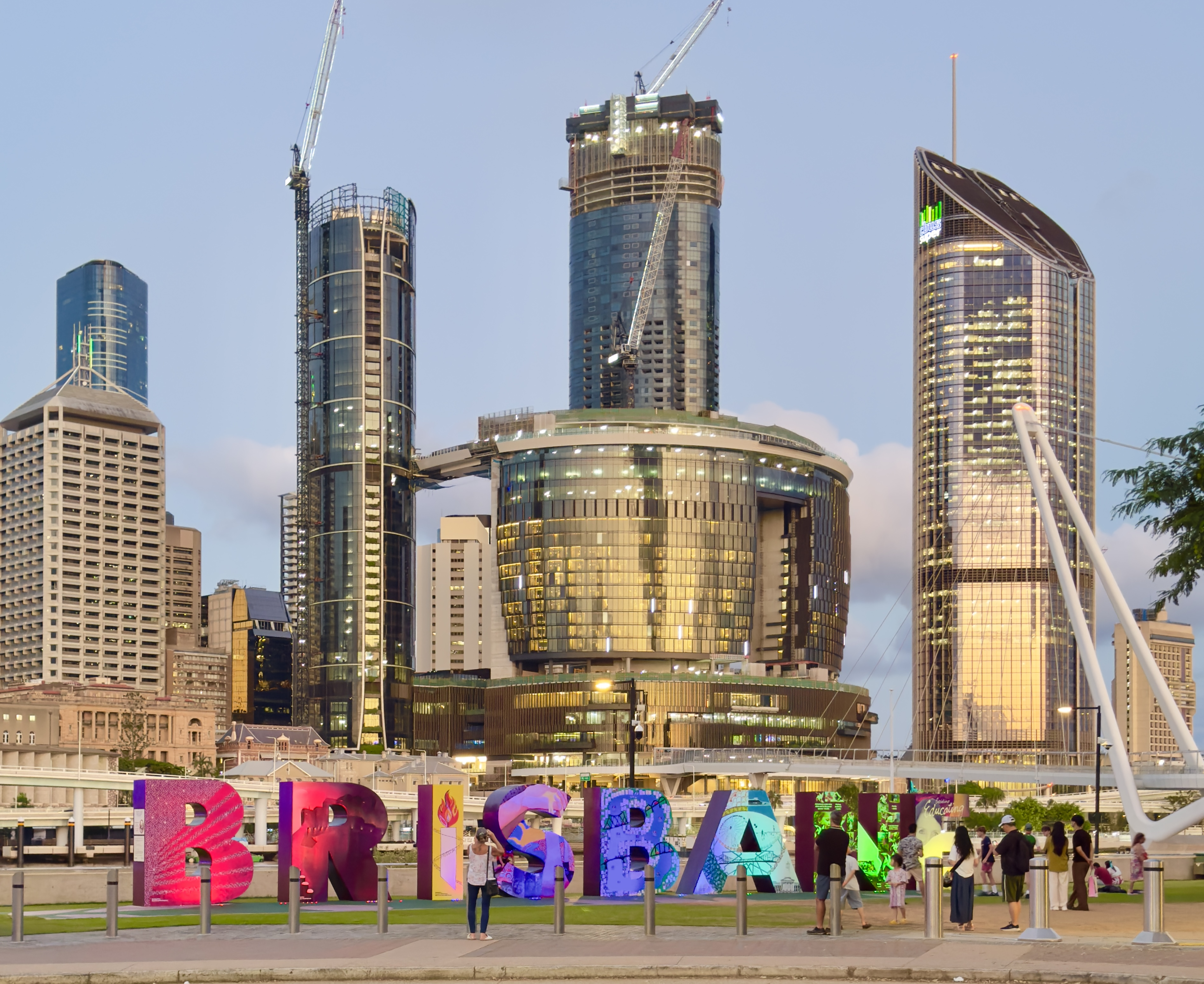
The Brisbane Sign in the South Bank Cultural Forecourt, 2024

Brisbane has a rich public art collection, ranging from civic monuments to contemporary sculptures. Key examples include statues of Queen Victoria in Queens Gardens, and King George V in King George Square, the Petrie Tableau, and numerous works in Anzac Square.

The sculpture City Roos by Christopher Trotter, created from scrap metal in 1999, is located near the former Law Courts Complex in George Street.

'Being Swallowed by the Milky Way' is a prominent bronze sculpture by Lindy Lee installed at the Queen’s Wharf Brisbane precinct, featuring thousands of small holes that create the effect of a glowing galaxy when illuminated. The Brisbane City Council Public Art Database provides detailed information about public artworks across the city.

=== Street Art and Laneways ===
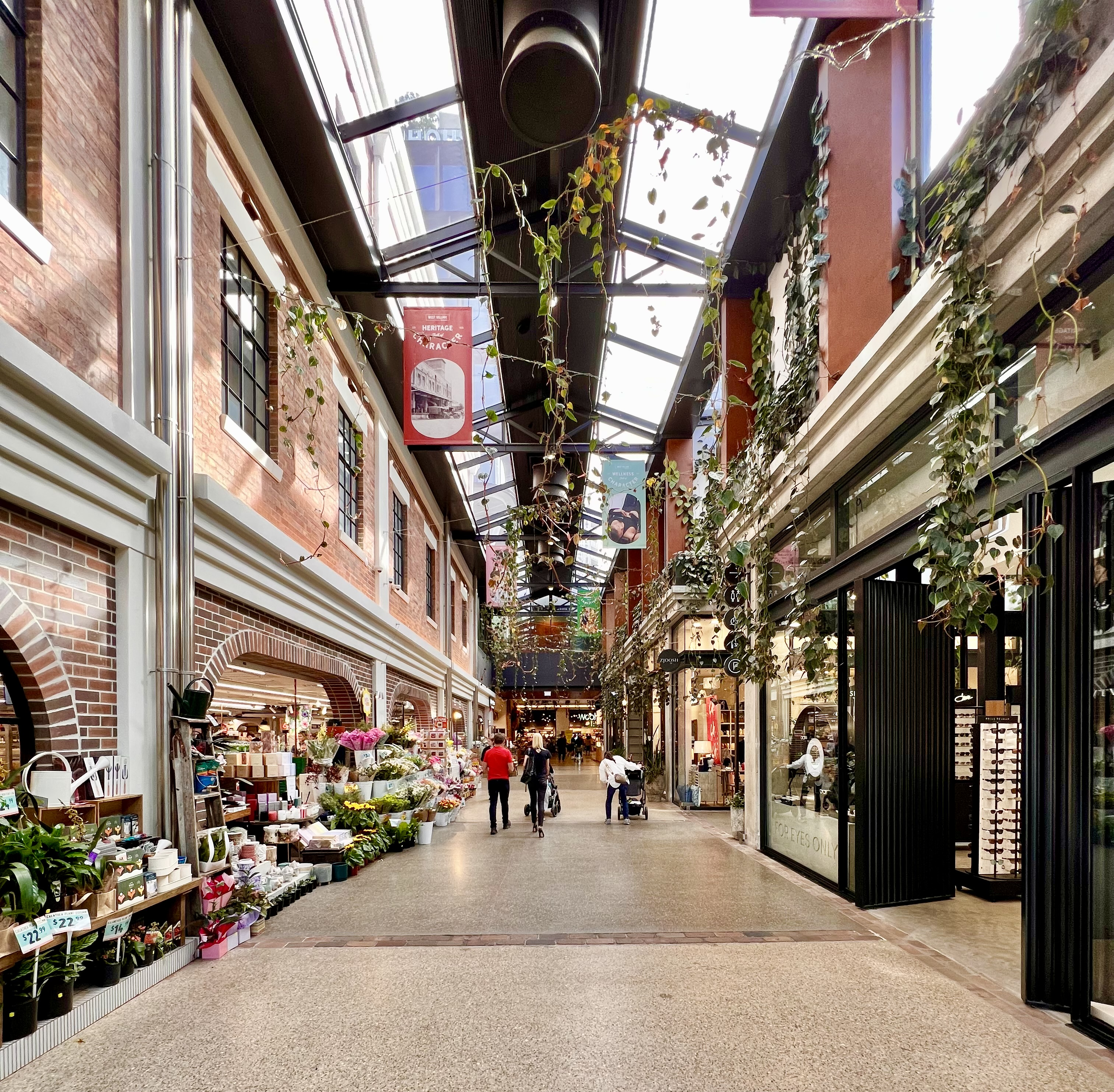
Peters Lane at West Village, in West End, 2023

Brisbane is recognised for its vibrant street art scene, which spans numerous laneways with distinctive artistic styles. Fish Lane in South Brisbane features a rotating “Outdoor Gallery,” the Pillars Project with massive murals on rail overpass pillars, and works by nationally and internationally recognised artists, including Fintan Magee. Burnett Lane, is Brisbane’s oldest laneway in the CBD, lined with historic buildings and art murals and displays, such as Mace Robertson’s tiny red door and Blu Art Xinja’s blue duck stencils. Other creative laneways include those in Fortitude Valley such as Winn lane, Bakery lane, and California lane, while Eagle Lane, Stephen's lane, and Gresham lane are located in the CBD.

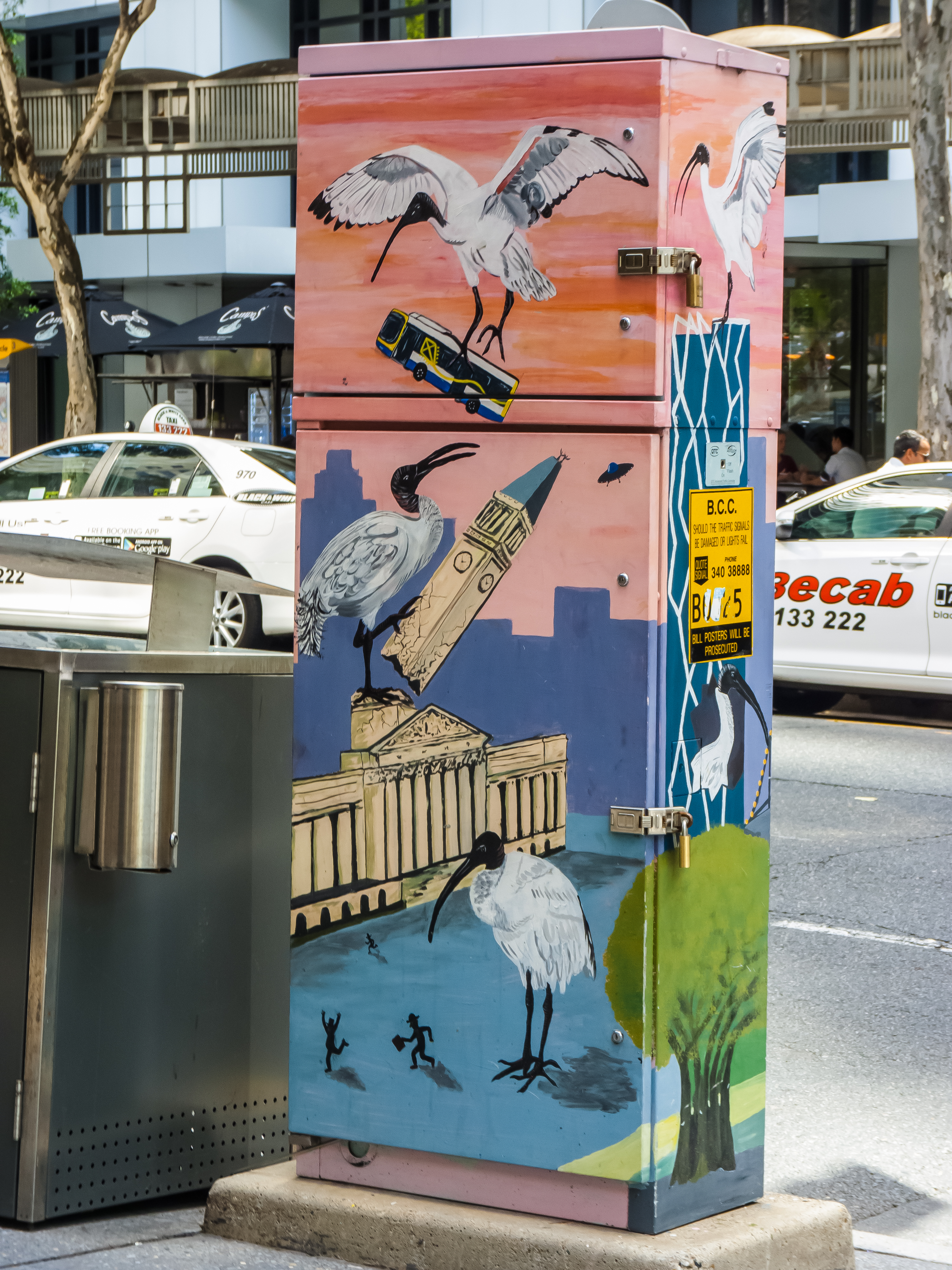
A painted traffic signal box of giant bin chickens destroying Brisbane City Hall, 2017

Brisbane also supports several public art trails, with multiple routes across the city that feature sculptures, murals, and installations celebrating heritage and contemporary art. These include the Art and the River Trail, Cultural Heritage Trail, World Expo ’88 Trail, and Contemporary Art and Architecture Trail.

The Brisbane Street Art Festival, established in 2016, has been a major driver of the city’s public art identity. It has transformed walls, laneways, and public spaces across Brisbane, including large murals and installations in neighbourhoods citywide, with a central hub historically located at Superordinary Northshore, Hamilton.

A particularly notable project is Artforce Brisbane, a world first initiative that has transformed traffic signal boxes into miniature murals since 1999. Originally launched as an anti graffiti strategy, the program has engaged thousands of volunteers and artists, resulting in hundreds of boxes painted across inner and outer suburbs, turning everyday infrastructure into accessible public art.

=== Opera and Theatre ===
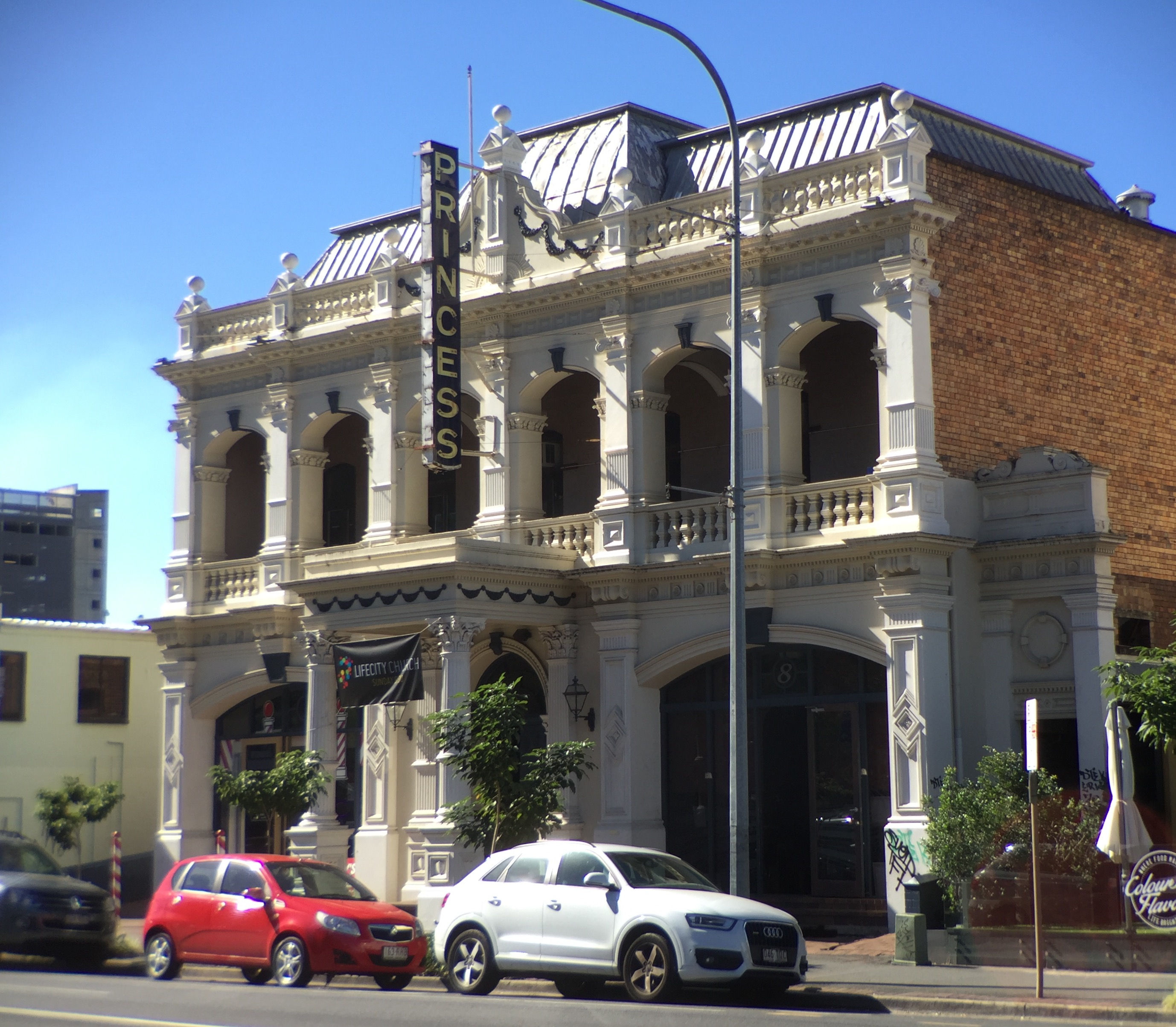
The Princess Theatre is among the oldest surviving theatres in Australia, 2016

The Queensland Performing Arts Centre (QPAC), Brisbane’s principal performing arts venue within the Queensland Cultural Centre at South Bank, houses the Lyric Theatre, Concert Hall, Cremorne Theatre, Playhouse, and the Glasshouse Theatre. With the opening of the Glasshouse Theatre in 2026, it became the largest performing arts centre in Australia under one roof. The venue hosts opera, ballet, theatre, orchestral music, and touring productions, with large-scale musicals frequently staged in the Lyric Theatre.

Professional performing arts organisations based in Brisbane include Queensland Theatre Company, La Boite Theatre Company, Opera Queensland, and Queensland Ballet, whose artistic directors have included Li Cunxin. Other companies active in the city’s performing arts sector include Australasian Dance Collective and Ballet Theatre of Queensland, Australia’s oldest continuous ballet company, founded in 1937 by Phyllis Danaher, the Queensland Pops Orchestra, The Queensland Orchestra, and Grin and Tonic Theatre Company.

Beyond QPAC, Brisbane hosts several other prominent theatre and performance venues, including Brisbane Arts Theatre, Twelfth Night Theatre, the Roundhouse Theatre, Metro Arts, the Judith Wright Arts Centre, Brisbane Powerhouse at New Farm, and the Princess Theatre in Woolloongabba. University-affiliated venues include the QUT Gardens Theatre and the Creative Industries Precinct at the Queensland University of Technology, as well as the Geoffrey Rush Drama Studio and the Schonell Theatre at the University of Queensland. Outdoor performance spaces such as the Roma Street Parkland Amphitheatre and Riverstage, along with the Northshore Brisbane precinct, host large-scale events and festivals throughout the year.

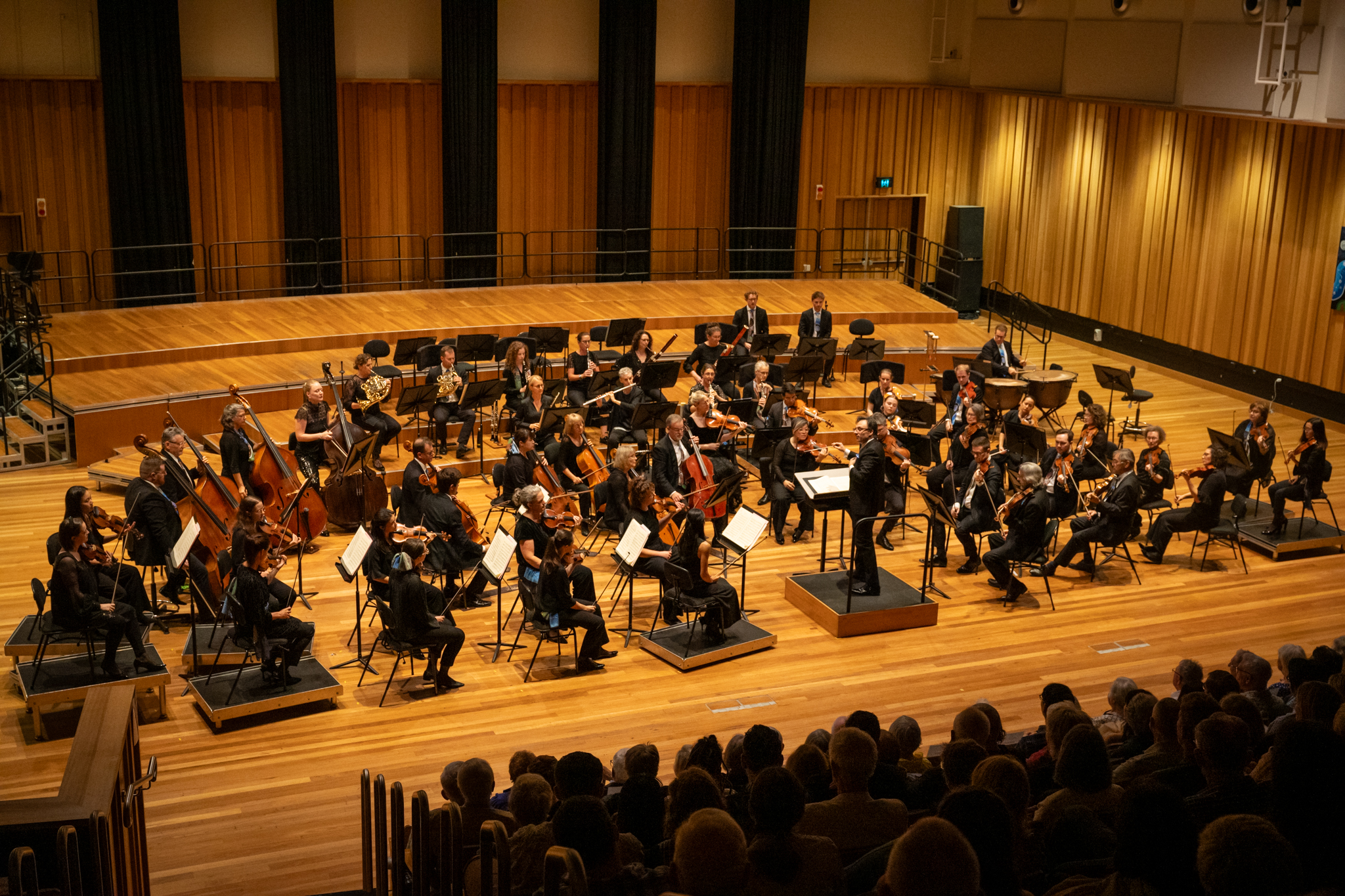
Queensland Symphony Orchestra performing at QSO Studios at South Bank, 2024

Many of Brisbane’s historic theatres have been demolished. Festival Hall closed in 2003, and Her Majesty's Theatre (opened 1888 and designed by Andrea Stombuco) was demolished in 1986 despite hosting performers such as Laurence Olivier, Vivien Leigh, Robert Helpmann, and Dame Nellie Melba. The Suncorp Theatre (originally the SGIO Theatre) and the interior of the Regent Theatre were also demolished, although elements of the Regent were later incorporated into a cinema redevelopment.

Brisbane is also home to institutions offering professional performing arts education. The Queensland University of Technology (QUT) provides courses in acting and theatre, while Griffith University’s Queensland Conservatorium and Queensland College of Art are located within the South Bank cultural precinct near major performance venues. Notable professionals who have taught in Brisbane include Rhoda Felgate, Babette Stephens, Joan Whalley, and Alan Edwards.

Beyond the professional sector, Brisbane maintains a vibrant community and amateur performing arts scene. Numerous choirs, orchestras, and ensembles operate throughout the city, including the Brisbane Chorale, Queensland Festival Chorus, Queensland Philharmonic Chorale, Exaudi Australis, Imogen Children’s Chorale, Brisbane Philharmonic Orchestra, Queensland Wind and Brass, Brisbane Municipal Concert Band, the St Lucia Orchestra, and South East Queensland Symphonic Winds. Community theatre groups such as Centenary Theatre Group, Villanova Players, Ignatians Musical Society, Queensland Musical Theatre, Savoyards Musical Comedy Society, and Springboard Theatre Company also contribute to the city’s performing arts culture.

The Brisbane Musical Theatre Competition, founded in 1997, promotes emerging musical theatre performers and showcases local talent. Local performing arts coverage is provided by several arts publications and review outlets, including Theatre Haus, Bravo Brisbane, Absolute Theatre, and Blue Curtains.

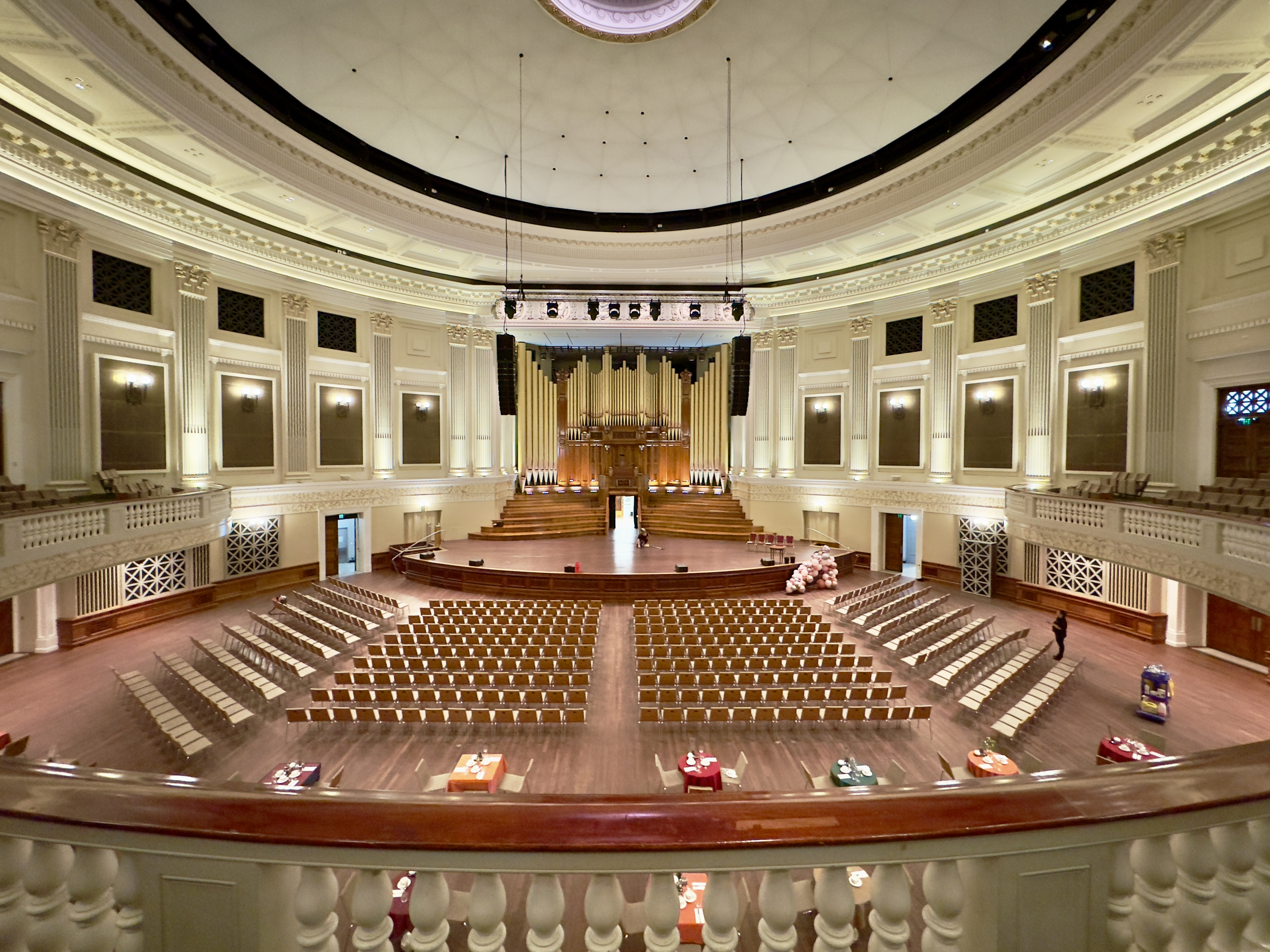
Brisbane City Hall

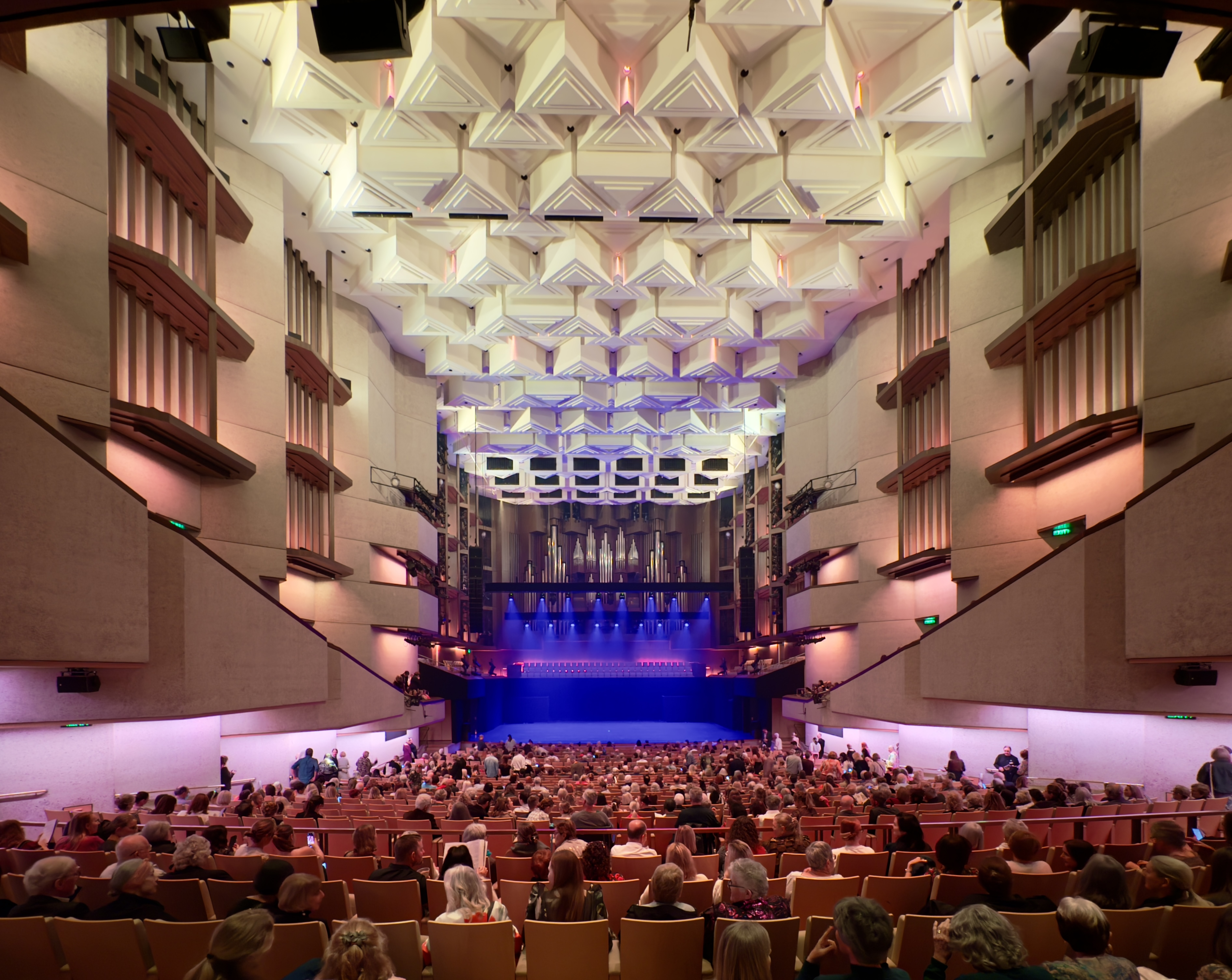
Queensland Performing Arts Centre

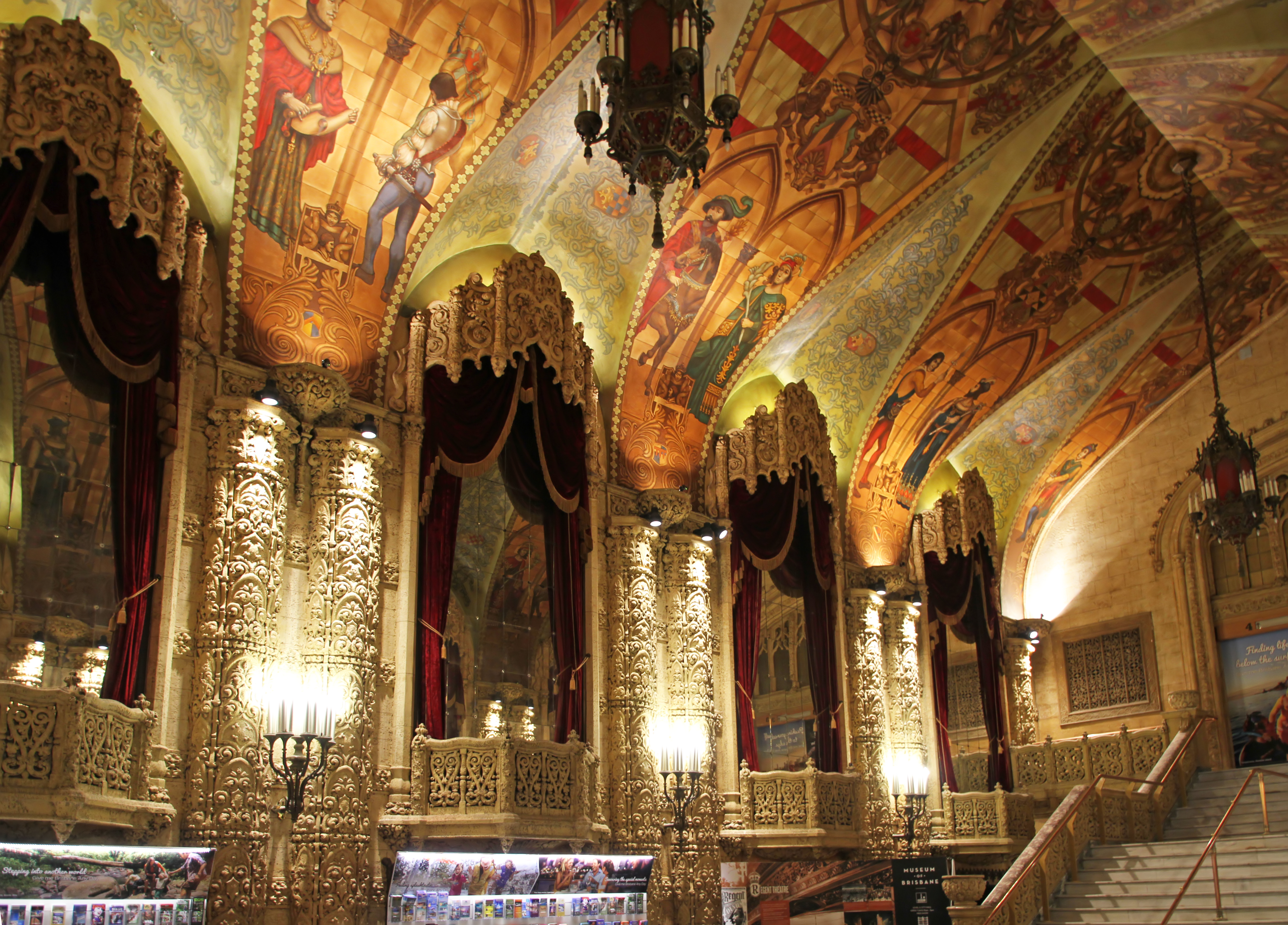
Regent Theatre

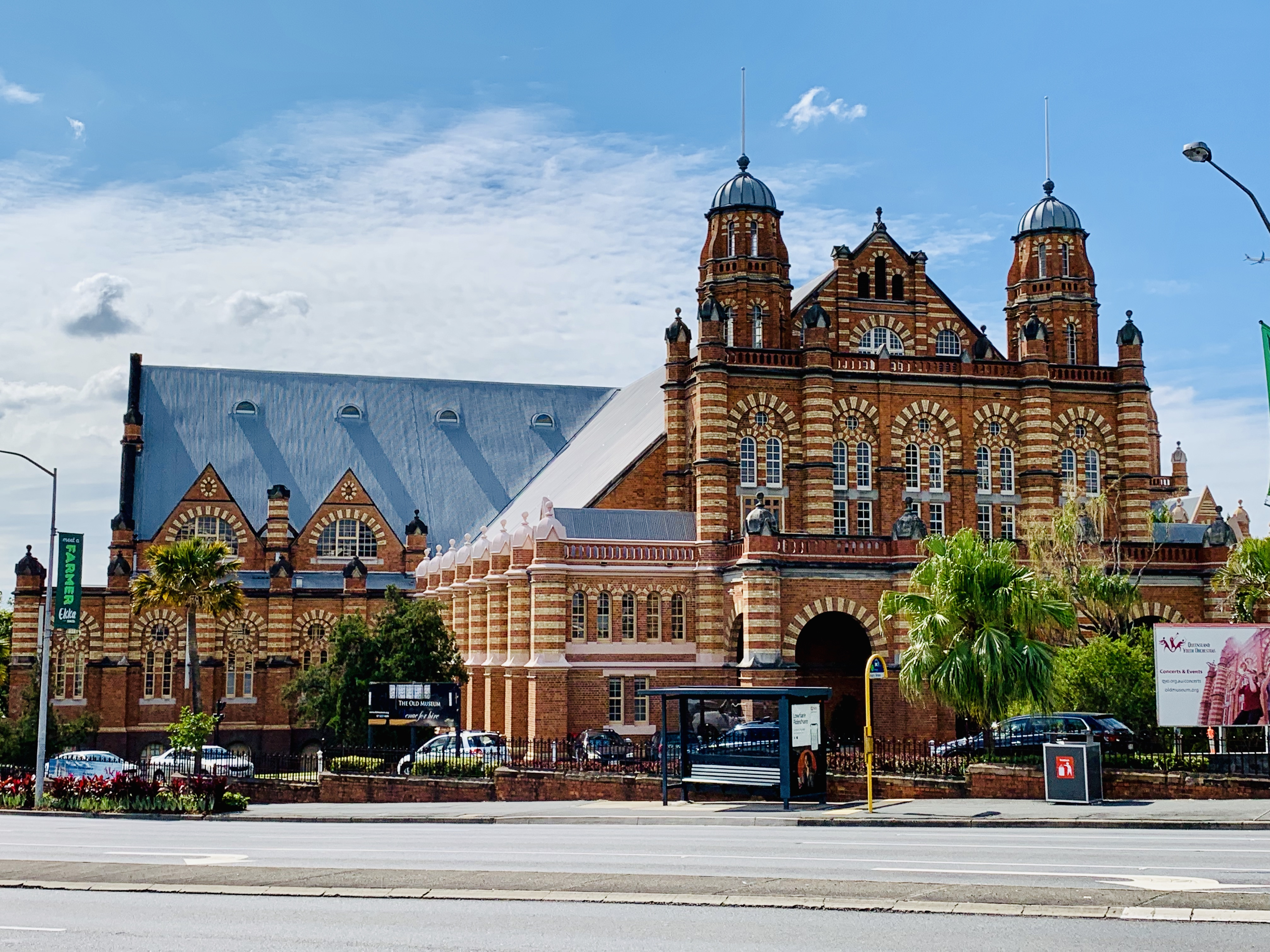
Old Museum Building

=== Music ===
Brisbane is one of the major centres of music in Australia and is known for its live music scene. The city has a strong tradition across multiple genres, including alternative and indie rock, punk, pop, soul, and contemporary R&B. Fortitude Valley serves as the city’s live music hub, with a concentration of clubs, bars, and small venues that have nurtured both underground and mainstream talent. In 2007, Billboard magazine recognised Brisbane as one of the top five contemporary music “hot spots” in the world, alongside Beijing, Birmingham, Marseille, and Berlin.

During the 1970s, Brisbane became a centre for the emerging Australian punk scene. The most influential band of this period was The Saints, whose 1976 single "(I'm) Stranded" is widely regarded as one of the first punk records released outside the United States and United Kingdom. Other notable bands included The Riptides, The Leftovers, and The Survivors, all of which contributed to a tightly-knit underground network of venues, house shows, and DIY recordings.

The development of Brisbane’s punk and independent music scenes occurred during the conservative premiership of Joh Bjelke-Petersen, a period characterised by restrictions on protest and strong policing of youth culture. During this period, Brisbane was sometimes referred to as “Pig City”, reflecting perceptions of heavy-handed policing and political conservatism. Some commentators have argued that this political environment contributed to the emergence of a distinctive underground music scene in the city.

Following the punk era, Brisbane developed a thriving indie pop scene during the late 1970s and 1980s. The Go-Betweens were the most prominent act, known for their melodic songwriting and literate lyrics. Other notable indie and post-punk bands included The Apartments. Local venues and community radio, particularly 4ZZZ, played an important role in promoting these bands and helping them gain national recognition.

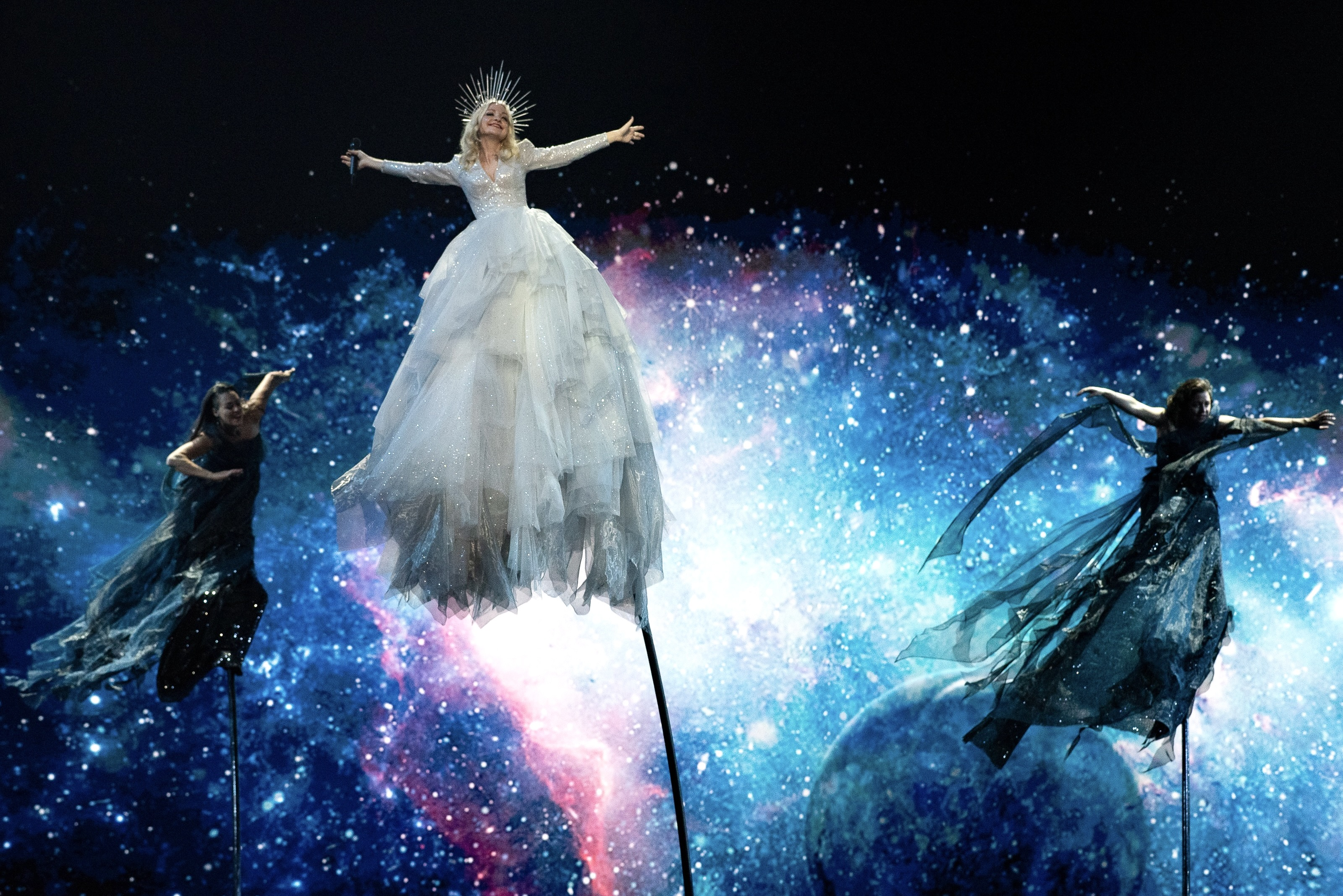
Kate Miller-Heidke during Eurovision 2019

Brisbane has produced several internationally and nationally successful musicians across a variety of genres. The Bee Gees were born in Brisbane before moving to the United Kingdom, where they achieved global fame in pop and disco music. Other prominent acts include Powderfinger, who gained recognition in the 1990s for their alternative rock sound, and Savage Garden, whose late-1990s hits brought Brisbane-born artists international chart success. Additional notable bands include Regurgitator and The Grates. Notable solo artists from Brisbane include Kate Miller-Heidke, Katie Noonan, Thelma Plum, and Dami Im.

Brisbane has a large number of live music venues and hosts major touring concerts and festivals. Major venues include the Brisbane Entertainment Centre, the Brisbane Convention & Exhibition Centre, and the Riverstage. Other large event locations include the Brisbane Exhibition Ground, Suncorp Stadium, and the Queensland Sport and Athletics Centre.

Fortitude Valley is at the centre of Brisbane’s live music scene, home to venues such as The Tivoli, The Fort, The Step Inn, The Empire Hotel, Black Bear Lodge, King Lear's Throne, The Brightside, The Press Club, and Fortitude Valley Music Hall.

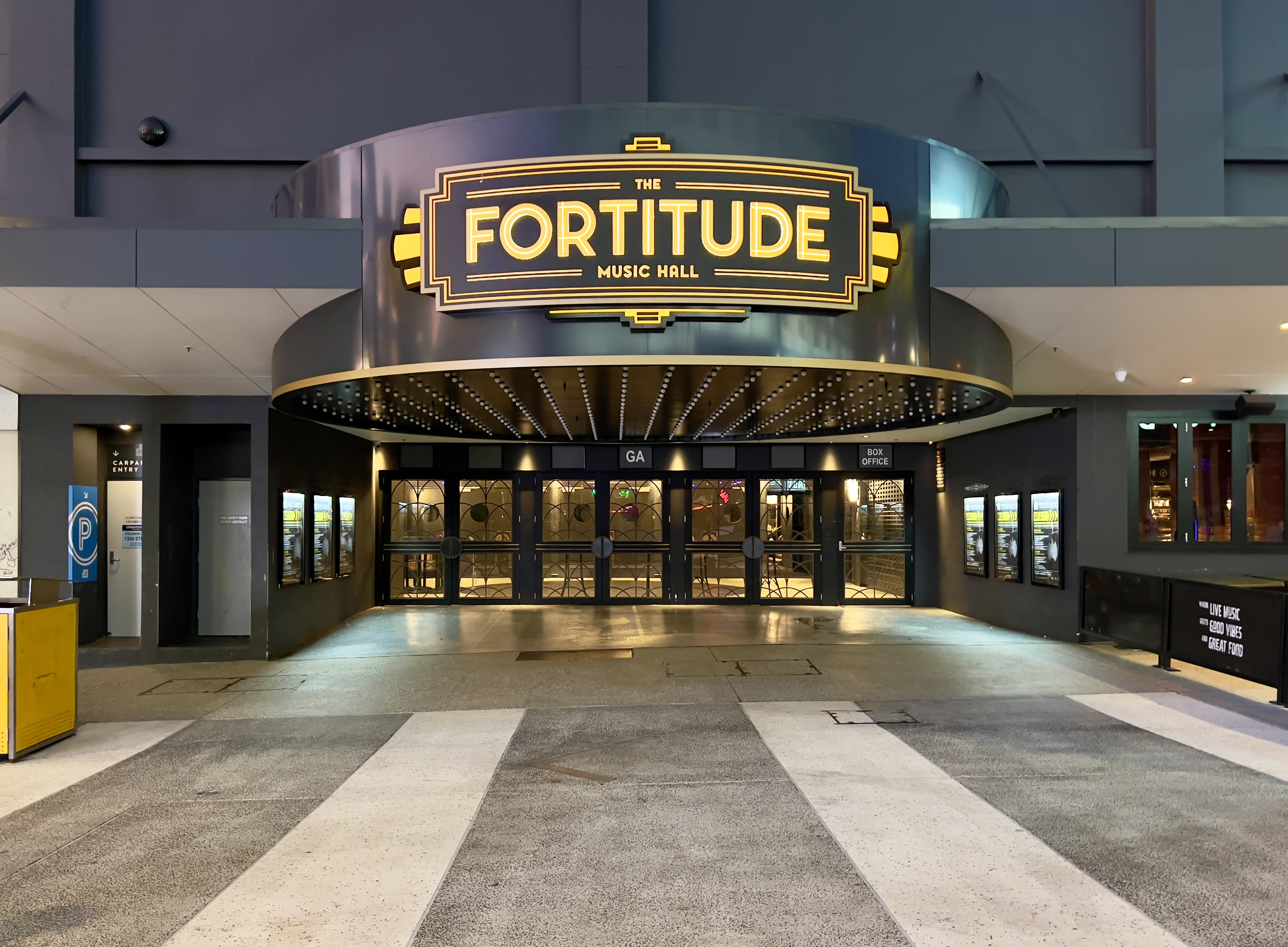
The Fortitude Music Hall is the largest ballroom/theatre-styled venue in Australia.

Historical venues include the now-closed Brisbane Festival Hall, which hosted major international tours including The Beatles in 1964, and Cloudland in Bowen Hills (demolished 1982).

Smaller venues such as The Crowbar, Ric’s, The Zoo, and The Alley Bar (closed 2008) have also been important for Brisbane’s underground and independent music scene.

Brisbane has been home to a number of national music festivals, including Future Music Festival, Jet Black Cat's Nine Lives Festival, Stereosonic, FOMO, Wildlands, Mountain Goat Valley Crawl, BIGSOUND, Soundwave, St Jerome's Laneway Festival, and Valley Fiesta. Livid ran annually from 1989 to 2003.

=== Museums and art galleries ===
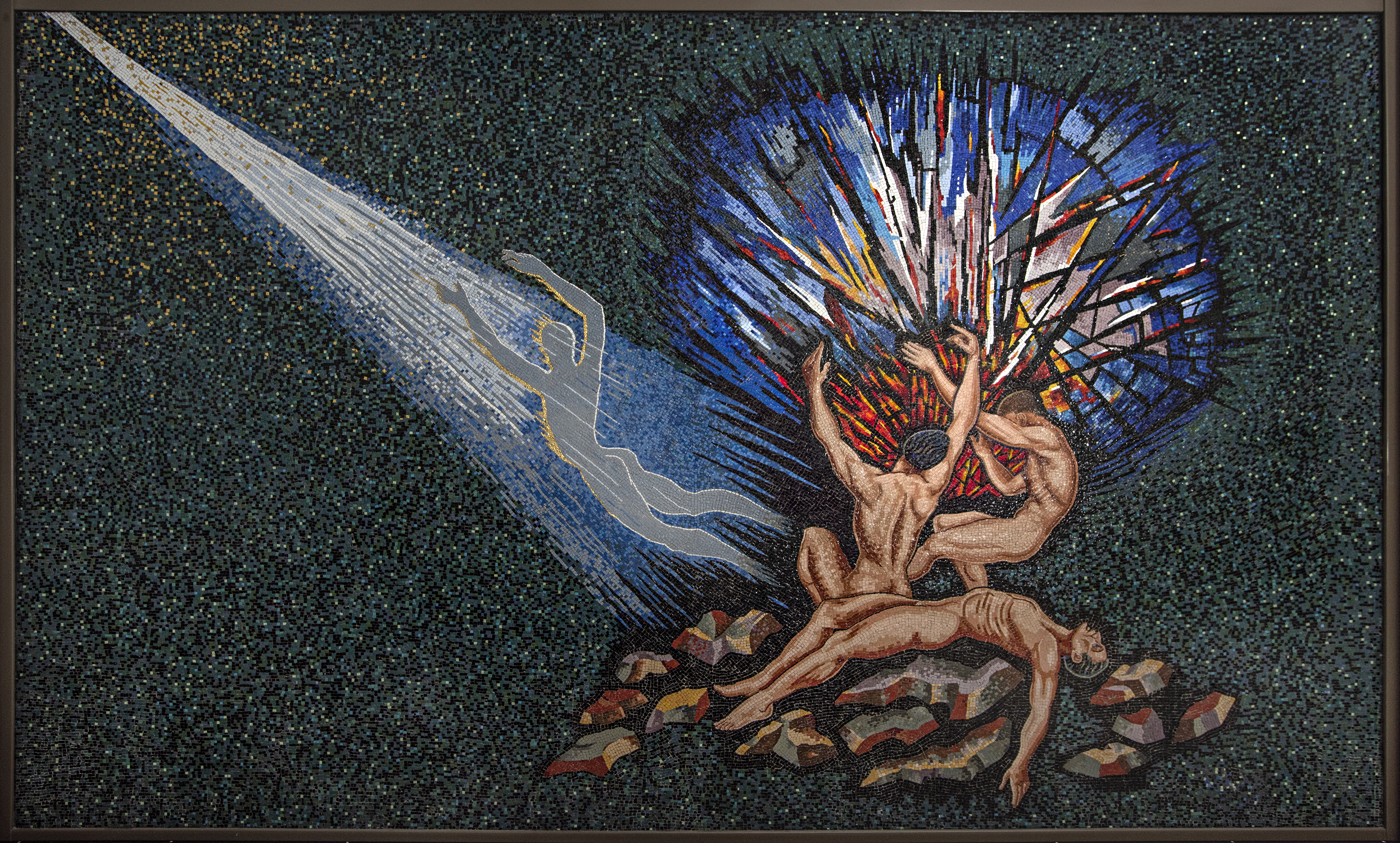
The Anzac Square mosaic mural by Don Ross, in the crypt beneath the Shrine of Remembrance

The Queensland Cultural Centre at South Bank serves as Brisbane’s main cultural precinct. It houses the Queensland Museum, the Queensland Art Gallery, the GOMA, the State Library of Queensland, and the Queensland Performing Arts Centre, the largest performing arts venue in Australia.

Other notable museums and galleries across Brisbane include:

- Museum of Brisbane (MoB), located on level 3 of Brisbane City Hall displays the city's history.
- Institute of Modern Art, (IMA) is a public art gallery located at the Judith Wright Arts Centre in the Brisbane inner-city suburb of Fortitude Valley.
- William Robinson Gallery at Old Government House, showcasing contemporary Australian painting.
- Commissariat Store Museum, focusing on the early history of Brisbane and Queensland.
- Anzac Square Memorial Galleries, including the Shrine of Remembrance and military history collections.
- MacArthur Museum, housing the World War II war office command of United States General Douglas MacArthur.
- Queensland Maritime Museum, maritime museum located within the South Bank cultural precinct.
- Abbey Museum of Art and Archaeology in Caboolture, specialising in antiquities and classical art.
- R. D. Milns Antiquities Museum at the University of Queensland, housing ancient artefacts of the classical civilisations of Greece, Rome, Egypt, and the Near East.
- Newstead House, historic manor that is Brisbane's oldest surviving residence and is located on the Breakfast Creek bank of the Brisbane River.
- St Helena Island National Park, national park that provides tours and reenactments of the ruins of the 19th-century prison island that is 21 kilometres (13 mi) east of Brisbane in Moreton Bay.
- Fort Lytton National Park, national park that provides tours and reenactments at the 19th-century Fort Lytton.

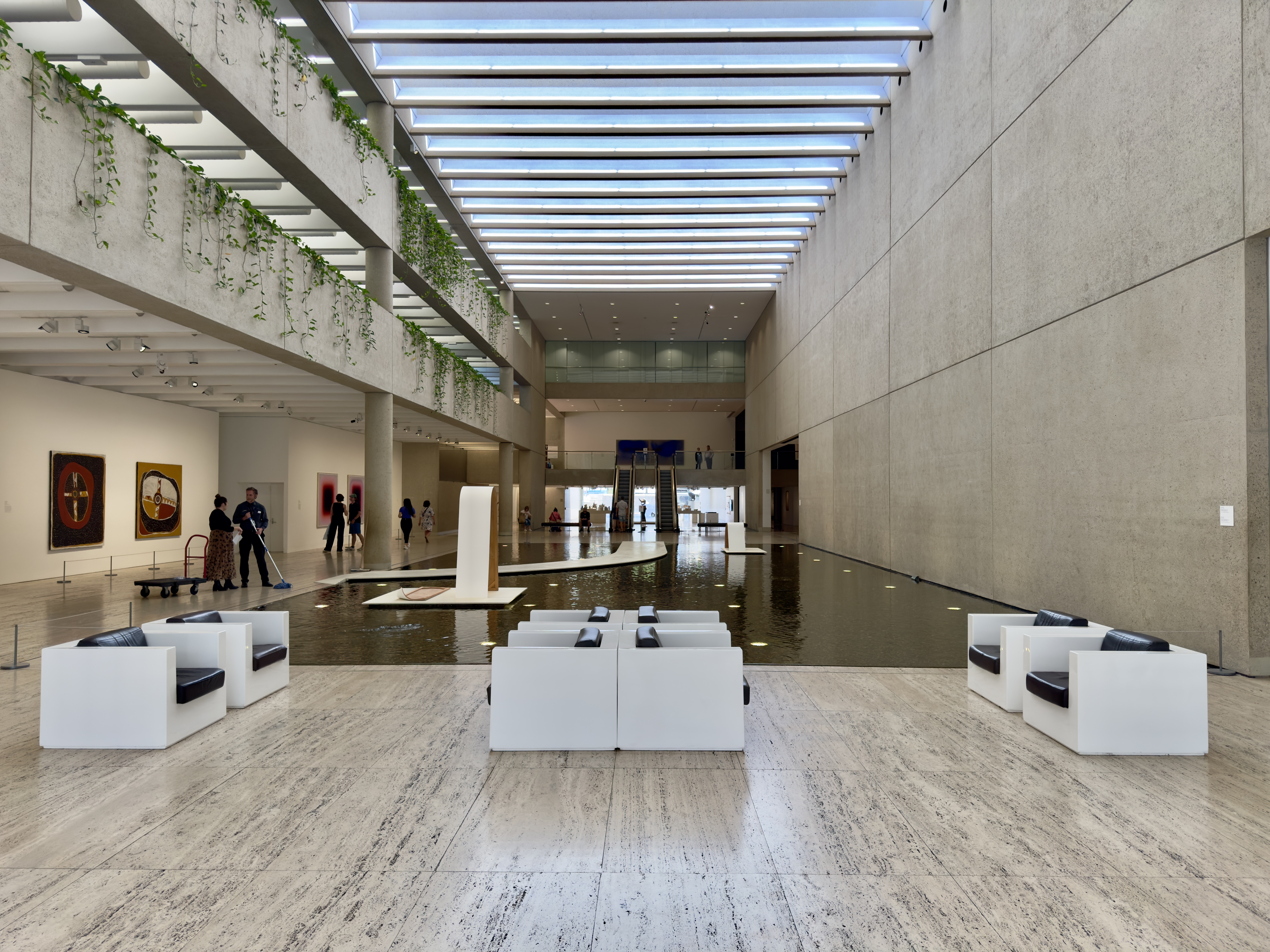
Queensland Art Gallery (QAG)

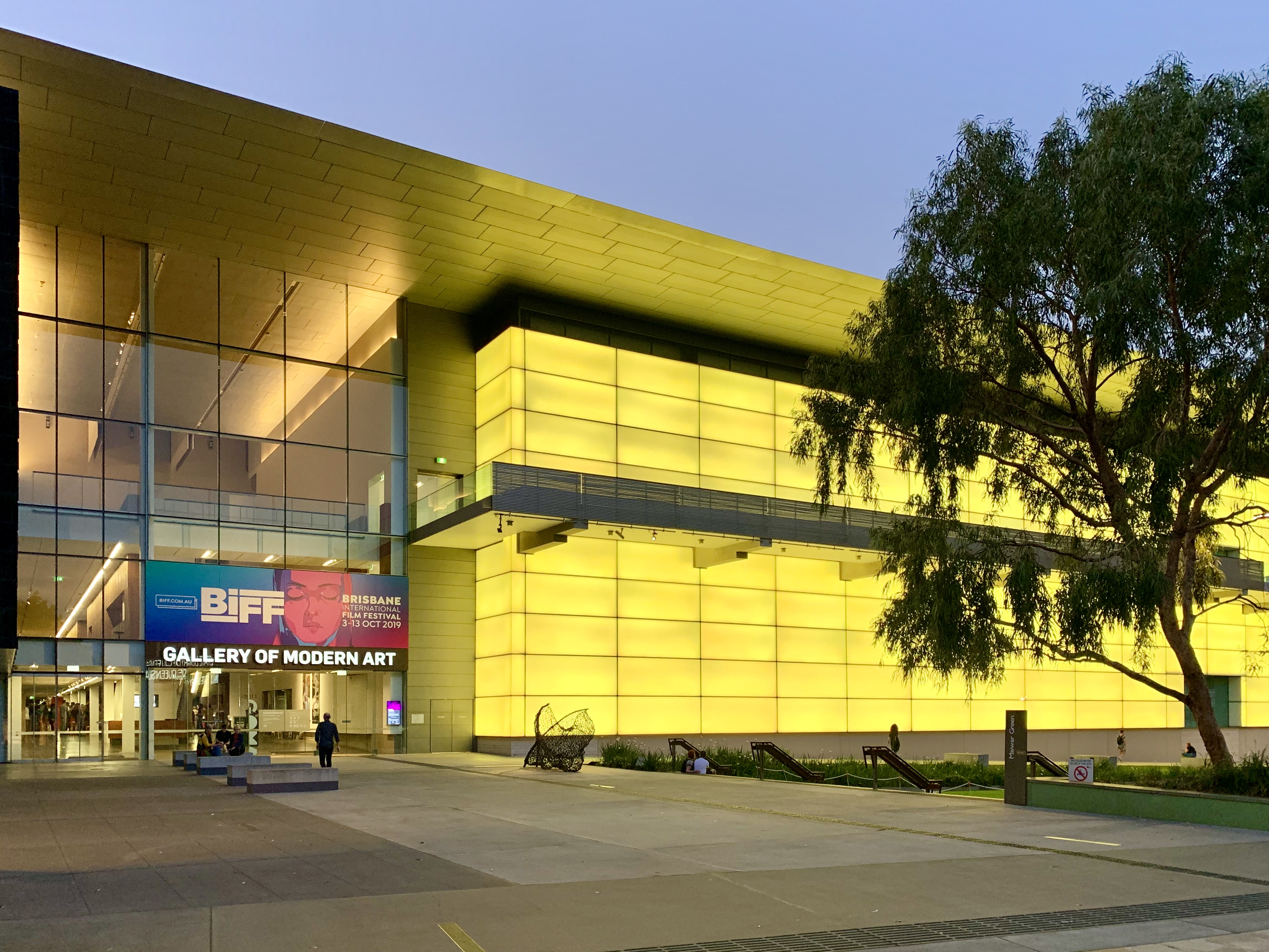
Gallery of Modern Art (GOMA)

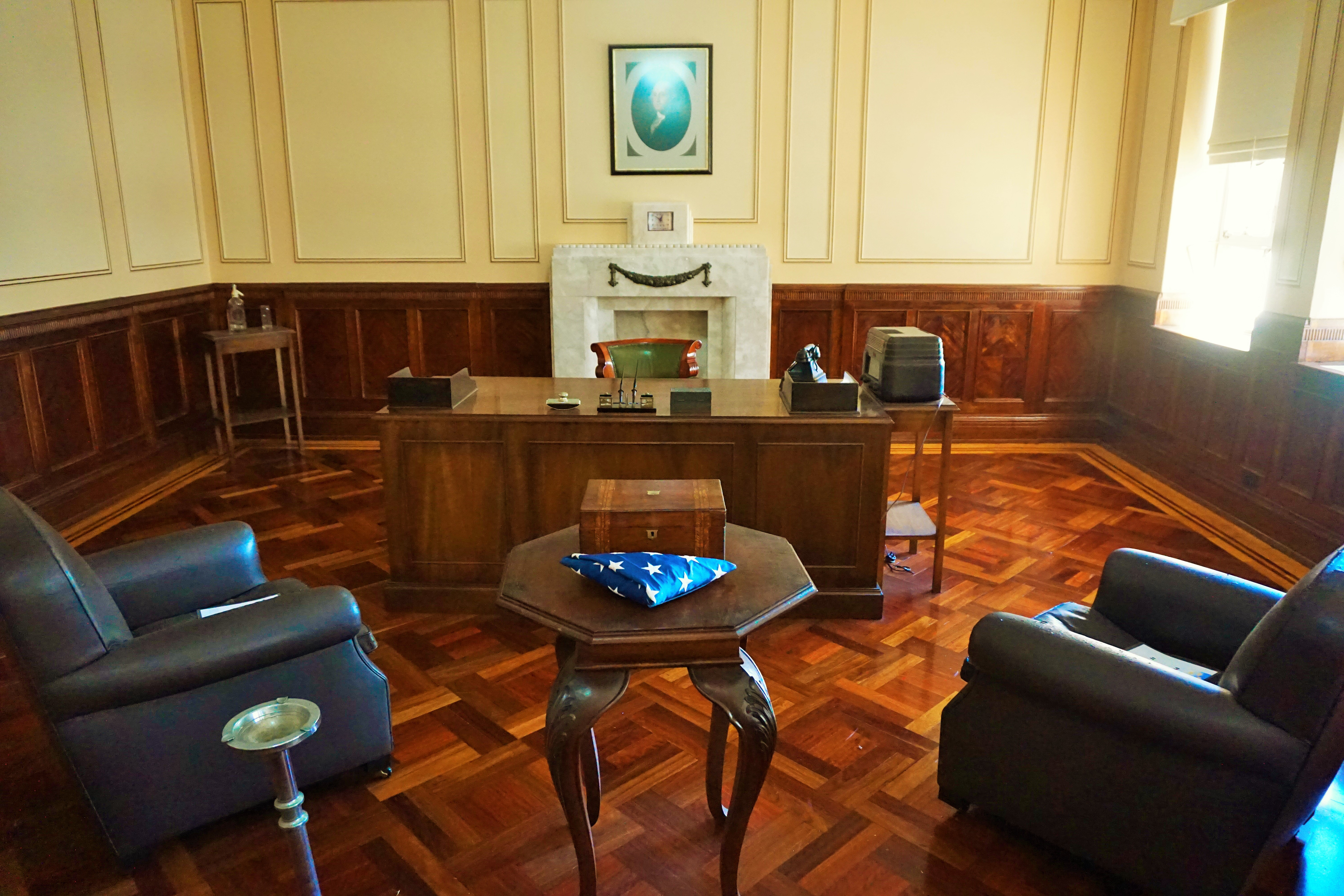
MacArthur Museum

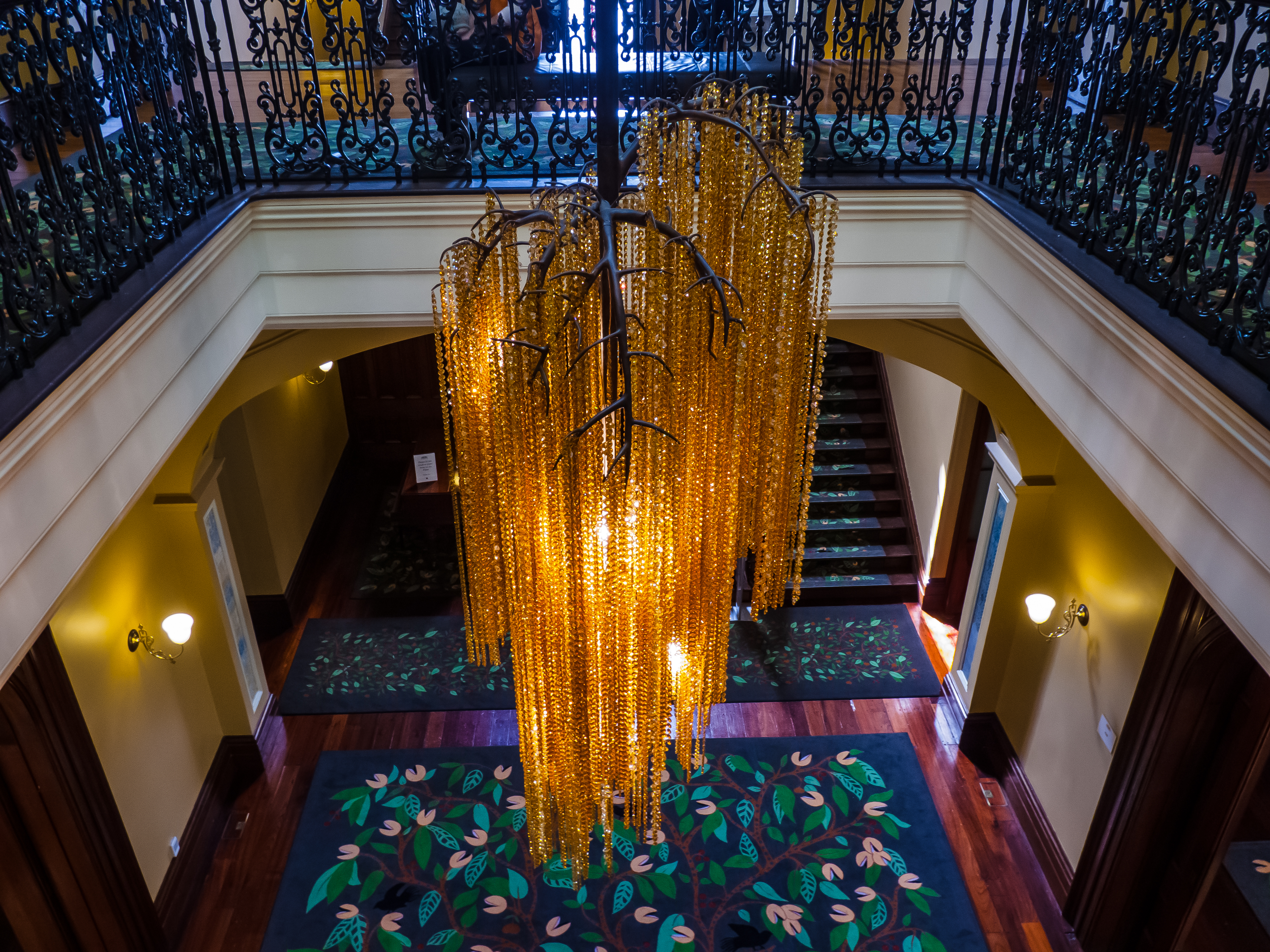
William Robinson Gallery

=== Libraries ===
The State Library of Queensland, located in the Queensland Cultural Centre at South Bank, is the principal research and reference library for the state. Established in 1896 and opened to the public in 1902, it collects and preserves material relating to Queensland’s history and culture and houses the John Oxley Library, a major research collection documenting the state’s development.

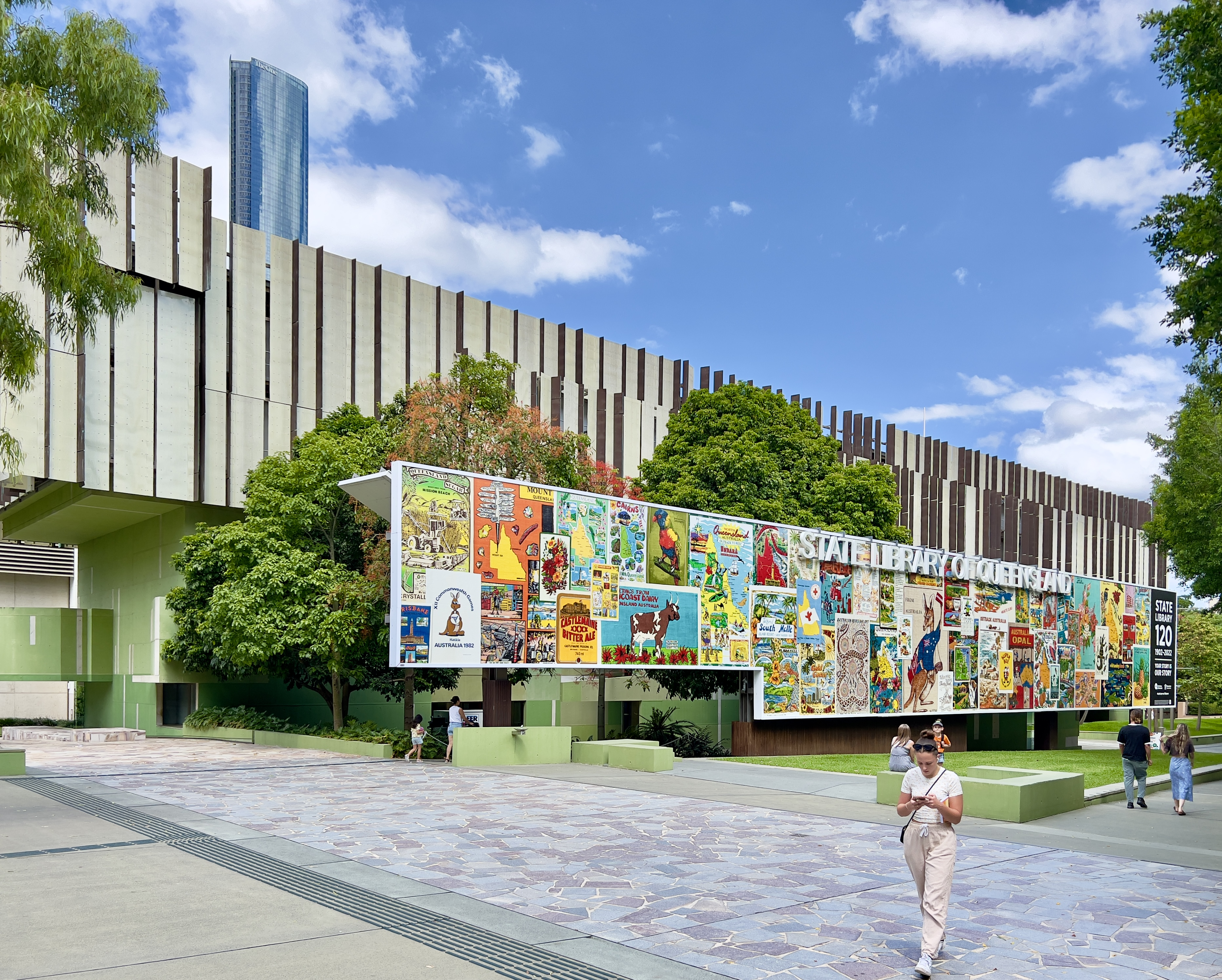
State Library of Queensland, 2023

Prior to its relocation to South Bank in 1988, the State Library was housed in the heritage-listed Old State Library Building on William Street in the CBD. Constructed between 1876 and 1879 and later extended in the 1950s, the building originally served as the Queensland Museum before being converted into the Public Library of Queensland in 1902.

Public library services across the city are provided by the Brisbane City Council through the Brisbane City Council Library Network, which operates more than 30 branches offering books, digital collections, and community programs. Notable branches include the Brisbane Square Library in the CBD, and the Kurilpa Library.

In addition to public libraries, major universities in Brisbane, including the University of Queensland, Queensland University of Technology, and Griffith University, maintain extensive academic libraries.

=== Film and television ===
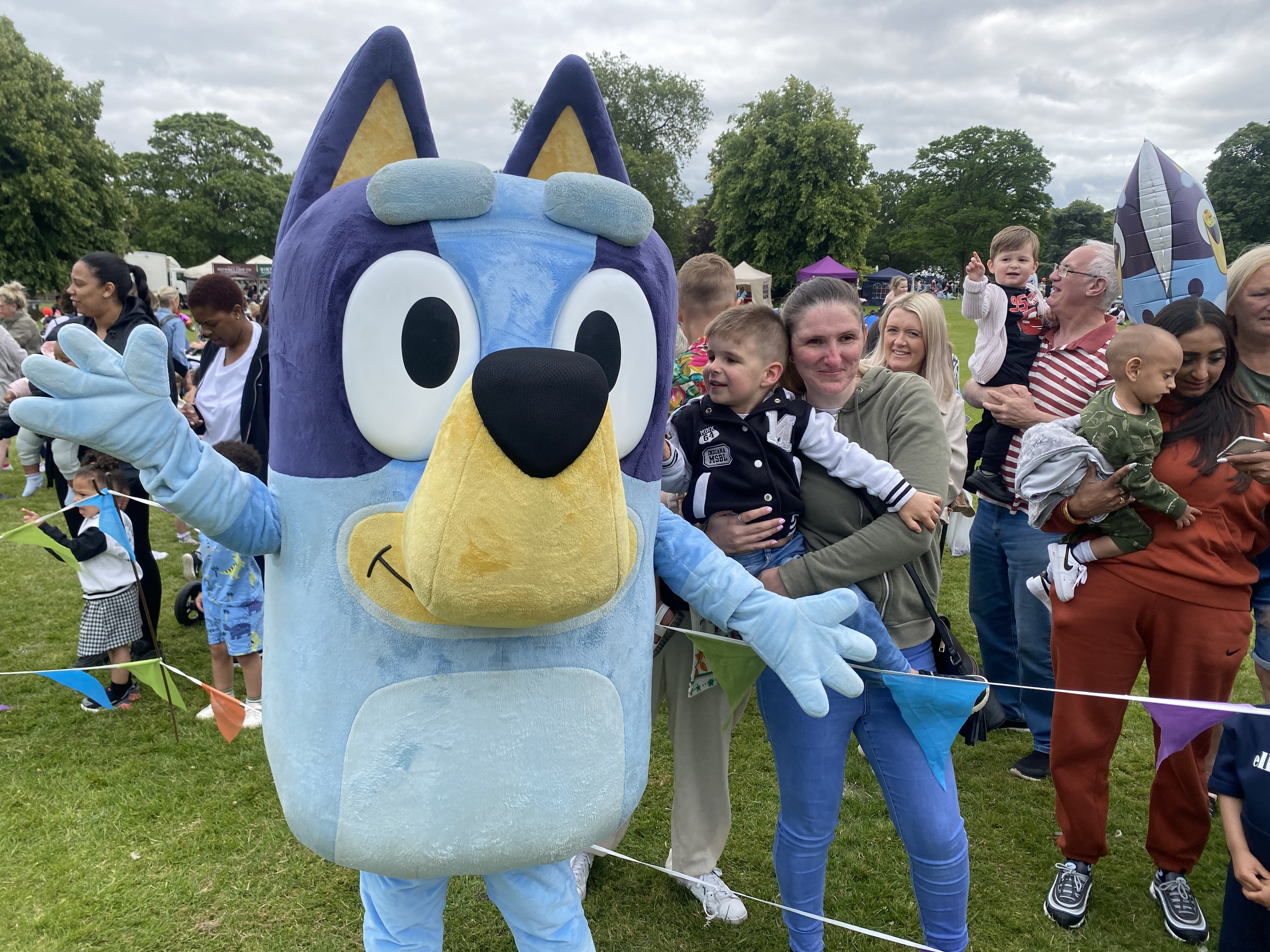
Bluey at a children's festival in Dudley, England, 2024. The show has become Australia's most successful cultural export, and is a global icon of Brisbane culture.

Brisbane has an active film and television industry, supported by institutions such as the Australian Cinematheque at the Gallery of Modern Art, which screens classic, international, and independent films with accompanying talks and discussions. The city has also served as a location for Australian film and television productions, with both urban and natural settings attracting feature films, shorts, and television series. The city’s main film festival is the Brisbane International Film Festival (BIFF).

The animated children’s series Bluey is produced in Brisbane by Ludo Studio and is set in the city, featuring Brisbane landmarks such as the Story Bridge, CityCat ferries, South Bank, and traditional Queenslander houses in its background art.

Many actors originate from Brisbane, including Lou Vernon, Ray Barrett, John McCallum, Leonard Teale, Anne-Louise Lambert, Michael Caton, Miranda Otto, Jamie Dunn, Jacob Elordi, Jonathan Hyde, Jang Han-byul, Geoffrey Rush, and Alyssa Sutherland.

=== Literature ===
Brisbane has a rich literary tradition and has been home to many notable Australian writers across multiple genres. The city has produced acclaimed novelists, poets, essayists, and playwrights, including David Malouf, Thea Astley, Nick Earls, Alex Miller, and Trent Dalton as well as writers and critics such as Humphrey McQueen and Charles Osborne, who were either born in Brisbane or spent significant parts of their careers in the city.

The Queensland Writers Centre, based at the State Library of Queensland, provides mentoring, workshops, and networking opportunities for emerging and established authors. The city also hosts the annual Brisbane Writers Festival, a major event attracting national and international authors. Independent bookstores, writing collectives, and community libraries play an important role in nurturing local talent.

Brisbane has also been a hub for literary publishing, with small presses and journals contributing to the city’s literary culture. The city is the birthplace of Meanjin, one of Australia’s most important cultural and literary publications.

Brisbane has been home to some of Australia’s most significant poets, including Judith Wright, Oodgeroo Noonuccal, Gwen Harwood, and James Brunton Stephens.

=== Fashion ===
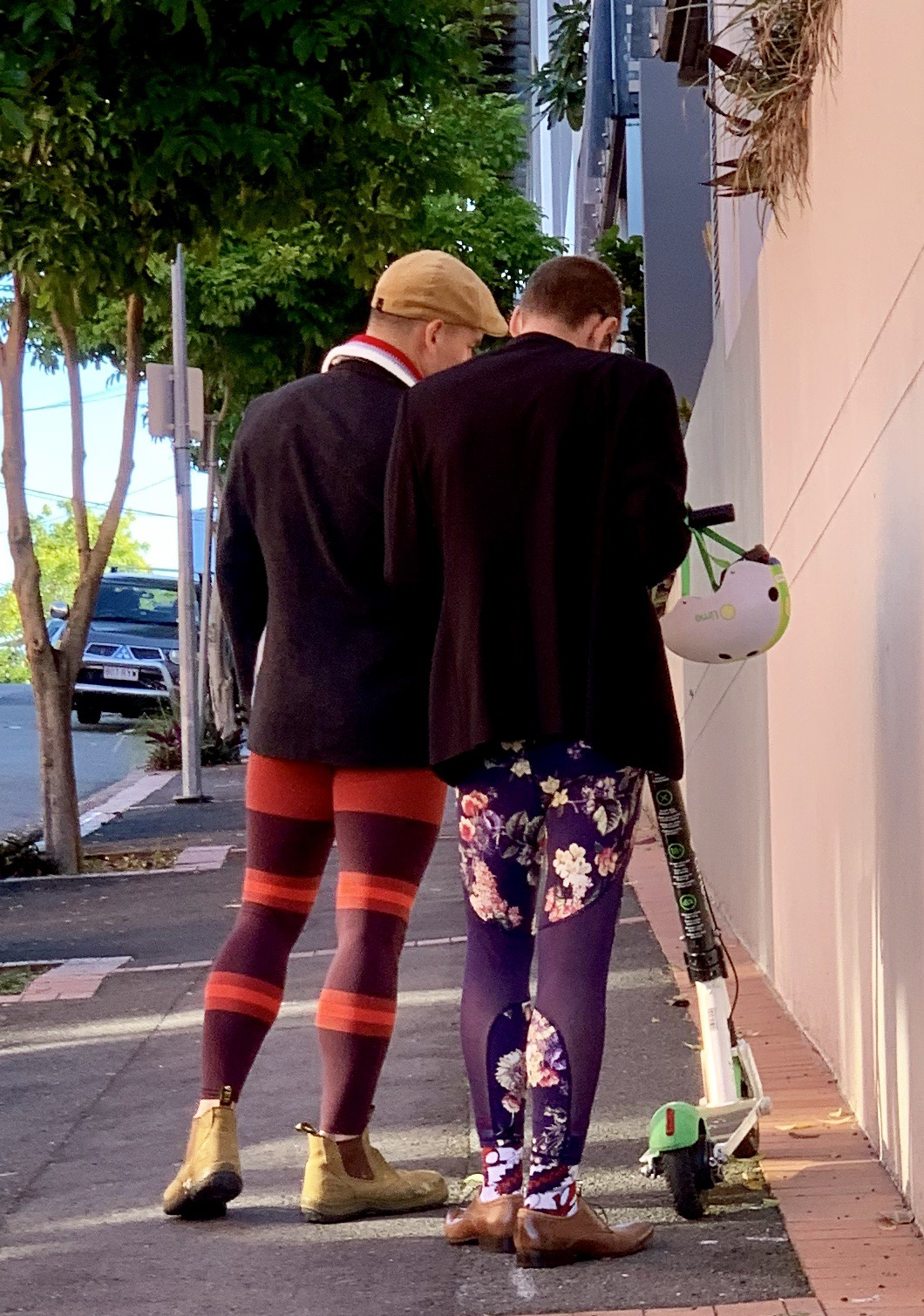
Street male fashion in Brisbane, 2019

Brisbane's fashion culture reflects the city's subtropical climate and outdoor lifestyle and is often described as a relaxed and vibrant form of “casual chic”. Compared with the more formal fashion cultures of Sydney and Melbourne, Brisbane style typically favours lighter fabrics, bold colours, and relaxed forms suited to warm weather. Linen, cotton, and other breathable materials are common, while bright prints and vibrant patterns are frequently associated with the city's fashion identity.

The city hosts the annual Mercedes-Benz Fashion Festival Brisbane, which showcases local, national, and international designers and serves as a major platform for Queensland's fashion industry. Brisbane has also produced notable fashion designers and labels, including Easton Pearson, Gail Sorronda, and Sass & Bide.

Key retail precincts reflect different aspects of the city's fashion culture. Edward Street in the central business district functions as the city's international luxury fashion strip, hosting flagship boutiques of global designer brands. James Street is widely recognised as a hub for contemporary Australian fashion and independent designers, while the historic Brisbane Arcade is known for bespoke tailoring, couture, and jewellery design.

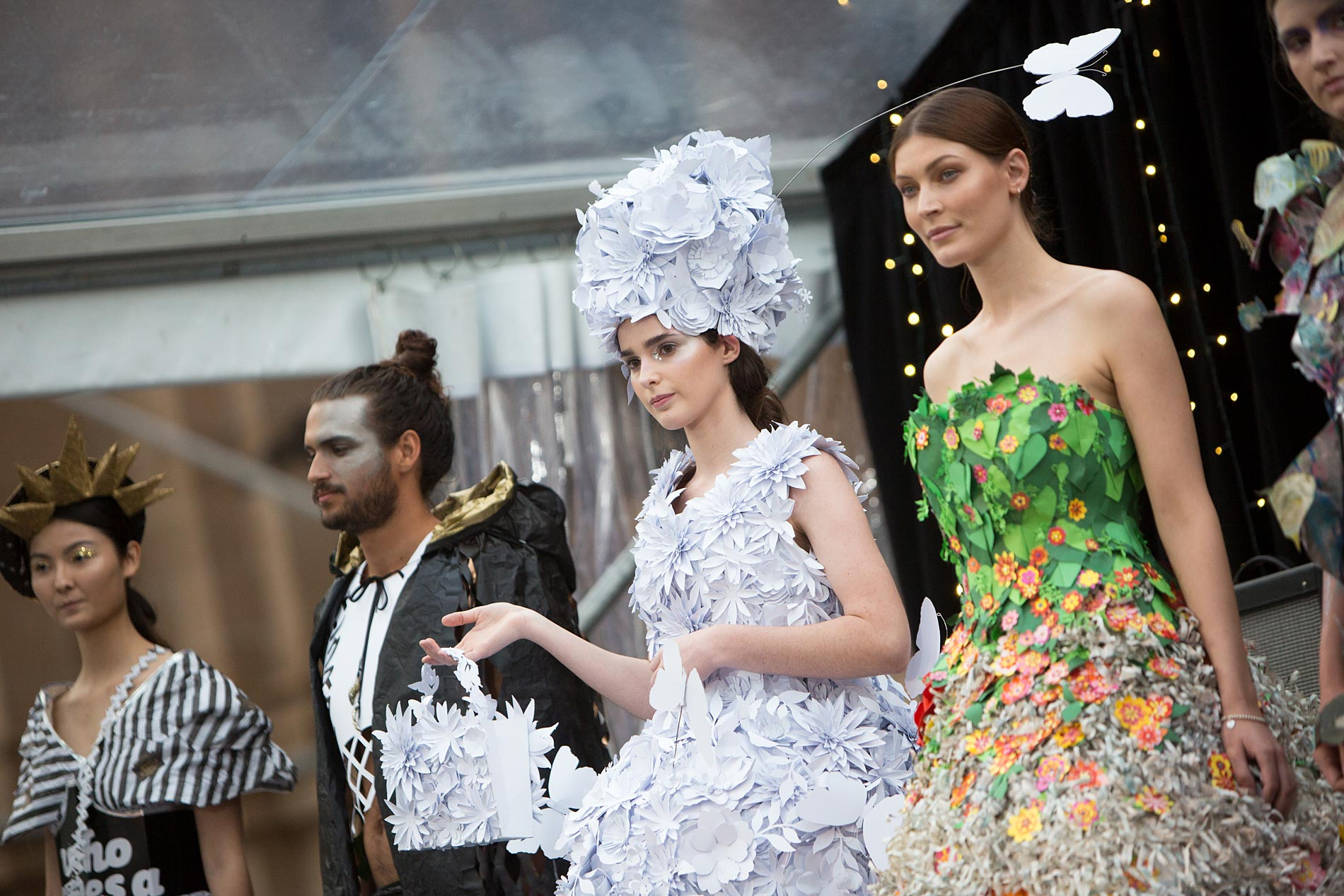
2017 Paper Fashion Show, a form of sustainable fashion, in King George Square

Brisbane fashion is often characterised by a “beach-to-bar” versatility, reflecting the city's proximity to coastal destinations and outdoor lifestyle, with garments designed to transition easily between daytime and evening settings. Vintage and second-hand fashion has also become prominent in neighbourhoods such as West End, where there are various curated resale boutiques and markets.

== Cuisine ==
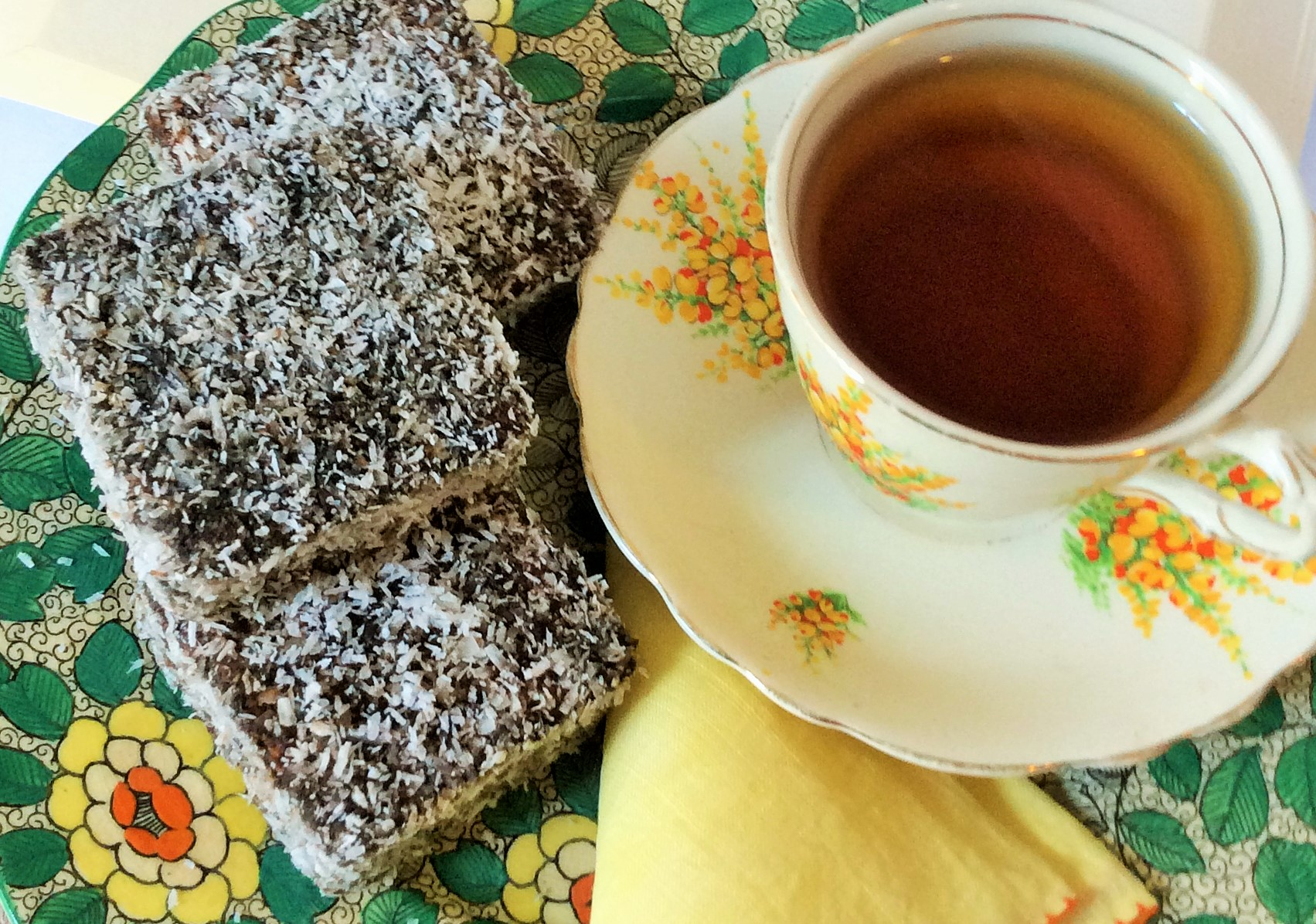
Lamingtons and a cuppa

Brisbane is home to over 6,000 restaurants and dining establishments, with outdoor dining featuring prominently. The most popular cuisines by number of dining establishments are Japanese, Chinese, Modern Australian, Italian, American, Indian, and Vietnamese.

Moreton Bay bugs, less commonly known as flathead lobsters, are an ingredient named for the Brisbane region and which feature commonly in the city's cuisine, along with macadamia nuts, also native to the region.

The lamington, a sponge cake coated in chocolate and desiccated coconut, is widely believed to have originated in Brisbane and is considered an iconic Australian dessert.

== Festivals ==
Brisbane hosts several festivals throughout the year, attracting both local and international audiences across arts, music, food, and cultural events.

The Ekka, an agricultural exhibition held each August at the Brisbane Showgrounds in Bowen Hills, is the longest-running major annual event in Brisbane. During the Ekka, a public holiday is observed in each local government area across Brisbane to enable widespread public attendance.

The Brisbane Festival, held each September at South Bank Parklands, the CBD, and surrounding areas, is one of Australia’s largest international arts festivals. It features a city-wide program of performances, exhibitions, and public events, and culminates in Riverfire, one of the nation’s largest annual fireworks displays.

Other major recurring festivals include the Brisbane Writers Festival, the internationally recognised World Science Festival, Valley Fiesta, and the Brisbane Comedy Festival held at the Brisbane Powerhouse. Its food festivals include the Caxton Street Seafood and Wine Festival, the Moreton Bay Food Festival, Night Feast, the Paniyiri Greek Festival (Australia’s oldest Greek festival), BrisAsia Festival, and Le Festival, highlighting the city’s multicultural character. Alongside these, numerous smaller community and neighbourhood festivals occur across Fortitude Valley, South Bank, West End, and other precincts.

Additionally, the Abbey Medieval Festival in Caboolture is recognised as Australia’s largest medieval fair and the biggest event of its kind in the Southern Hemisphere, drawing tens of thousands of visitors annually for jousting, historical reenactments, markets, and performances.

== Parks and gardens ==
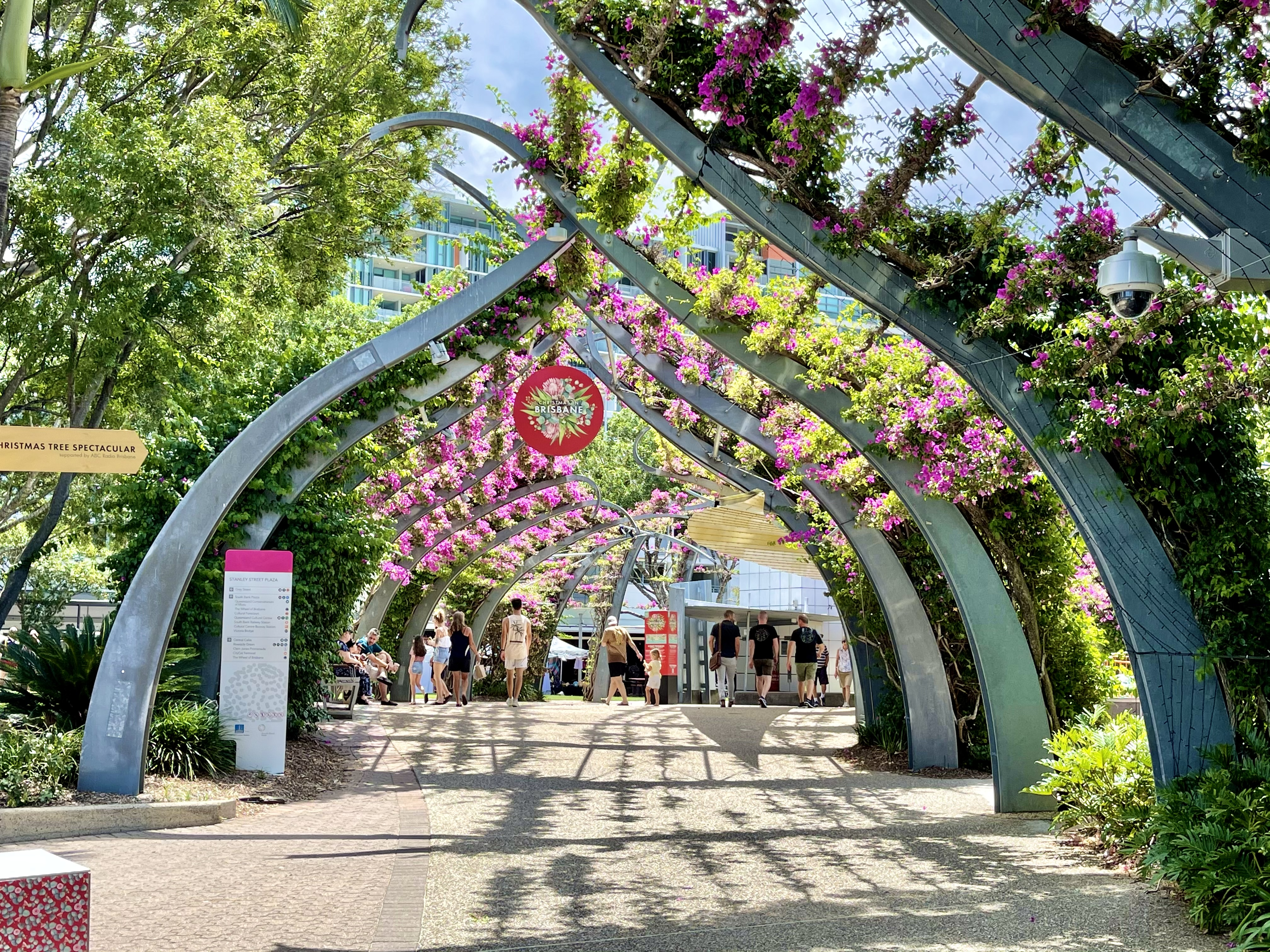
The Grand Arbour in South Bank Parklands, 2020

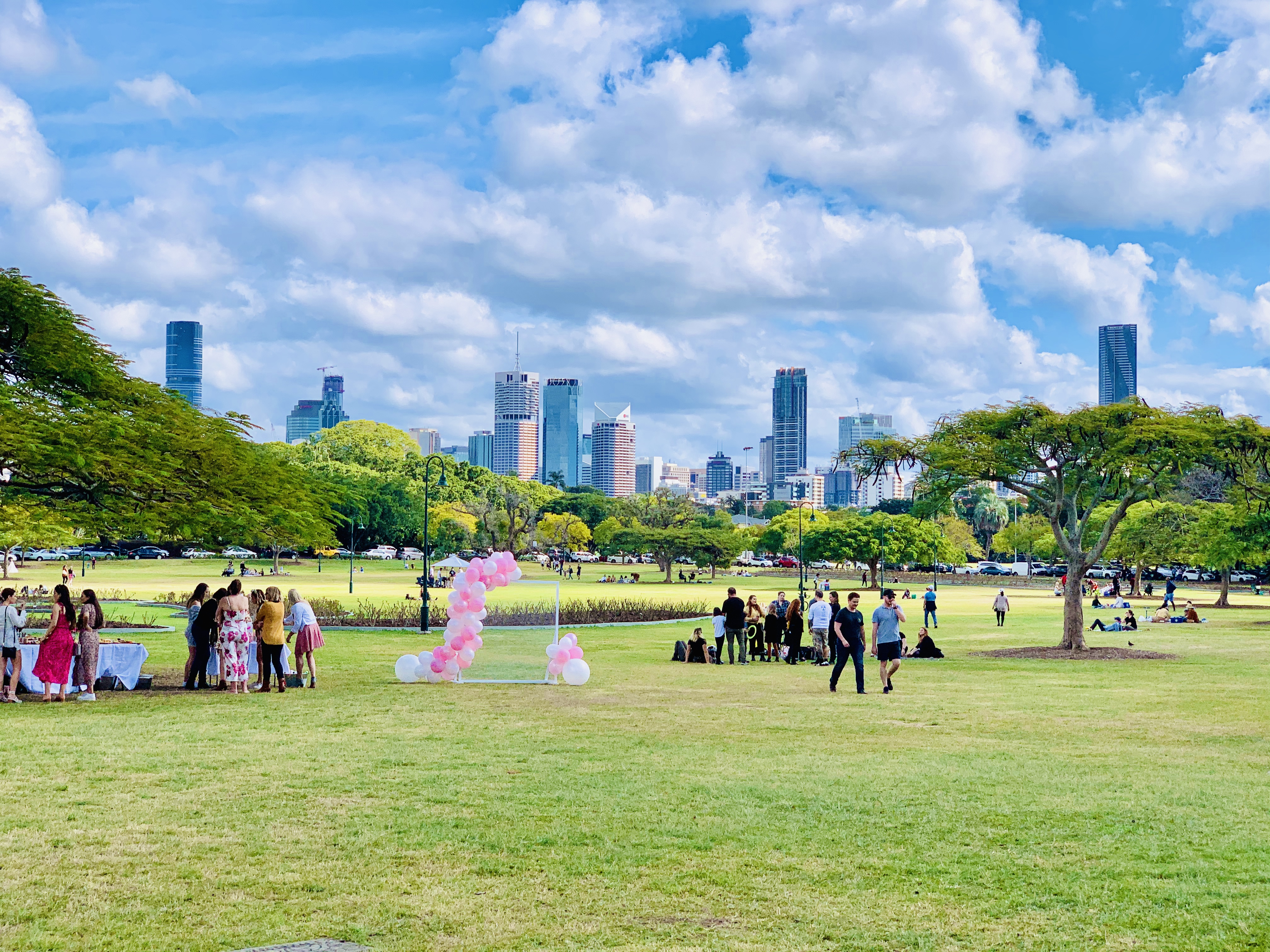
New Farm Park looking toward Brisbane CBD, 2020

Brisbane is known for its extensive network of parks, gardens, and tree-lined streets, with more than 2,000 parks across the City of Brisbane area.

Flowering and ornamental street trees form a distinctive part of the city’s landscape, particularly the jacaranda, which produces vivid purple blossoms in late spring and is widely associated with Brisbane’s seasonal character. Other notable trees include the poinciana, Illawarra flame tree, bougainvillea, poinsettia, golden penda, pink trumpet tree, native frangipani, and the Brisbane Golden Wattle, the city’s official floral emblem. Large fig trees such as Hill’s fig and the Moreton Bay fig are commonly planted along major streets and in parks. Native species including hoop pine and broad-leaved paperbark also contribute to the city’s urban environment. Many ornamental and flowering trees were introduced during the 19th century by Walter Hill, the first curator of the Brisbane Botanic Gardens from 1855 to 1881, who played a key role in establishing the city’s botanical collections and introducing species such as jacaranda and poinciana to Queensland.

The jacaranda is also associated with a long-standing student tradition at the University of Queensland. According to campus folklore, if a jacaranda flower falls on a student during exam season, they will fail their exams, a superstition often referred to as the “Jacaranda myth”.

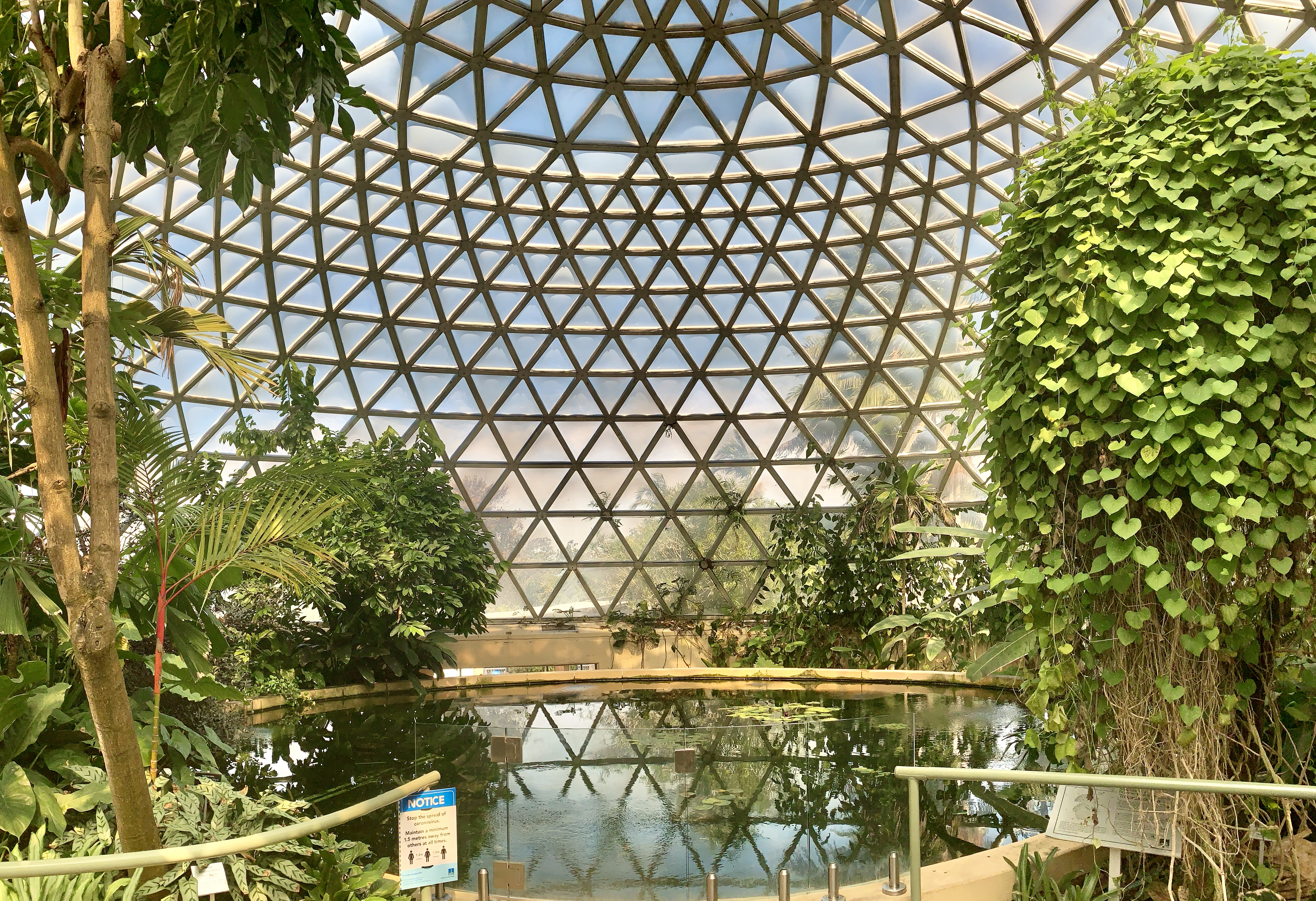
Tropical Display Dome of the Brisbane Botanic Gardens, 2020

Brisbane contains numerous major public parks and botanical gardens. The City Botanic Gardens along the Brisbane River is one of the city’s oldest public parks, established in the mid-19th century. The Brisbane Botanic Gardens serves as the city’s principal botanical garden and includes themed gardens, tropical plant collections, and the Sir Thomas Brisbane Planetarium. Other prominent green spaces include South Bank Parklands, a riverside cultural and recreational precinct developed on the site of Expo '88, and Roma Street Parkland, one of the world’s largest subtropical garden parks located in a city centre. Many of Brisbane’s parks are connected to the Brisbane River, with riverfront promenades, gardens, and recreation areas forming an important part of the city’s landscape.

Several historic and neighbourhood parks are also significant within Brisbane’s urban environment. New Farm Park is noted for its riverside lawns and avenues of jacaranda trees, while Newstead Park surrounds the city’s oldest surviving European residence. Victoria Park is one of Brisbane’s largest inner-city green spaces and is undergoing redevelopment into a major public parkland. Nearby, the Mount Coot-tha Forest forms a large natural reserve of eucalypt forest and bushland, providing walking tracks, mountain biking trails, and habitat for native wildlife.

== Sport ==
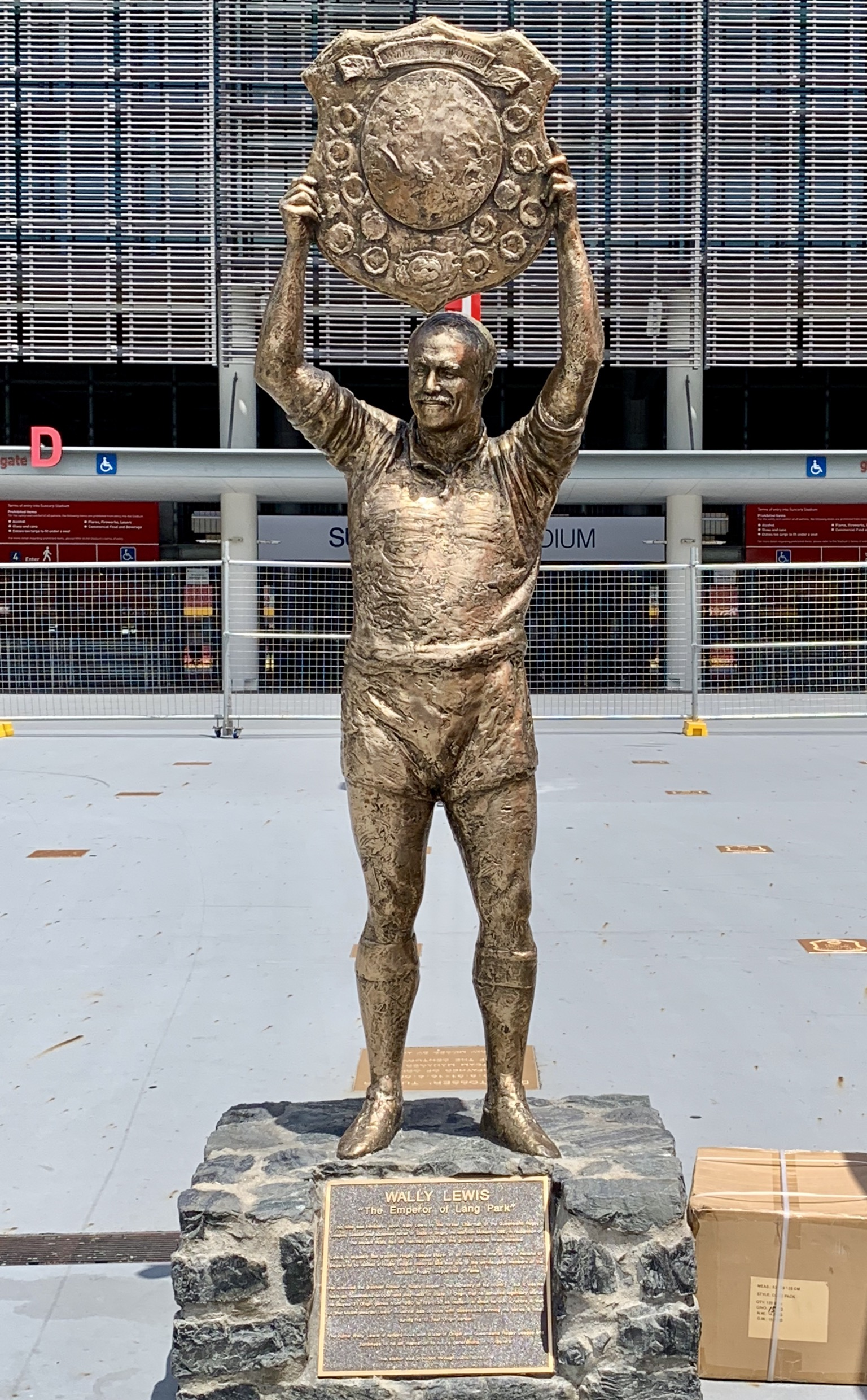
Statue of Wally Lewis 'The King' at Lang Park, 2018

Brisbane is home to numerous professional sports teams and hosts a range of national and international sporting events. The city hosts the annual Bridge to Brisbane and Brisbane Marathon running events, as well as the Brisbane International tennis tournament. Major golf events include the Australian PGA Championship, held at the Royal Queensland Golf Club, one of the richest and most prestigious tournaments on the PGA Tour of Australasia. The Brisbane to Gladstone yacht race is a major annual sailing event starting in Brisbane and attracting competitors from across Australia.

The city’s stadiums, such as Suncorp Stadium, Queensland Sport and Athletics Centre, and The Gabba, host rugby league, rugby union, Australian rules football, cricket, and athletics events. Brisbane also hosts the NRL Magic Round, a unique four-day festival where every National Rugby League match of the round is played at Suncorp Stadium, and the annual State of Origin series between Queensland and New South Wales. Other popular sports include soccer, basketball, netball, and rowing, with competitions such as the Queensland Basketball League and Brisbane River regattas.

Brisbane has been recognised as one of Australia’s leading sports cities, ranking highly in the 2025 Burson Index of Global Sports Cities, reflecting its major events, professional teams, and sporting facilities.

== Urban legends and folklore ==
Brisbane has a number of local legends, ghost stories, and folklore that form part of the city’s cultural identity. Toowong Cemetery, Queensland’s largest burial ground, has long been the focus of ghost stories and paranormal accounts. Guided ghost tours and local storytelling events explore these legends, highlighting spectral figures and unexplained phenomena among the cemetery’s historic graves. Other reported haunted sites include the South Brisbane Cemetery, Boggo Road Gaol, and Mount Coot-tha Forest.

== Notable Brisbane people ==
- Artists from Brisbane
- List of Brisbane people

== See also ==
- List of festivals in Brisbane
- List of museums in Brisbane
