= Queensland Cultural Centre =

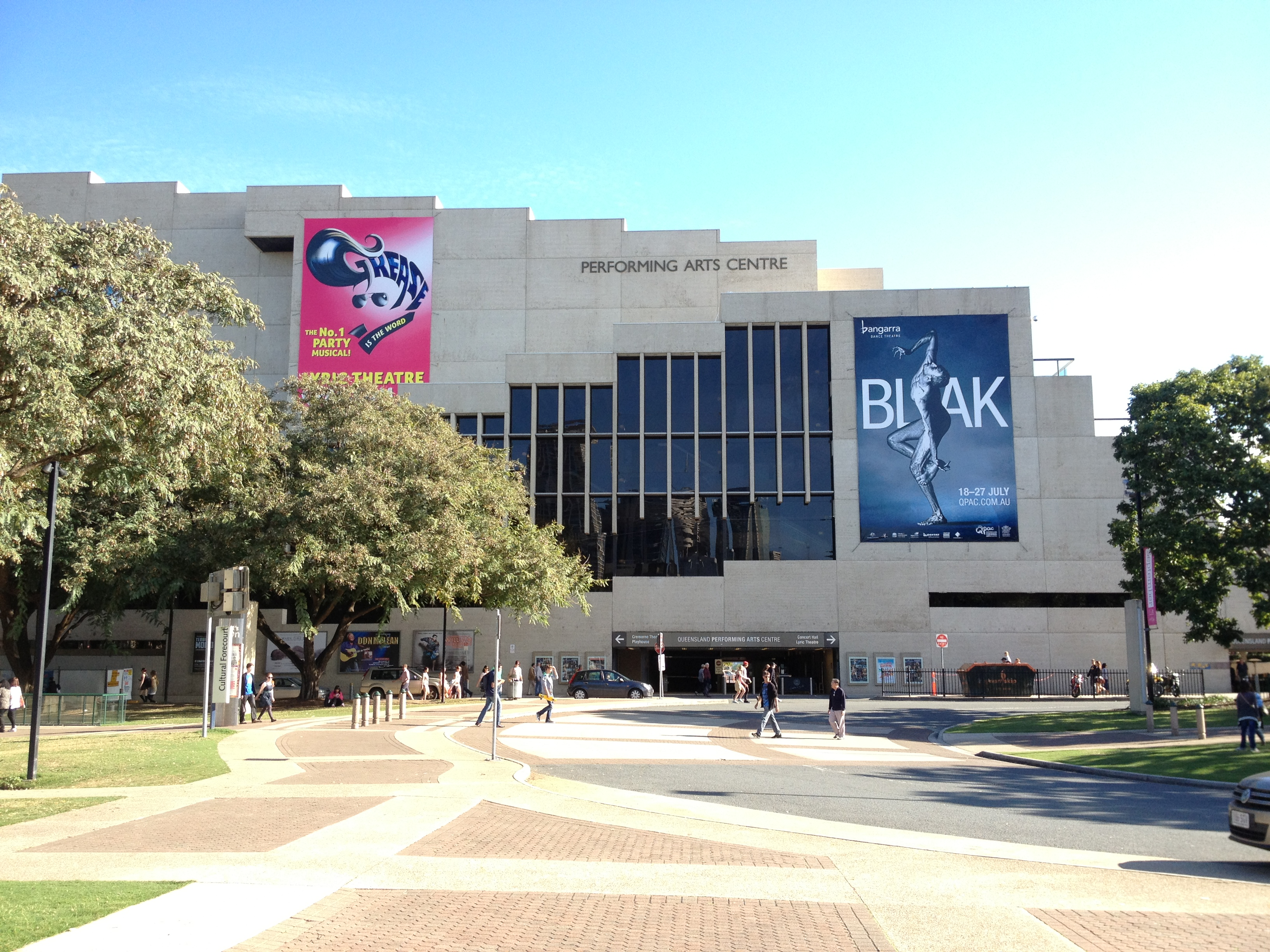
- Queensland Performing Arts Centre, part of the Queensland Cultural Centre, 2013

- Location within Queensland
- 27.4727°S 153.0184°E
- Location: Grey Street, South Brisbane, City of Brisbane, Queensland, Australia

History
- Design period: 1970s–1990s (Late 20th century)
- Built: from 1976
- Built for: Queensland Government

Queensland Heritage Register
- Official name: Queensland Cultural Centre
- Type: state heritage
- Designated: 12 June 2015
- Reference no.: 602844
- Type: Recreation and entertainment: Entertainment centre
- Theme: Creating social and cultural institutions: Cultural activities

The Queensland Cultural Centre (QCC) is a heritage-listed cultural centre on Grey Street in South Brisbane, Queensland, Australia. It is part of the South Bank precinct located on the Brisbane River, and was built from 1976 onwards, in time for the 1988 World's Fair.

The centre comprises the Queensland Performing Arts Centre (QPAC), the Queensland Museum, the State Library of Queensland (SLQ), the Queensland Art Gallery (QAG) and the Queensland Gallery of Modern Art (GOMA). The original part was designed by Brisbane architects Robin Gibson and Partners and opened in 1985. The centre is surrounded by subtropical gardens and features cafes, restaurants, bookstores, and other public facilities.

The southwestern portion of the centre was added to the Queensland Heritage Register on 12 June 2015. The Heritage Register includes the Queensland Performing Arts Centre, the Queensland Museum, the Queensland Art Gallery, but does not include the newer Queensland Gallery of Modern Art or the renovated State Library of Queensland.

== History ==
The Queensland Cultural Centre (QCC), located on the south bank of the Brisbane River across from the central business district, is a cultural facility. The facility is built in a modernist architectural style. It was designed between 1976 and 1998 by architect Robin Gibson in collaboration with the Queensland Department of Public Works.

The Cultural Centre includes the Queensland Art Gallery (1982), the Queensland Performing Arts Centre (1984), the Queensland Museum (1986), the Queensland State Library, and the former Fountain Room Restaurant and Auditorium (1988), now State Library of Queensland's 'The Edge' (2015). The substantially-altered State Library and Gallery of Modern Art are part of the broader Cultural District, but are not heritage-listed.

=== South Brisbane before the Queensland Cultural Centre ===
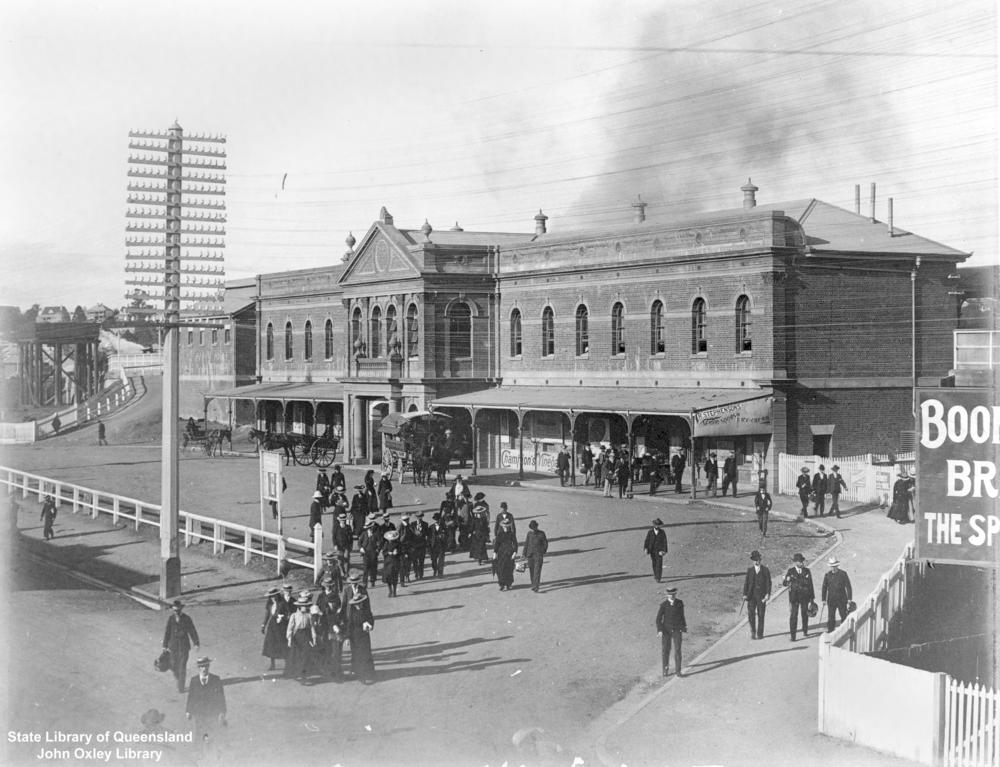
South Brisbane railway station, 1902, now a neighbour of the Queensland Cultural Centre

Prior to European settlement, the entire South Brisbane Peninsula was known as Kurilpa, an important gathering place for the Yuggera/Jagera people. The tip of the South Brisbane Peninsula was a traditional river crossing. After the establishment of the Moreton Bay Penal settlement in 1825, convicts cleared the river flats to grow crops for the settlement and in the 1830s timber was exported from the south bank to Sydney.

From the 1840s, South Brisbane emerged as one of the most important locations for port activity in Queensland, initially aided by direct access to the Darling Downs and Ipswich. As maritime trade expanded, shipyards and warehouses were gradually built along the river. Over time, a range of commercial, light industrial, and manufacturing activities also developed, as well as civic and residential uses.

The area prospered in the 1880s and South Brisbane became a municipality (the Borough of South Brisbane) in 1888. As part of the development boom, a dry dock was opened in 1881, coal wharves and associated rail links were built, and South Brisbane railway station was established as the terminus for suburban and rural trains.

By the end of the 19th century, the area had developed into a substantial urban settlement, with Stanley Street as a major retail centre and thoroughfare.

In 1911, the Cremorne Theatre (then called the Cremorne Gardens) opened where the Queensland Art Gallery now stands, on Stanley Street, South Brisbane. It was used mostly for vaudeville, variety shows and for occasional drama productions. By mid-1952, the building was remodeled to be used as office and storage space for film rental companies. In 1954, it burnt down and was never rebuilt. The current Cremorne Theatre in the Queensland Cultural Centre was named in its honour.

By the late 1960s, much of South Brisbane, especially along the river, was in economic decline due to the reorientation of economic activity and transport networks. Shipyards, stores, and rail sidings were closed and subsequently demolished as shipping increasingly moved downriver. The decline of such a centrally located area in the capital provided an opportunity for extensive urban renewal.

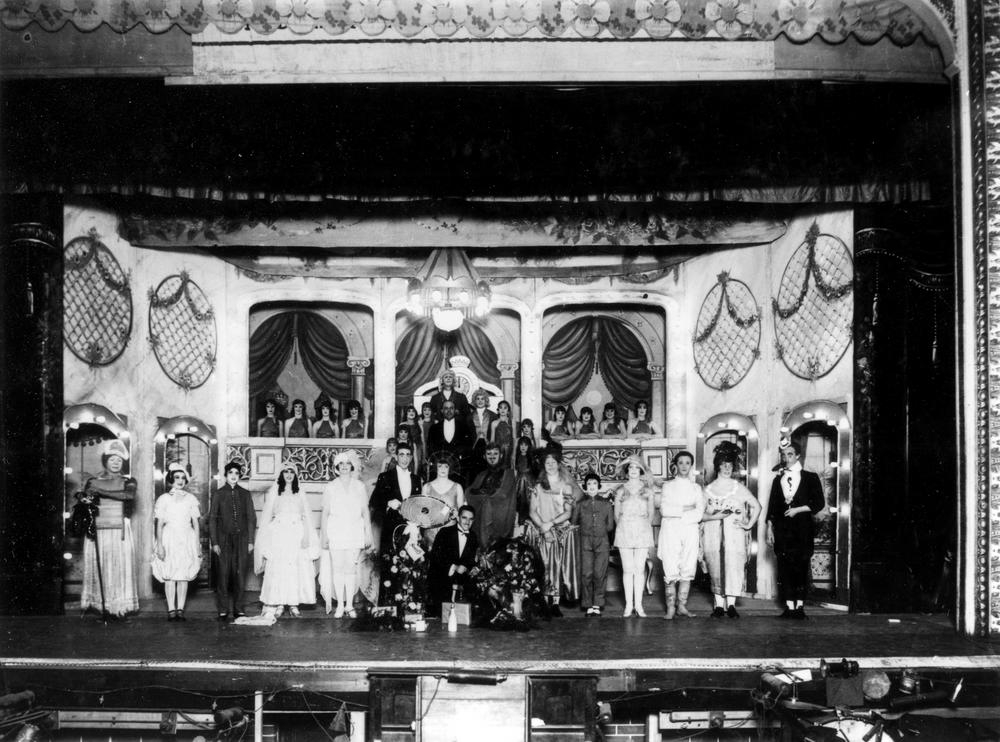
Cast in costume on stage at the Cremorne Theatre, c. 1927

=== Impetus for the Queensland Cultural Centre ===
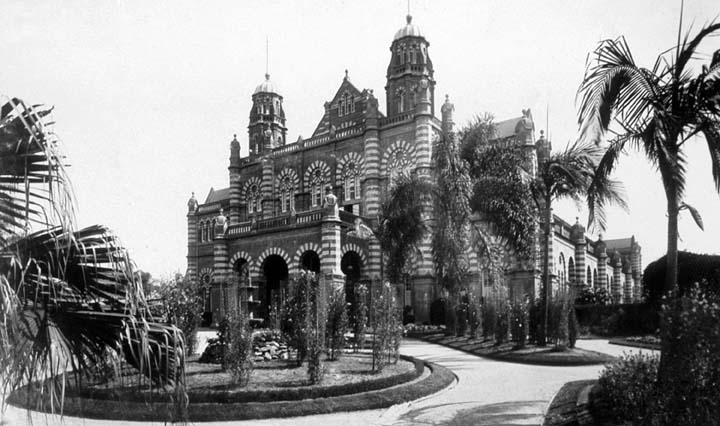
Old Museum Building, Gregory Terrace, 1926

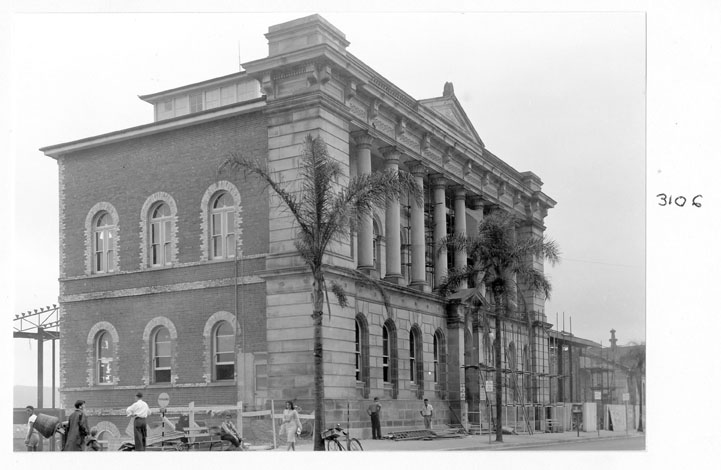
Old State Library of Queensland being extended in 1959

Pressure to address the lack of adequate cultural facilities in Queensland increased in the 1960s as public awareness of the importance of the arts to the cultural health of the community grew. At that time, Queensland's major cultural institutions were located in buildings and sites in Brisbane that did not meet their current or future needs. The first purpose-built museum opened on William Street in 1879, but proved inadequate from the start. It was converted to the Public Library of Queensland (the State Library from 1971) in 1900–02, after the 1889 Exhibition Building at Bowen Hills was converted for use as a Museum in 1900. From 1895, the Queensland Art Gallery was housed in the Brisbane Town Hall, moving in 1905 to a purpose designed room on the third floor in the new Executive Building overlooking George Street. When the new City Hall was completed in 1930, the Concert Hall at the Museum building was remodeled to house the art gallery.

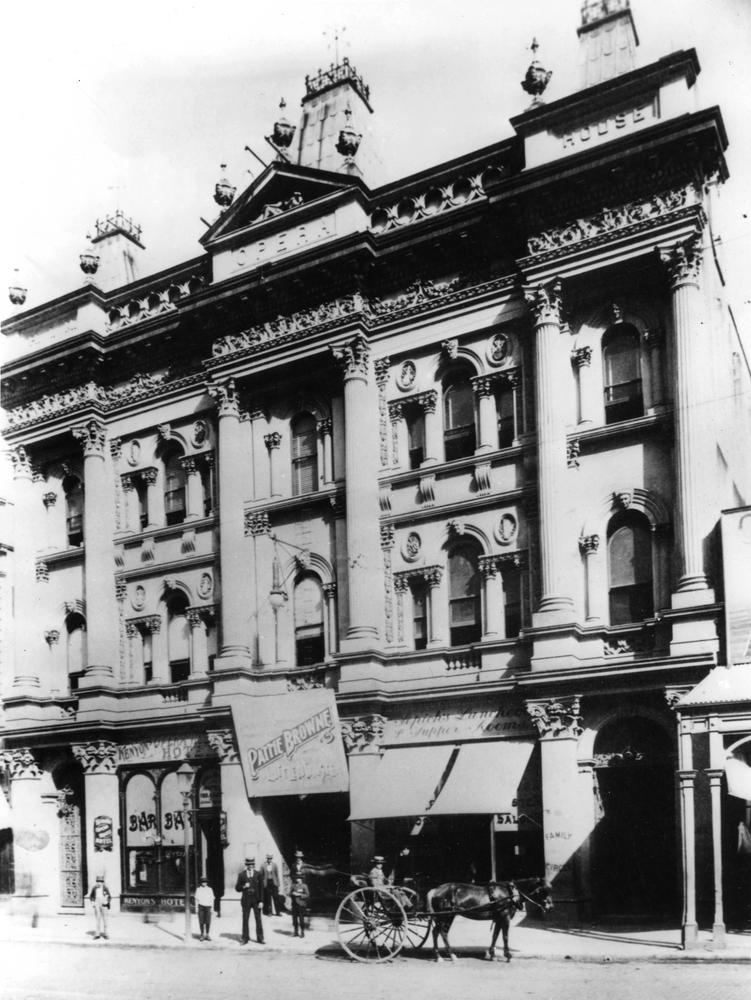
Her Majesty's Theatre, Brisbane, c. 1898

Until the opening of the Queensland Cultural Centre, there were no government-run performing arts facilities in Queensland. Most music and theatre performances were initially held in local venues such as art schools, churches, or town halls, which had varying degrees of suitability. Purpose-built facilities were limited and were constructed only in larger centres. By the 1880s, Brisbane had four theatres, of which the 2700-seat Opera House (later Her Majesty's Theatre ), built in 1888, was the most magnificent and prestigious. The Exhibition Building was one of the first buildings designed specifically for musical performances and contained a concert hall with a four-manual pipe organ. It became the centre for major musical events until the opening of the Brisbane City Hall in 1930.

Throughout Australia in the postwar period, major arts development projects were undertaken by governments at all levels, including stand-alone and integrated projects for institutions such as libraries, theatres, and art galleries. The sites for such projects were often in centrally located areas where previous uses and activities were in decline or had become redundant. This type of urban renewal provided a blank slate for development, where the existing layout could be reconfigured and the built environment reshaped. Construction of the Sydney Opera House began in 1959; preliminary investigations for the Adelaide Festival Centre began in 1964; the National Gallery of Australia was established in 1967; the first phase of the Victorian Arts Centre, the National Gallery of Victoria, was completed in 1969; and the Civic Centre in Perth was also developed in the 1960s.

In Queensland in the 1930s, there was an earlier phase of civic buildings (primarily town halls and council chambers) that often included spaces for arts and cultural activities. In the early 1950s, architect and urban planner Karl Langer designed town centres for larger regional centres such as Mackay, Toowoomba and Kingaroy.

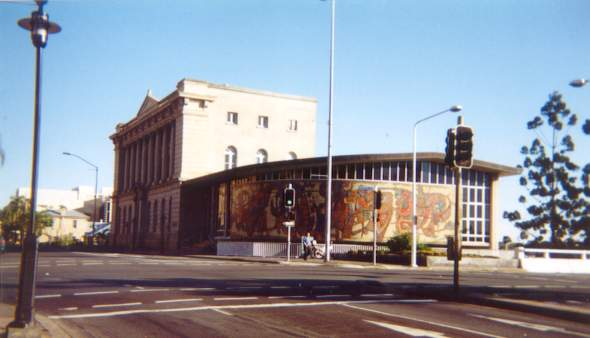
Extension of the Old State Library

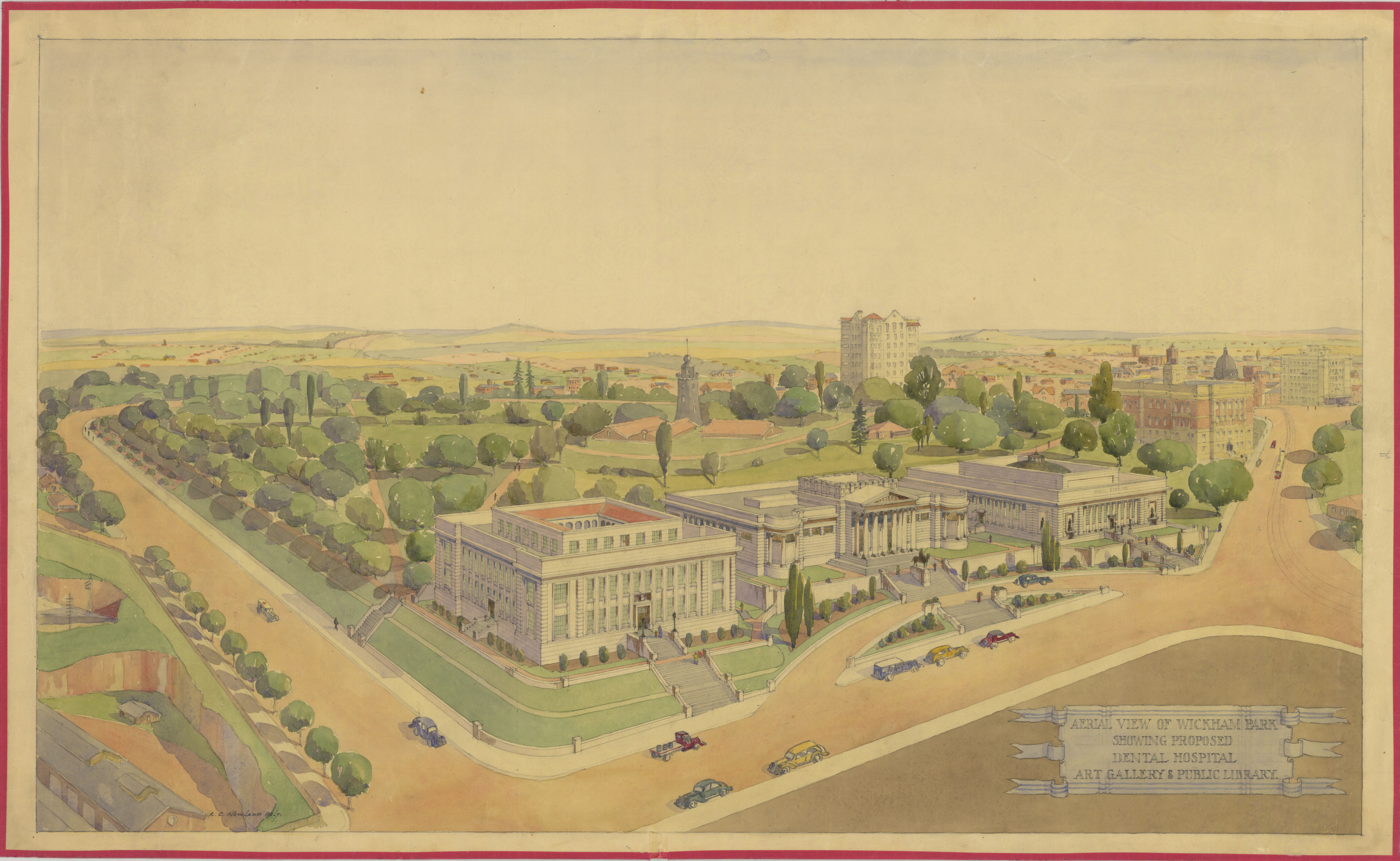
Aerial view (perspective) of Wickham Park showing proposed Dental Hospital, Art Gallery and Public Library, in Turbot Street, 1938

Several attempts were made to build stately cultural institutions in the Queensland capital, but all failed. The construction of an art gallery and museum near the entrance to Government Domain on land granted in 1863 never materialized. In the 1890s, a major architectural competition was held for a museum and art gallery on land in Albert Park to meet the need for adequate space. In 1934, on a nearby site along Wickham Park and Turbot Street, an ambitious urban design proposal to incorporate a public art gallery, library and dental hospital resulted only in the construction of the Brisbane Dental Hospital. Post-World War II plans to incorporate the art gallery into the extensions to the original Supreme Court Building did not come to fruition. The Queensland Art Gallery Act of 1959 paved the way for a new board of trustees to establish the gallery with public funds subsidized by the government. The proposal at that time, for a gallery and performance hall at Gardens Point, to mark Queensland's centenary, was not realised; however, an extension to the State Library proceeded and included an exhibition hall and reading rooms.

A proposal for a State Gallery and Centre for Allied Arts, on the former municipal markets site adjacent to the Roma Street railway station, formed part of a government backed plan for the redevelopment of the Roma Street area. Prepared by Bligh Jessup Bretnall & Partners in 1967, the project included a series of city blocks inspired by the redevelopment of vacant downtowns in Europe and new cities in America, and included a significant commercial component. The plan was abandoned in 1968 due to conflicting local and state interests and the lack of acceptable supply.

The following year, the Treasury Department initiated a formal investigation into a suitable site for an art gallery, led by Treasurer, Deputy Premier and Liberal Party Leader, Gordon Chalk. An expert committee, including Coordinator-General Charles Barton as chair, Under-Secretary of Works David Mercer and Assistant Under-Secretary Roman Pavlyshyn, considered 12 sites, including those from previous proposals. Three sites were shortlisted:

- The Holy Name Cathedral site in Fortitude Valley
- Upstream of the Victoria Bridge at South Brisbane
- The BCC Transport Depot in Coronation Drive

The South Brisbane site was preferred as it was considered the most advantageous to the city and the most architecturally appropriate. The recommendation was accepted and work began on a design.

In 1972, the Queensland Government decided to build a new Queensland Art Gallery as part of the project. Later, during 1974, the government decided to build a comprehensive Queensland Cultural Centre that would include the Queensland Performing Arts Centre, the State Library of Queensland, the Queensland Museum, and the Queensland Art Gallery, so that all of these facilities would be in close proximity to each other and would also be easily accessible to Brisbane central business district.

=== Architectural competition and concept ===
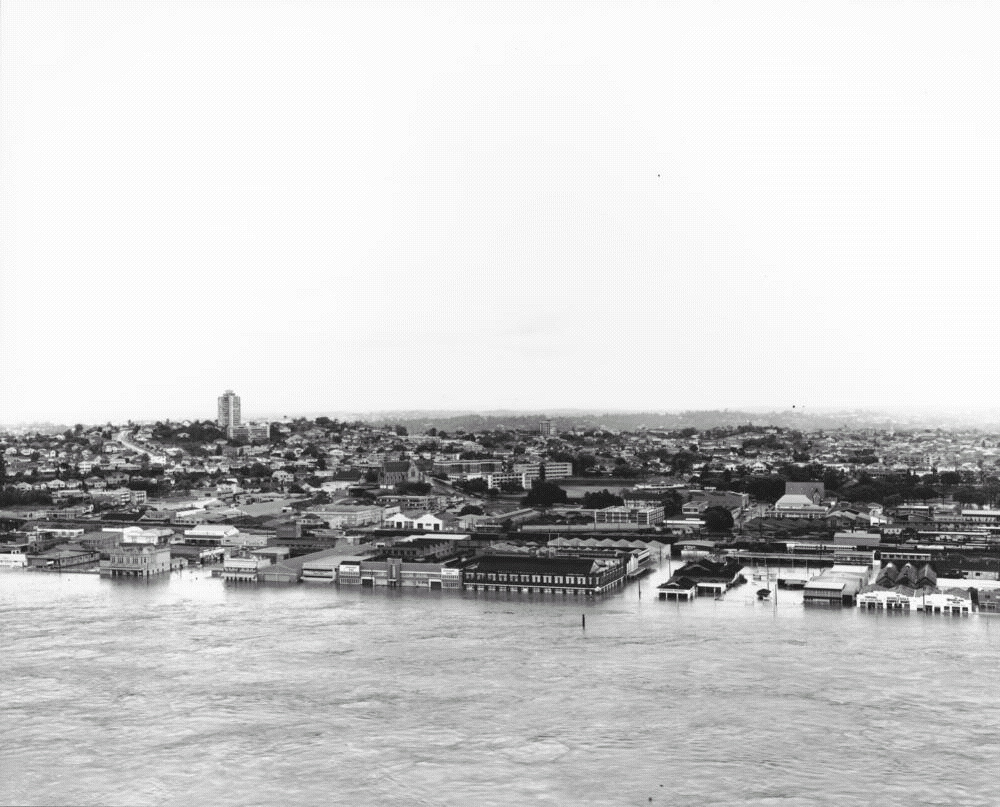
1974 flood of the Brisbane River in the South Brisbane area

In April 1973, Robin Gibson and Partners Architects won a two-stage competition to design the new Queensland Art Gallery in South Brisbane with a sophisticated design that was considered superior in its simplicity and presentation. While this design was never realised, the art gallery built as part of the cultural centre was very similar in many ways, including the material palette and modernist design details inspired by the Oakland Museum in California in 1969. The original design occupied the block bounded by Melbourne, Grey, Stanley and Peel Streets. Over Stanley Street, a pedestrian walkway connected the gallery to the top of an amphitheatre leading to sculpture gardens along the river.

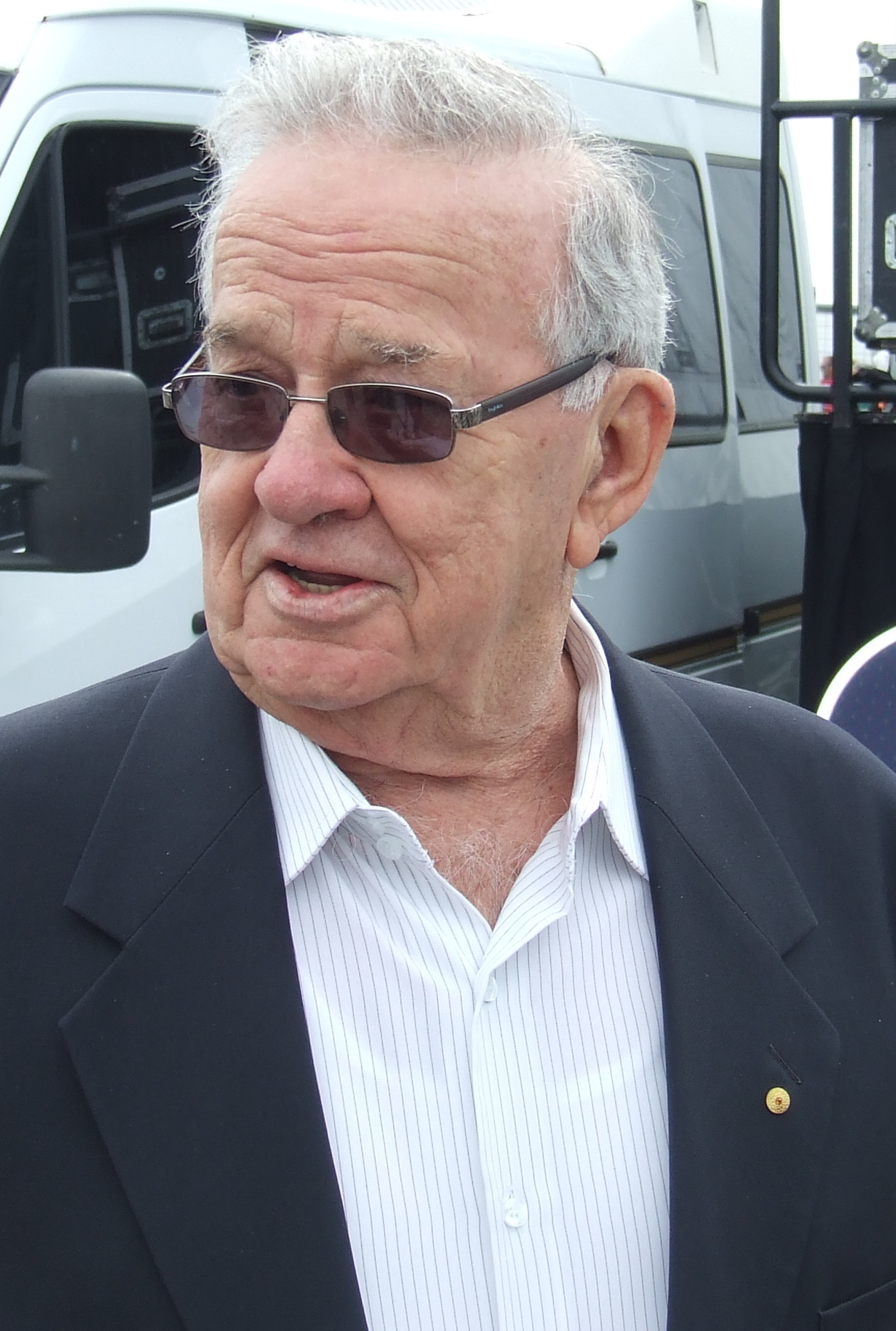
Sir Leo Hielscher

The development of cultural institutions was reconsidered during 1974 and evolved into a much more ambitious project. In early November, Deputy Premier Sir Gordon Chalk (who had a genuine interest and commitment to the development of the arts in Queensland) announced a proposal for a $45 million cultural complex as an election campaign measure. While the development of the Art Gallery had been progressing, Chalk, with the assistance of Under Treasurer Leo Hielscher, had covertly commissioned Robin Gibson to produce a master plan for an integrated complex of buildings which would form the Queensland Cultural Centre (QCC). The plan included an Art Gallery, Museum, Performing Arts Centre, State Library and an auditorium and restaurant. The devastating floods of January 1974, which had further hastened the decline of South Brisbane, provided a timely opportunity to use more space adjacent to the river, through resumptions of flood-prone land. When the proposal was submitted to Cabinet by Chalk in late November, it was initially opposed by Premier Joh Bjelke-Petersen. However, the support of Brisbane's Lord Mayor, Clem Jones, (who gifted council-owned allotments on what became the QPAC site); influential public servants Hielscher, Pavlyshyn; Mercer, and Sir David Muir, Director of the Department of Commercial and Industrial Development, helped the project gain momentum. After winning the December 7 election, the proposal was formally adopted by the Bjelke-Petersen government. Muir was appointed chairman of the planning committee and became the first chairman of the QCC Trust.

Gibson's November 1974 master plan for the Cultural Centre differed significantly from his winning competition design for the Gallery and gave Gibson an opportunity to further demonstrate his planning principles for downtown development. Stanley Street was to be rerouted under the Victoria Bridge to Peel Street, with the art gallery and museum occupying a large block. The design called for building forms with oblique angles to the street grid to accommodate major access points. The performing arts building, consisting of a single multi-purpose hall, and the art gallery, extending from the museum to the riverfront, were oriented diagonally around the Melbourne Street axis to provide access from the Victoria Bridge. Pedestrian bridges provided access to the site via Melbourne Street and to South Brisbane Station via Gray Street.

While maintaining the approved general arrangement of the individual buildings, the following changes were made to the plan of the complex: the orthogonal realignment of the individual buildings, the doubling of the multi-purpose hall to provide separate spaces for musical and theatrical performances, the extension of an existing Stanley Street detour upstream to Peel Street and under the Victoria Bridge, which was bridged by a wide plaza as the forecourt of the Gallery.

=== Robin Gibson & Partners ===
Robin Gibson (1930–2014) attended Yeronga State School and Brisbane State High School before studying architecture at the University of Queensland (UQ). After graduating in 1954, Gibson travelled through Europe and worked in London in the offices of architects, Sir Hugh Casson, Neville Conder, and James Cubitt and Partners. Returning to Brisbane in 1957, he set up an architectural practice commencing with residential projects, soon expanding into larger commercial, public and institutional work. Notable Queensland architects employed by his practice included Geoffrey Pie, Don Winsen, Peter Roy, Allan Kirkwood, Bruce Carlyle and Gabriel Poole.

Robin Gibson & Partners' contribution to Queensland's built environment is significant. Other major architectural projects include: Mayne Hall, University of Queensland (UQ) (1972), Central Library, UQ (1973) Library and Humanities building at Nathan Campus, Griffith University (1975), Post Office Square (1982), Queen Street Mall (1982), Wintergarden building (1984), Colonial Mutual Life (1984) and 111 George Street (1993). Over time, Gibson and his body of work has been highly acclaimed and recognised through numerous awards including: 1968 Royal Australian Institute of Architects (RAIA) Building of the Year Award for Kenmore Church; 1982 RAIA Sir Zelman Cowen Award for Public Architecture for the Queensland Art Gallery; 1982 RAIA Canberra Medallion for the Belconnen Library, ACT; 1982 Queenslander of the Year; 1983 Order of Australia; 1986 Honorary Doctorate, Griffith University; 1988 Advance Australia Award; 1989 RAIA Gold Medal for outstanding performance and contributions; 2000; the 2004 RAIA Robin Gibson Award for Enduring Architecture for Queensland Art Gallery and 2010 Robin Gibson Award for Enduring Architecture for the Queensland Performing Arts Centre.

=== Construction and completion ===
The design development, documentation, and multifaceted construction program for the entire complex were led by Roman Pavlyshyn, Director of Construction at the Ministry of Public Works. Pavlyshyn had previously overseen the site selection and managed the competition for the Queensland Art Gallery. The cultural centre was to continue the Department of Public Works' tradition of constructing buildings of high quality design, materials and construction throughout the state.

The funding of the QCC came entirely from the government-owned Golden Casket. The revenue derived from the Golden Casket was effectively "freed up" from health funding after Medicare was introduced by the Whitlam government. Annual revenues of $4 million at the time were to fund construction of the QCC over 10 years. By the early 1980s, the effects of inflation had driven costs up to $175 million. Under Hielscher's leadership, the Queensland Treasury sought other ways to raise revenue. In response, Instant Scratch-Its and midweek lotteries were introduced in Queensland. This successful increase in gaming revenue allowed the QCC to be built at no additional cost to the state budget and without going into debt.

The construction of the cultural centre was a complex undertaking and involved a multi-faceted program that spanned 11 years and involved thousands of workers, from the design office to the on-site laborers. Pavlyshyn managed Phases One, Two and Three through completion and the start of Phase Four before retiring in July 1985. With so many contractors and suppliers involved, quality control was a critical factor in a successful outcome. For example, the consistent quality of the concrete finish was achieved by securing a guaranteed supply of the principal materials, South Australian white cement, Stradbroke Island sand and Pine River aggregates, for the duration of the project and the strict control of colour and mix for each contract.

The program began with the construction of the Art Gallery, the most developed building design. The first phase also included underground parking for the gallery and museum, and the central services building at the corner of Gray and Peel streets. Contractor Graham Evans & Co. began construction in March 1977 and the Art Gallery was officially opened by Prime Minister Joh Bjelke-Petersen on June 21, 1982.

A development plan for the largest component of the complex, the Queensland Performing Arts Centre (QPAC), built as Stage Two, was released in 1976. The project architect for the centre was Allan Kirkwood of Robin Gibson and Partners. Theater consultants Tom Brown and Peter Knowland, the Performing Arts Trust, and user committees were involved in the development and design of the centre. Completed in November 1984 by contractors Barclay Bros Pty Ltd, a concert for workers and the first public performance were held in December ahead of the official opening by the Duke and Duchess of Kent on 20 April 1985.

The centre included three venues, each specifically designed for certain types of performances. The Lyric Theatre and Concert Hall shared a common entrance on Melbourne Street with common and replicated foyers, bars, circulation spaces, and ancillary facilities. The Studio theatre, now the Cremorne, had a separate entrance and foyer on Stanley Street with its own discrete ancillary spaces.

The Lyric Theatre, (2200 seats) was designed for large dramatic productions such as operas, operettas, musicals, ballets and dance performances. It had an orchestra pit, a stalls, two balconies and side aisles. The 1800-seat concert hall was intended for orchestral concerts, choral performances, chamber music, recitals, popular entertainment and ceremonies. A Klais Grand organ with 6500 pipes was installed in the stage area. Its "shoebox" shape, designed to enhance natural acoustics, included an orchestra pit, stalls, a single balcony, side galleries, and side aisles. The studio theatre seated up to 300 for dramatic performances and could be configured in 6 different ways, from conventional setups to theatre in the round. It had a stalls and balcony level with an internal connection to the other two theatres.

The Queensland Museum (Stage Three), which opened in 1986, was connected to the Art Gallery by a covered walkway and to the Performing Arts Complex by a pedestrian bridge over Melbourne Street. The entrance on the Melbourne Street side was accessible from the street and the pedestrian bridge over Melbourne Street. The six-story museum building, constructed over the Stage One parking lot, had four floors open to the public, while the top two floors were for offices, laboratories, the library, and artifact storage. The second floor was intended for a variety of uses, including lecture halls, back of house, preparation areas, and workshops. On levels 2 through 4, collections were displayed in galleries located on either side of a central circulation core with corridors, stairs, elevators, and escalators. The outdoor area contained a geological garden on Grey Street side (in 2014 the Energex Playasaurus Place). Stage Four included the State Library and adjacent Fountain restaurant and auditorium building (now The Edge) completed in 1988.

=== Public artworks ===
As part of the construction of the QCC, several pieces of public art were commissioned from Australian artists. Five outdoor sculptures were purchased and installed in 1985, the largest commission of public sculpture at one time in Australia. Four were directly commissioned: Anthony Pryor's Approaching Equilibrium (Steel, painted. River plaza-upper deck); Leonard and Kathleen Shillam's Pelicans (Bronze. QAG Water Mall); Ante Dabro's Sisters (Bronze. Melbourne Street plaza) and Rob Robertson-Swann's Leviathan Play (Steel, painted. Melbourne Street plaza). Clement Meadmore's Offshoot (Aluminium, painted. Gallery plaza) was an existing work.

Other public artworks commissioned at the time of construction are located at QPAC: Lawrence Daws' large interior mural, Pacific Nexus and Robert Woodward's Cascade Court Fountain.

=== Use and modifications ===
With the exception of the Fountain restaurant (now The Edge), each of the buildings in the QCC has retained its original use. Subsequent alterations to accommodate changing needs have altered the buildings within the complex to varying degrees. The most significant of these changes were the Playhouse addition to the QPAC and the multi-million dollar Millennium Arts Project, which included a renovation of the entire complex.

The QPAC was well utilized from the beginning, and the need for a mid-sized theatre was soon recognised. Plans for Stage Five, a 750–850 seat Playhouse theatre designed by Gibson, were developed with input from the same committees and consultants as Stage Two. Completed in 1998 and added to the east end of the QPAC, the Playhouse had a stalls, balcony, centre platform, and balcony boxes for patron seating. It had a separate entrance off Russell Street and was separated from the rest of the complex by the loading dock. The Playhouse was renovated between 2011 and 2012.

The key features of the Millennium Arts Project (2002–2009) were: the addition of a new Gallery of Modern Art and public plaza; the major redevelopment of the State Library of Queensland, including the addition of a fifth floor; a new entrance to the Queensland Art Gallery, and refurbishment of the Queensland Museum and QPAC.

At the northwest end of the complex is the Gallery of Modern Art, completed in 2006, which houses Queensland's growing art collection and is connected to the rest of the complex via a public plaza.

The library's extensive renovation in 2006 included the addition of a fifth floor and significant changes to both the interior and exterior. A new entrance and circulation system were created. The stepped terraces were removed and replaced with a large addition facing the river. The new entrances to QAG and QM were designed by Gibson and completed in 2009.

The new entrance to the art gallery provided alternative access from Peel Street and included partial roofing of the courtyard, a new staircase, and an elevator. At the museum, in addition to the new entrance at the east end of the museum, a café was added at the west end, internal circulation was reconfigured, and a new entrance on Gray Street was created to provide access to the Sciencentre, which was moved from George Street to the first floor of the museum in 2009.

In 2009, QPAC was renovated to meet safety standards and improve access. A drop-off area was installed along Gray Street to replace the drop-off tunnel that closed in 2001. Changes to the circulation area included the installation of elevators and the replacement and realignment of stairs. The lobby bookstore was replaced with a bar, and other bars and lobbies were renovated, removing salmon-coloured trim in higher-traffic areas. Brown carpeting was installed and the red marble trim in the bars was replaced with black in the Lyric Theatre foyer and white in the Concert Hall foyer. Many seats were also replaced in the Lyric and Concert Hall. The Cremorne Theatre remains largely unchanged.

On 4 October 2009, Premier Anna Bligh officially opened the Kurilpa Bridge, a pedestrian and bicycle bridge, across the Brisbane River, connecting the northern part of the Brisbane CBD with the south bank of the river next to GOMA and close to SLQ, QAG and the Museum.

The Edge, operated and managed by SLQ, reopened in 2010 as a new facility with workshops, creative activity spaces, events and exhibitions. The sunken restaurant floor was filled in and new elevators were installed. Extensive changes were made to the interior design and finishes. The auditorium floor was replaced and new openings were created on the rear and side facades. The exterior structure was altered on the first floor with changes to the entrance and loading dock, which was made obsolete by changes to the entrance to the SLQ parking lot. The largest change to the exterior façade was cosmetic and included the enclosure of the open porch with prefabricated steel windows to create work and meeting spaces adjacent to the river.

=== 2014 proposed redevelopment ===
In 2014, the Australian Institute of Architects applied to give the Queensland Cultural Centre heritage status to protect it from proposals by the Newman government to add high-rise buildings to the site. The application attracted 1254 public submissions (a record for the heritage register). On 12 June 2015, the Queensland Cultural Centre was awarded heritage status. However, the Queensland Heritage Register listing only includes the 1980s buildings; the converted State Library of Queensland building and the newer Gallery of Modern Art are specifically excluded from heritage listing.

== Description ==
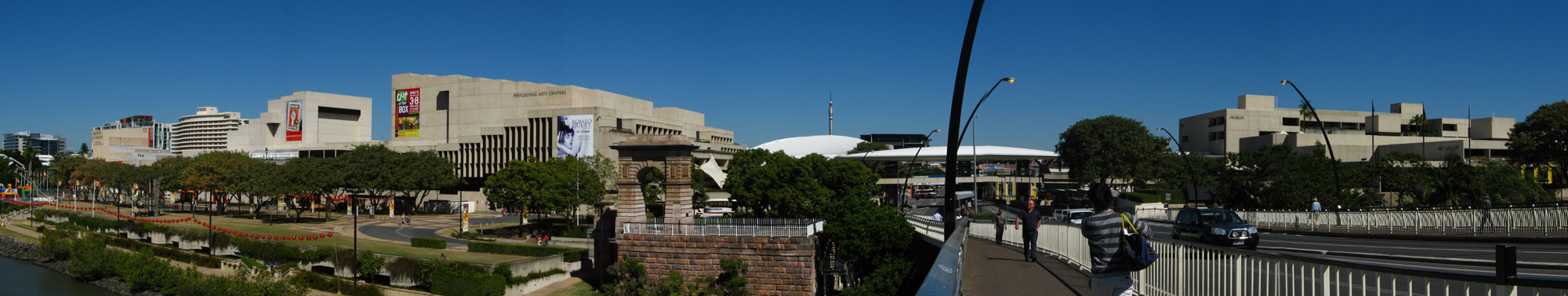
Panorama of the Queensland Cultural Centre – with the Queensland Performing Arts Centre (left) and the Queensland Art Gallery (right), and the Cultural Centre Busway Station, located in Melbourne Street between the two buildings

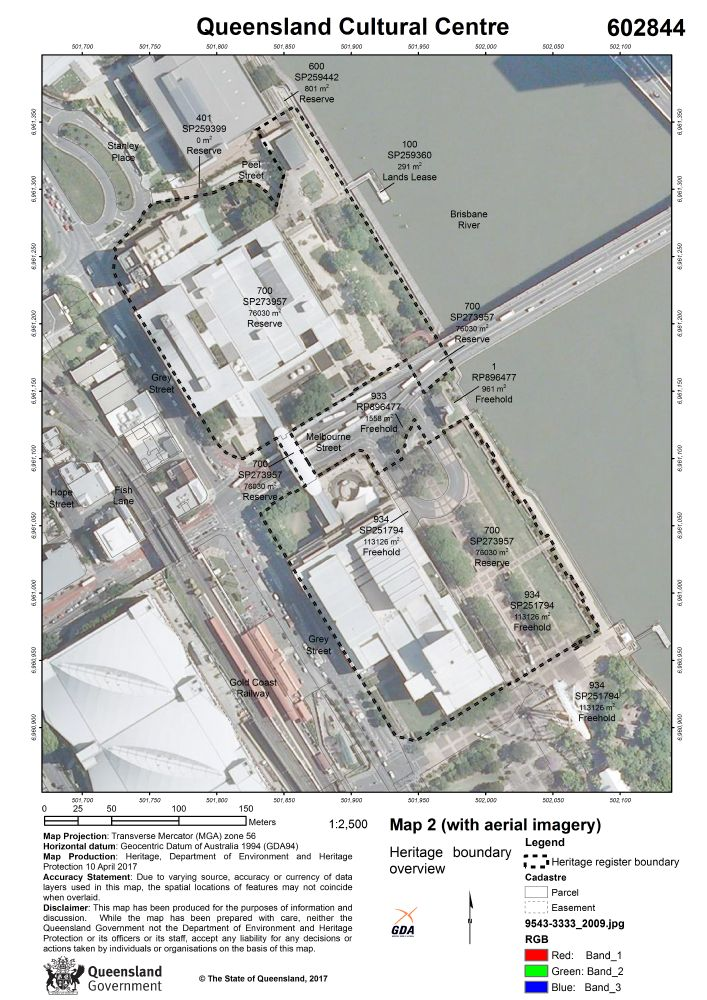
Map showing the extent of the heritage listing, 2017

The Queensland Cultural Centre is a sprawling, low-rise complex of four cultural facilities, associated ancillary facilities and spaces on the banks of the Brisbane River in South Brisbane. Set against the backdrop of the Taylor Range that surrounds Greater Brisbane, the Queensland Art Gallery (QAG), Queensland Performing Arts Centre (QPAC), Queensland Museum (QM), The Edge and central service facility, and connecting plazas and walkways form a coherent architectural form. The revised Queensland State Library (SLQ) building and the Gallery of Modern Art (GOMA) at the western end of the complex are not considered cultural heritage and are not listed on the heritage register.

The site, which extends 450 metres along the river, is bounded by Gray, Peel, and Russell Streets and bisected by Melbourne Street, a major thoroughfare connecting South Brisbane to the CBD on the north shore via the Victoria Bridge. Throughout the site, the centre's components are connected by subway tunnels, outdoor plazas, elevated covered walkways, and a spine bridge over Melbourne Street.

The main circulation between the units is organised around a pedestrian mall that runs from the QPAC across Melbourne Street, between QM and the QAG (known as the Whale Mall), and connects to the common plaza of the SLQ and GOMA.

=== Queensland Performing Arts Centre (QPAC) ===
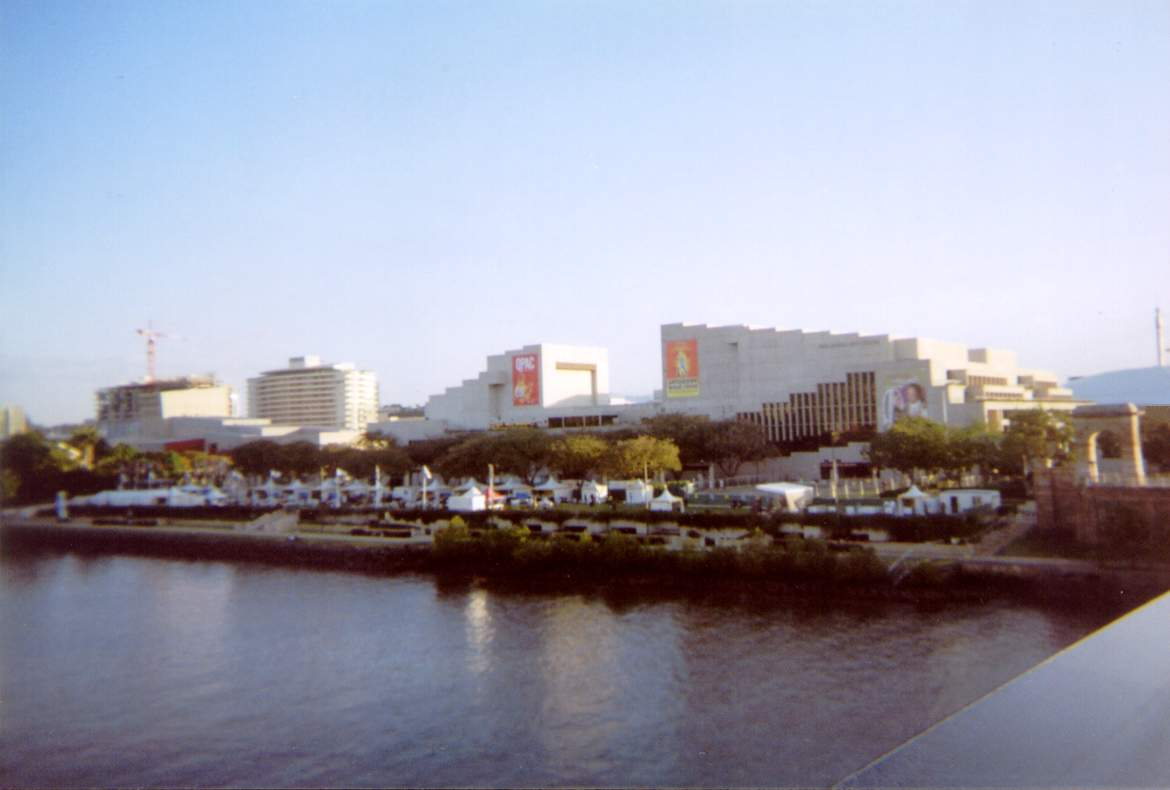
Queensland Performing Arts Centre viewed from Victoria Bridge

The Queensland Performing Arts Centre (QPAC), which is also located at South Bank, and is also part of the Queensland Cultural Centre, was opened in 1985. QPAC contains some of Brisbane's main theatres (Lyric Theatre, Concert Hall, Cremorne Theatre, and the Playhouse), and the Tony Gould Gallery which is operated by the Queensland Museum and displays historical material related to theatre in Queensland. In 2008, the Queensland Government closed QPAC and allocated A$34.7 million for the complete refurbishment of the building under the direction of Cox Rayner Architects. The centre re-opened in 2009.

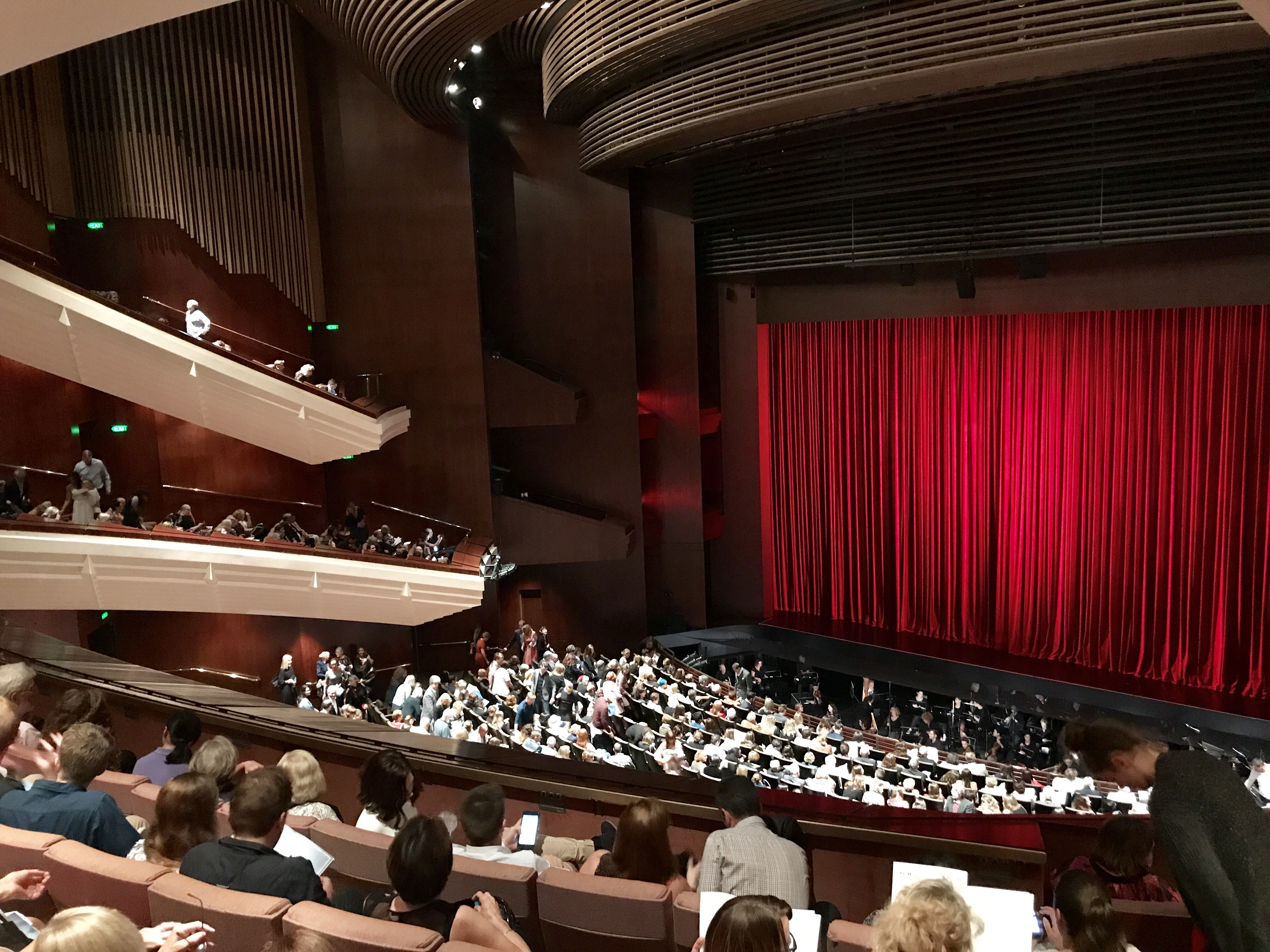
The stage and the stalls seen from the main balcony, Lyric Theatre

The largest single component of the complex is QPAC, located on the south side of Melbourne Street. QPAC includes four venues: the Concert Hall, Lyric Theatre, Cremorne Theatre and Playhouse.

Two courtyards provide a setback from Melbourne Street, one accommodates the large, semi-circular Cascade Court Fountain, the other is landscaped and grassed.

The main entrance is on Melbourne Street and provides access to the Lyric Theatre and Concert Hall; a second entrance on Russell Street leads to the Playhouse; and an entrance in the front courtyard of the Cultural Centre Forecourt provides access to the Cremorne Theatre. The building is designed so that the four venues share a common, central backstage area that is accessed from Gray Street. The "black box" volumes of the venues are enclosed by main foyers facing Melbourne Street and secondary foyers on the sides facing the river and Gray Street.

The multi-story foyers consist of a series of wide stairs leading through a variety of spaces. The large expanses of glass are shaded by vertical concrete ribs supporting horizontal stainless steel grids. These elements cast a bold, graphic pattern of light and shadow into the foyer, enhancing the visual drama during the day. At night, the brightly lit foyers are impressively highlighted by the tall concrete frames and are visible from the surrounding area. A large wall in the grand staircase between the two largest venues prominently displays the Lawrence Daws mural Pacific Nexus. The bars are clad in colourful marble, and the foyers offer attractive views of the river and city, as well as other parts of the QCC.

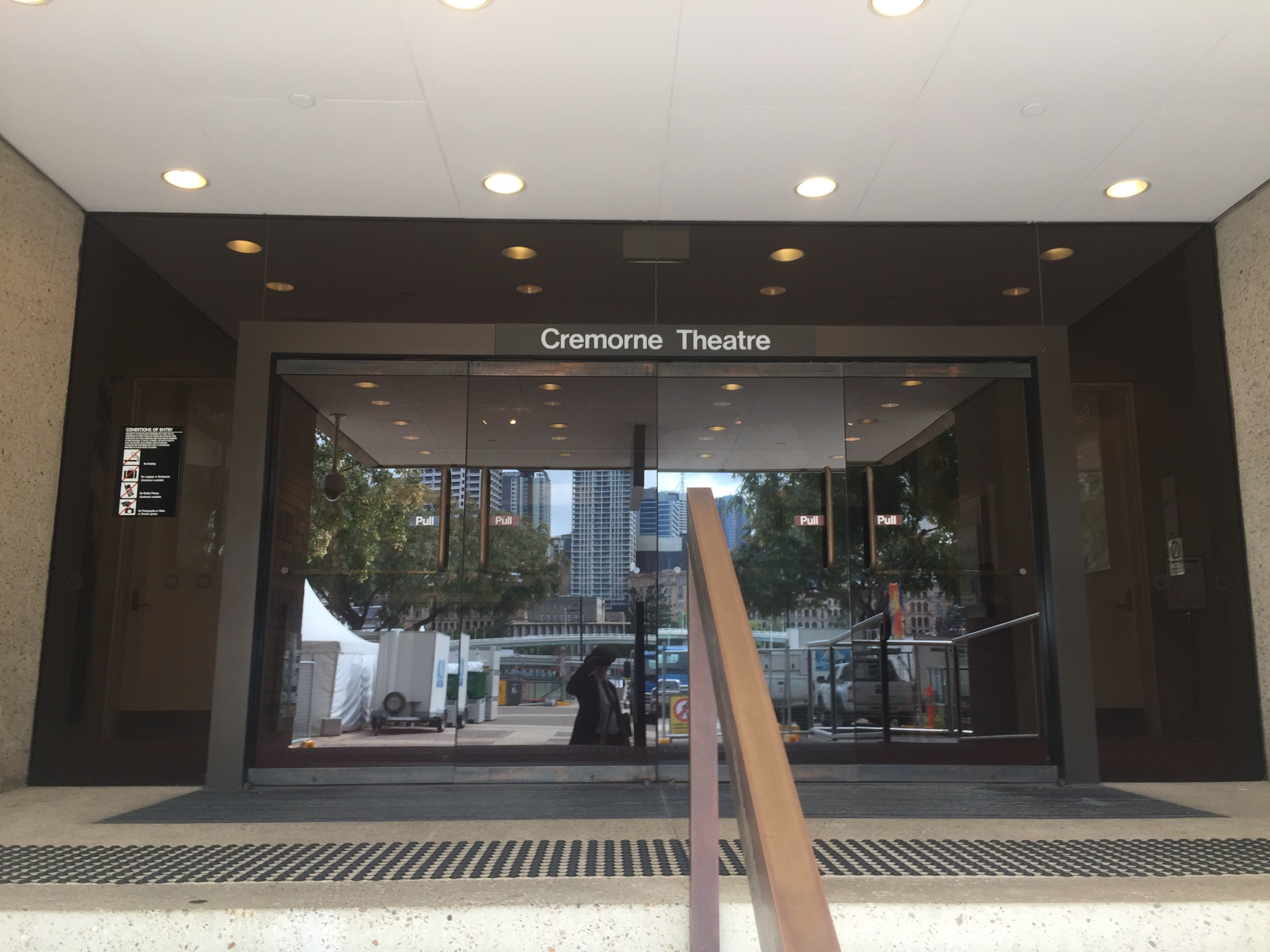
Entrance to the Cremorne Theatre, 2016

The Concert Hall, an auditorium with a capacity of 1,600 to 1,800 seats, is a long "shoe-box" space accommodating a stage, orchestra pit, upholstered stalls seating, a single rear balcony and long side galleries. The auditorium is designed for a long reverberation time, ideal for a big orchestral sound. The space is able to be varied acoustically to give appropriate acoustic definition to other modes of performance. Interior finishes include Johnstone River hardwood flooring and tiers, sand-blasted white concrete and veneered-plywood walls. A white plasterboard coffered ceiling incorporates theatrical lighting pods. The Concert Hall accommodates the Klais Grand Organ with its 6500 pipes arranged symmetrically as a central focus on the rear stage wall.

The Lyric Theatre, an auditorium with a proscenium stage and a seating capacity of 2,000, has an orchestra pit, a stalls and two upper balconies with seating. The space was designed for a medium reverberation time, ideal for opera, but can be acoustically modified for light opera, musicals and dramas through the use of absorber panels in the ceiling. Interior finishes include a colour-graded velour curtain, carpeted floors and tiers, stained veneered plywood wall panels, a lower ceiling of aluminium tubing and an upper ceiling of gypsum board, and upholstered theatre seats.

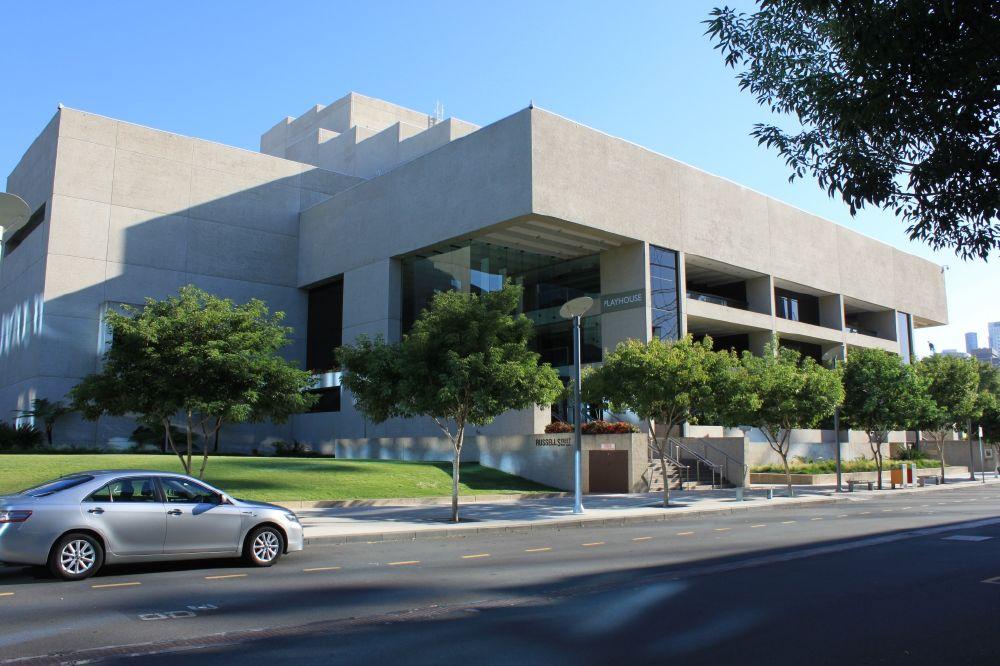
Playhouse Theatre, 2015

The Cremorne Theatre, a flexible space with six configurations and a seating capacity of 200–300, is an apartment-floor auditorium with movable folding rows of seats, movable modular stage elements, an upper wraparound balcony with removable balustrade, lighting bridges, overhead props and lighting grids, and control rooms. The interior design reflects the basic functional aspect of the space: wood flooring, white plasterboard walls and ceilings, padded seating, and dark acoustic curtains on the walls.

The Playhouse, a proscenium theatre with a seating capacity of 850, has a stalls, a centre parquet, a balcony and balcony boxes for audience seating. The foyers face Russell Street and are connected at corners to Stanley Street. There are grand staircases and elevators at both ends and outdoor balconies on both foyer levels.

Ancillary rooms provide front and back of house facilities, restaurants, bars, ticket office, green room, dressing room, rehearsals, administration and storage. The entire building features original furniture and furnishings designed by Robin Gibson and Partners.

=== Queensland Art Gallery (QAG) ===
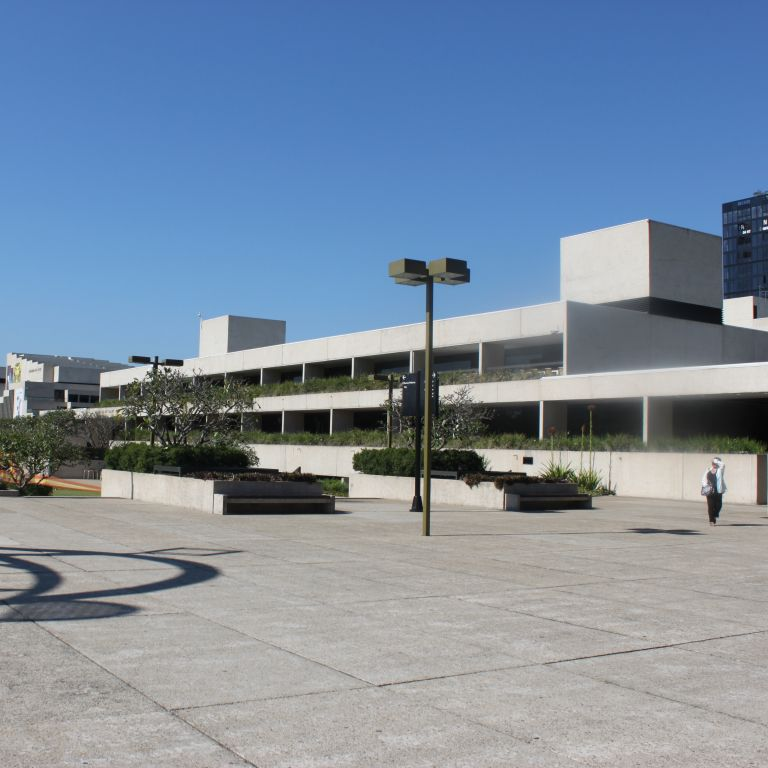
Queensland Art Gallery, as seen from the riverside plaza, 2014

The Queensland Art Gallery (formerly Queensland National Art Gallery), was established in 1895. The gallery had many locations and moved to its present location at the Queensland Cultural Centre in South Bank in 1982. The gallery offers 4,700 square feet of exhibition space and includes a water mall, fountains, water sculptures, an outdoor area and gardens.

The Queensland Art Gallery, a three-story building with extensive landscaped plazas and gardens, stands on the north side of Melbourne Street and northeast of the Whale Mall pedestrian mall. Over two levels of parking (Levels 1 and 2), the building houses two floors of public exhibition galleries and associated administrative offices (Levels 3 and 4) and one floor of administrative offices, art conservation workshops, and collections storage (Level 5).

The building and its plazas/gardens are integrated: large internal galleries are visibly connected to the external sculpture gardens, and planter boxes are integrated into the structure internally and externally. On the river side of the QAG is a large landscaped plaza with apartment lawns, raised concrete beds, and rectangular concrete slabs that slope down to the river in a steep landscaped embankment. The plazas/gardens include sculptures and fountains by major Australian artists such as Approaching Equilibrium (Anthony Pryoro), Pelicans (Leonard and Kathleen Shillam), Sisters (Ante Dabro), Leviathan Play (Rob Robertson-Swann), and Offshoot (Clement Meadmore).

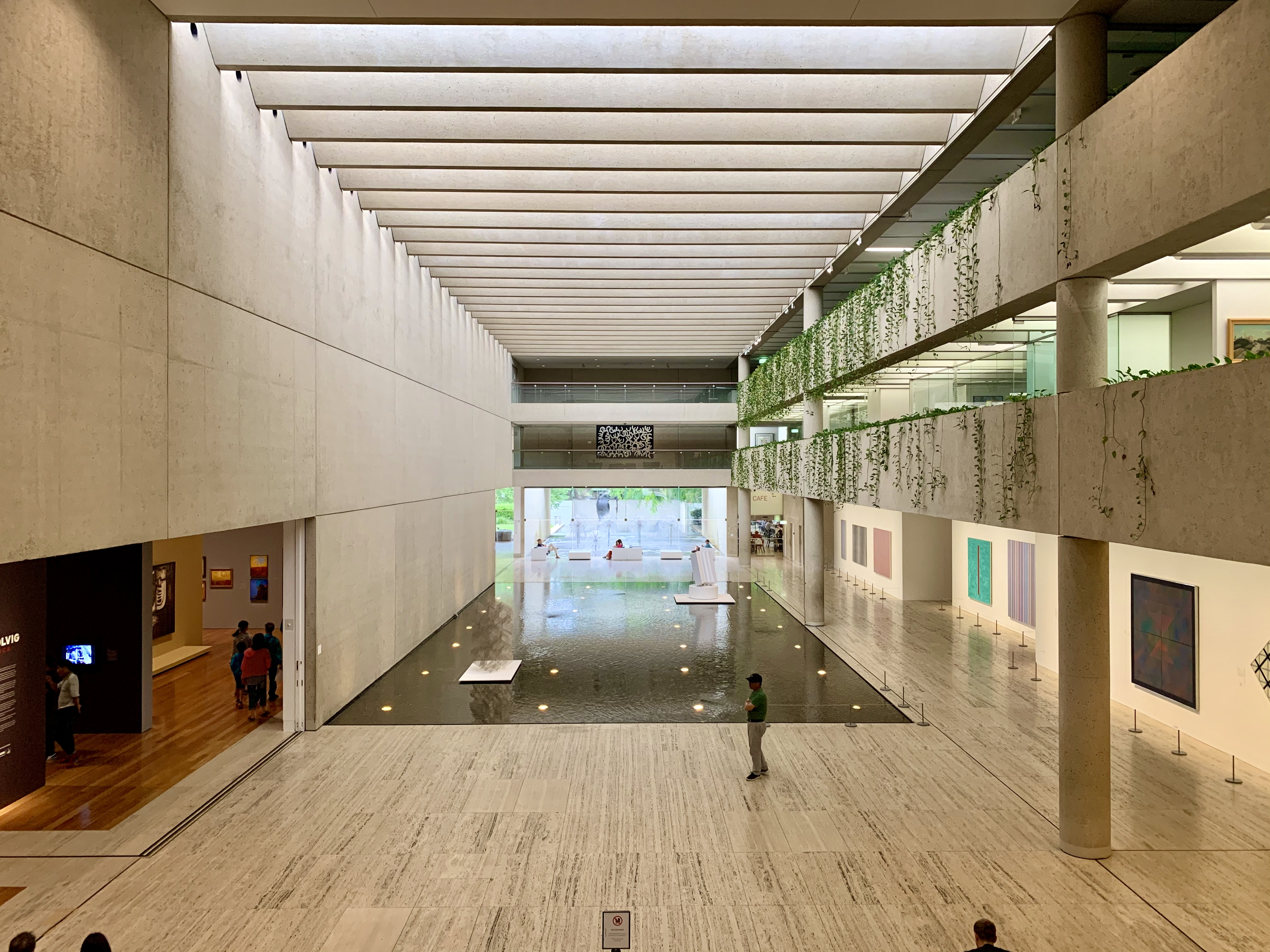
Water mall, Queensland Art Gallery, 2019

The original main entrance to the gallery is on the waterfront. An entrance on the southeast corner is the main access for pedestrians coming from the city across the Victoria Bridge. The "Robin Gibson Entry," a curved glass structure that opens from SLQ/GOMA Plaza, is now the main entrance. Upon entering the building, visitors are drawn to the central orientation area, the Watermall.

The colour and material palette of the gallery is restrained and consists mainly of white-painted concrete coffered ceilings and plasterboard walls, large-scale sand-coloured concrete walls and travertine floors. The different floor coverings are important to the function of the galleries: large areas in the general access areas are covered with large travertine slabs; travertine also runs in narrow bands along the walls to prevent the paintings from touching; there is a lot of wood flooring. The building has original furniture designed by Robin Gibson and Partners.

=== Queensland Museum (QM) ===
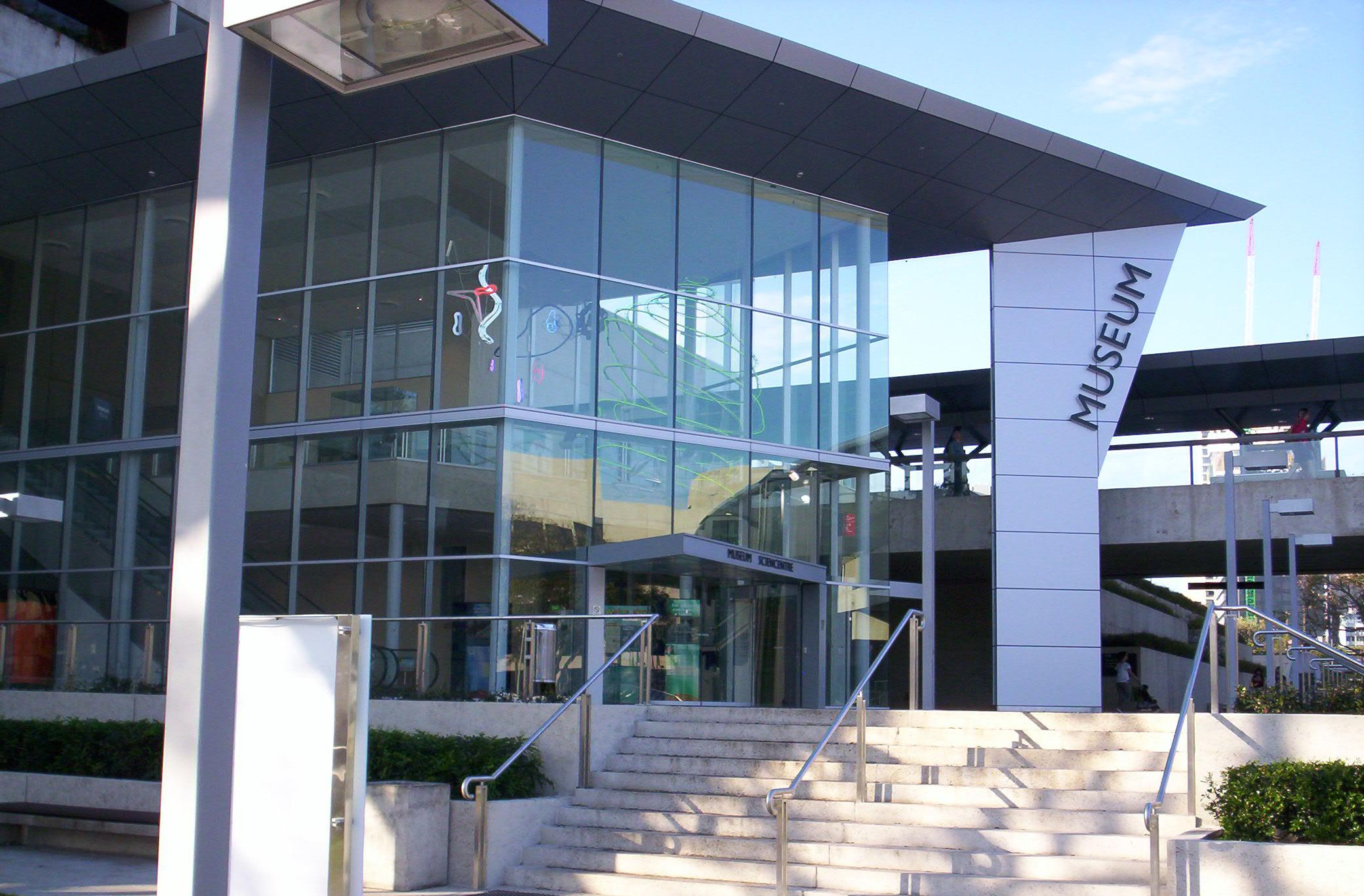
Queensland Museum and Sciencentre main entrance with pedestrian bridge (right)

The Queensland Museum was established in 1862, and has had many homes, including The Old Windmill (1862–1869) – Parliament House (1869–1873) – General Post Office (1873–1879) – followed by being based at a building on William Street, which was later home to John Oxley Library (1879–1899) – the Exhibition Hall, now called the Old Museum Building (1899–1986). The Queensland Museum moved to the Queensland Cultural Centre on the South Bank in 1986 and has an area of 6,500 square metres (70,000 sq ft). In addition to the main museum area, the building also houses the Queensland Sciencentre, a permanent interactive science exhibition suitable for people of all ages. It plays an important role in educating people about new developments in science.

The Queensland Museum stands on the north side of Melbourne Street and southwest of the pedestrian Whale Mall. It is a seven-story building that houses four levels of public exhibition space, administrative and research offices, a library, and collections storage.

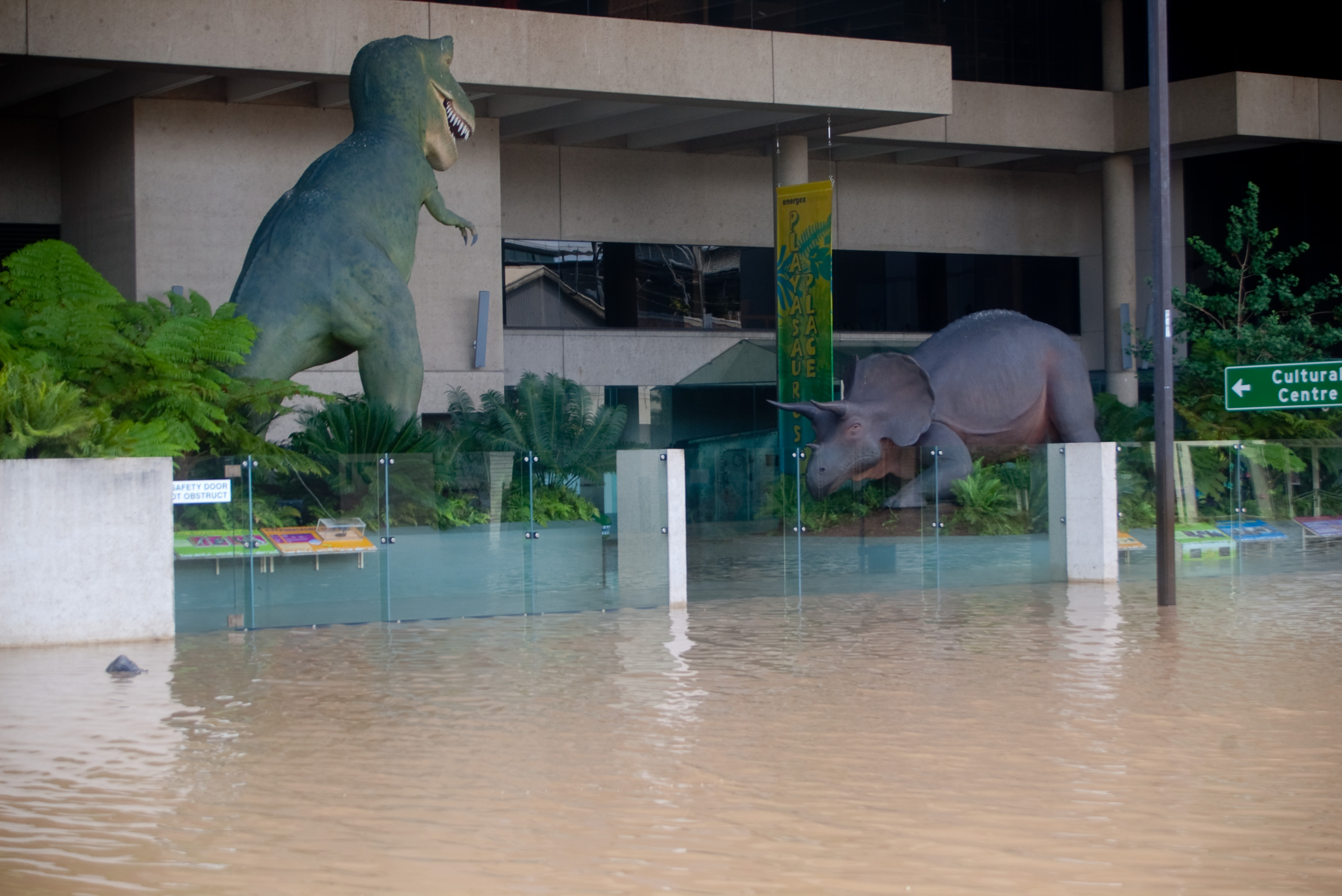
Queensland Museum garden, during the 2011 Brisbane floods

The monolithic square building is a closed box that provides a controlled climate for the exhibits. A large, deep opening is cut into the solid concrete wall on Gray Street and houses a dramatic, three-story garden. The other facades are generally massive. A forecourt facing Melbourne Street with a wide concrete stair forms the main entrance to the building. A prominent, glazed, double-height escalator hall projects from the façade and leads up to the large main foyer on Level 2.

The floor plan consists of large open floor plates on either side of a wide central spine of vertical circulation, interstitial spaces and service areas. The exhibition levels are stepped halfway up each other on either side of the spine, allowing visitors to orient themselves and experience the exhibits in sequence. The exhibit spaces vary in size to accommodate a range of exhibit sizes. Offices on Levels 5 and 6 have access to generous garden balconies on the northeast side overlooking the lower QAG and Brisbane River.

Accessed from Grey Street is an open-air loading dock, shared with QAG.

=== Ancillary services plant ===
Adjacent to QM is a tall, freestanding outbuilding that houses a service facility that provides common mechanical services for the entire QCC.

=== Cultural Centre Forecourt ===
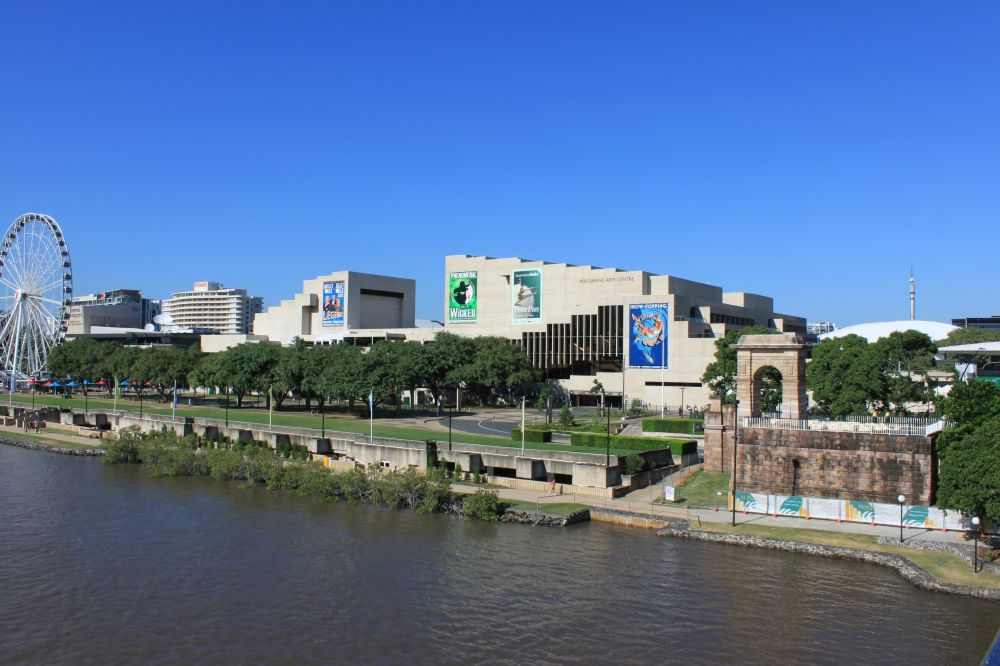
Cultural forecourt, as seen from Victoria Bridge, 2015

The Cultural Centre forecourt is an apartment, open, landscaped plaza along the riverfront on the southeast side of the QPAC. The forecourt provides access to the Cremorne Theatre and other functions of the QPAC, as well as to the underground parking garage below; the adjacent street leads to the underground parking garage below the QAG.

=== Pedestrian spine including the Whale Mall ===
A wide, concrete pedestrian plaza extends from the Melbourne Street entrance of the QPAC, bridges Melbourne Street, runs between QM and QAG, and opens into the common plaza of SLQ and GOMA. Between QM and QAG, it forms a large axial spine known as Whale Mall, encompassing a large-volume space lit by barrel-vaulted skylights, housing slot windows to QAG and secondary entrances to QM.

=== The Edge, the former Fountain Room ===
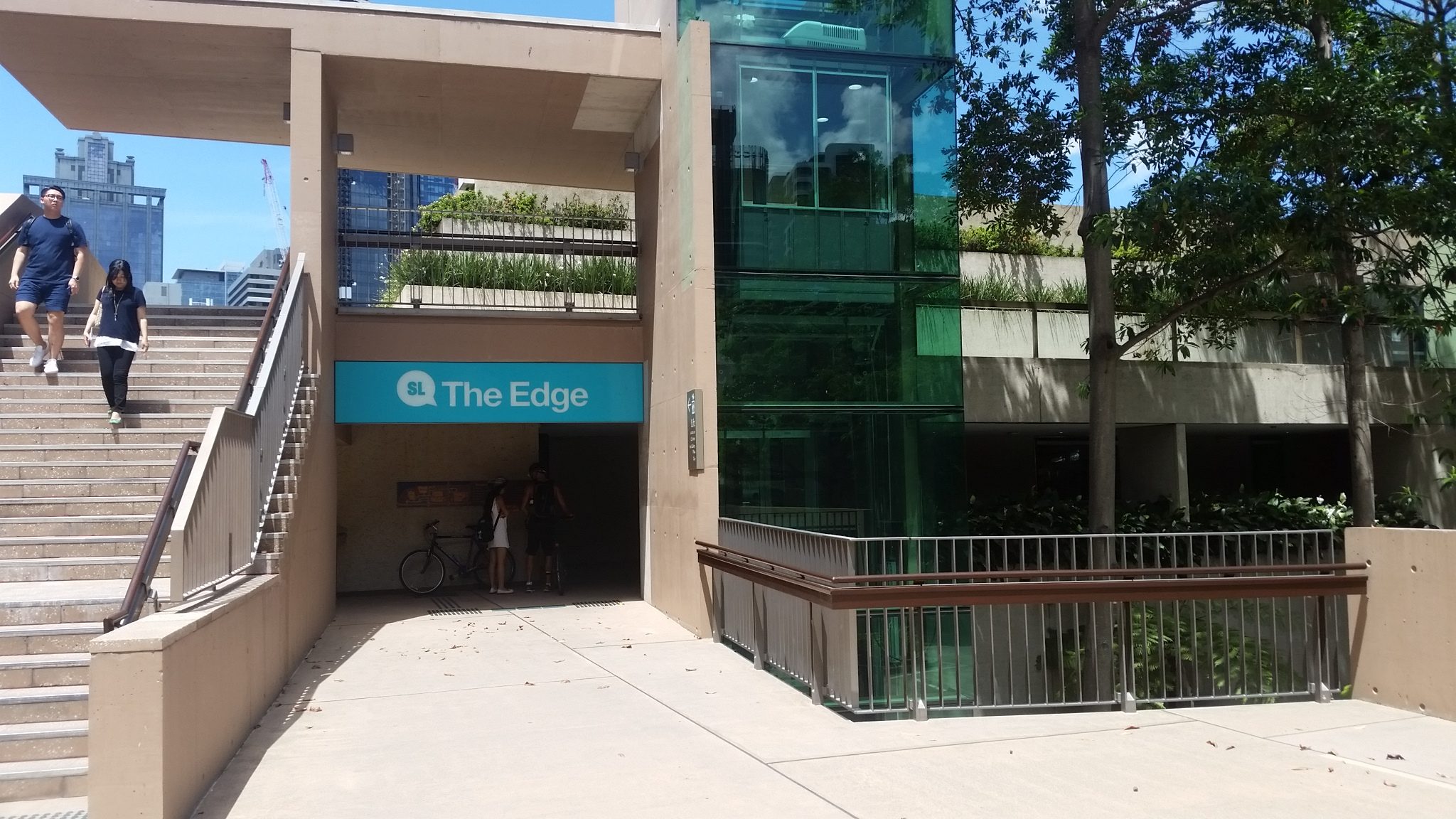
Entrance to The Edge, 2017

The former Fountain Room, which became known as The Edge in 2015, is a three-story rectangular building measuring approximately 30 by 15 metres that sits directly on the river. Pedestrian walkways connect the building to the shared plaza with the SLQ to the northwest and the riverfront QAG plaza to the south, providing access to the middle and upper levels of The Edge; the upper walkway is lit by square openings to the sky. The interior of the building retains traces of the original interior. The middle level houses a large, double-height auditorium; a smaller auditorium on the upper level opens to an exterior gathering space. The gathering space consists of an apartment lawn surrounded by a concrete planting bed with balustrades and rectangular concrete slabs.

=== State Library of Queensland ===
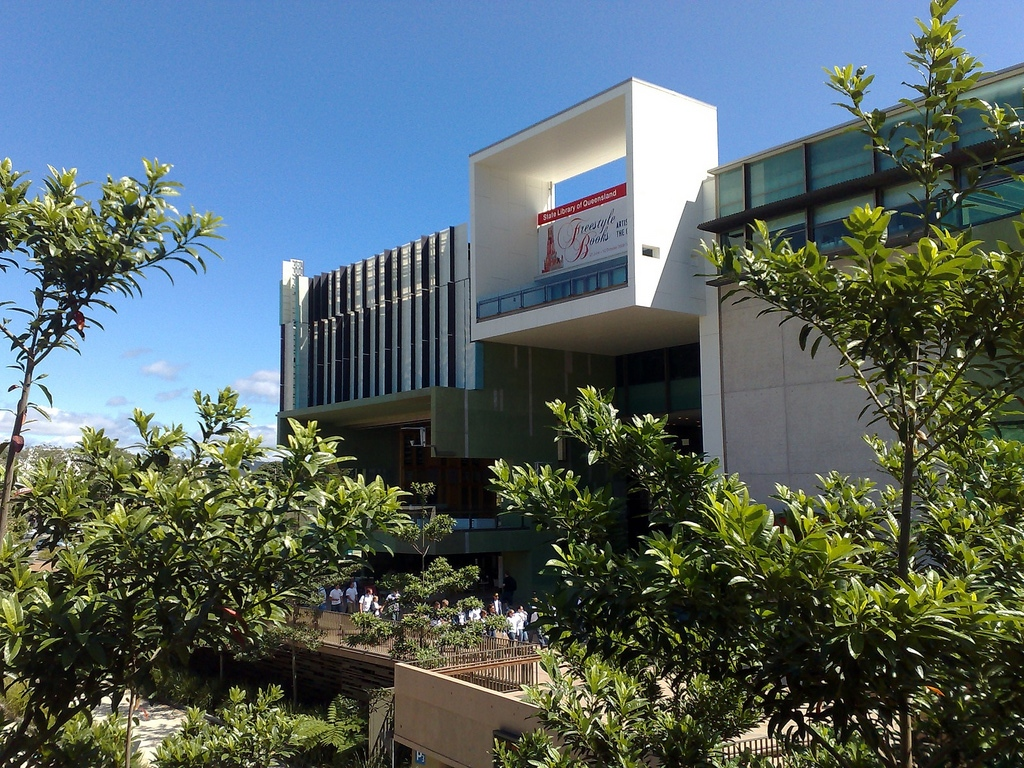
State Library of Queensland, 2008

Established in 1896 and originally called the Public Library of Queensland, it was renamed the State Library of Queensland in 1902 was established in 1896. It has been housed in many locations throughout its history, including a long time in a building on William Street (1899–1988). It then moved to its current location near the Queensland Museum and Queensland Art Gallery, as part of the Queensland Cultural Centre. In 2006, the State Library underwent major renovations at its South Bank address and reopened in December of that year. Along with the usual facilities of a library, the building contains an historical archive called the John Oxley Library, several galleries in which exhibitions are held throughout the year, lecture rooms and an Indigenous Knowledge Centre called kuril dhagun. A kuril is a native marsupial and dhagun means "meeting place". Therefore, the literal meaning is "kuril's place". This kuril dhagun is part of a Queensland-wide network of research facilities serving the needs of Indigenous Australians (the Aboriginal Australians and the Torres Strait Islanders).

=== Queensland Gallery of Modern Art ===
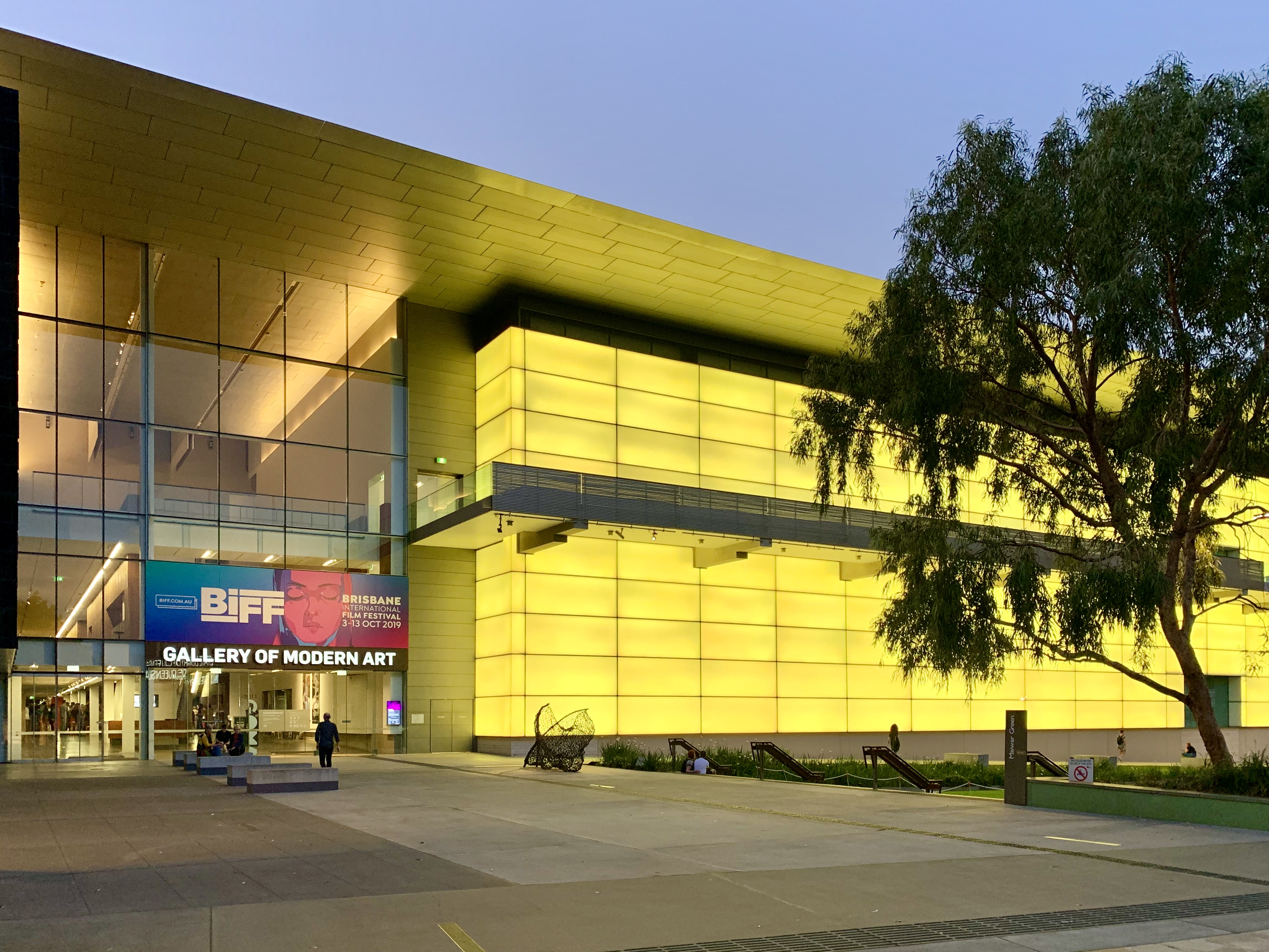
Queensland Gallery of Modern Art main entrance

The Queensland Gallery of Modern Art, which operates in association with the Queensland Art Gallery, was built at Kurilpa Point, upstream from the rest of the centre and near the William Jolly Bridge. It opened in December 2006. In addition to the display areas, it contains the Australian Cinémathèque which has two cinemas and the Children's Art Centre in which children are able to interact with the galleries collection. In 2007 a three manual 15 rank Wurlitzer Style 260 theatre organ, Opus 2040, originally installed in the Brisbane's Regent Theatre was restored by the Queensland Art Gallery with financial assistance from the Queensland Art Gallery Foundation and installed in the Cinémathèque Cinema 2. The instrument is now being used regularly for the presentation of silent movies and for recitals.

=== Pedestrian bridge ===
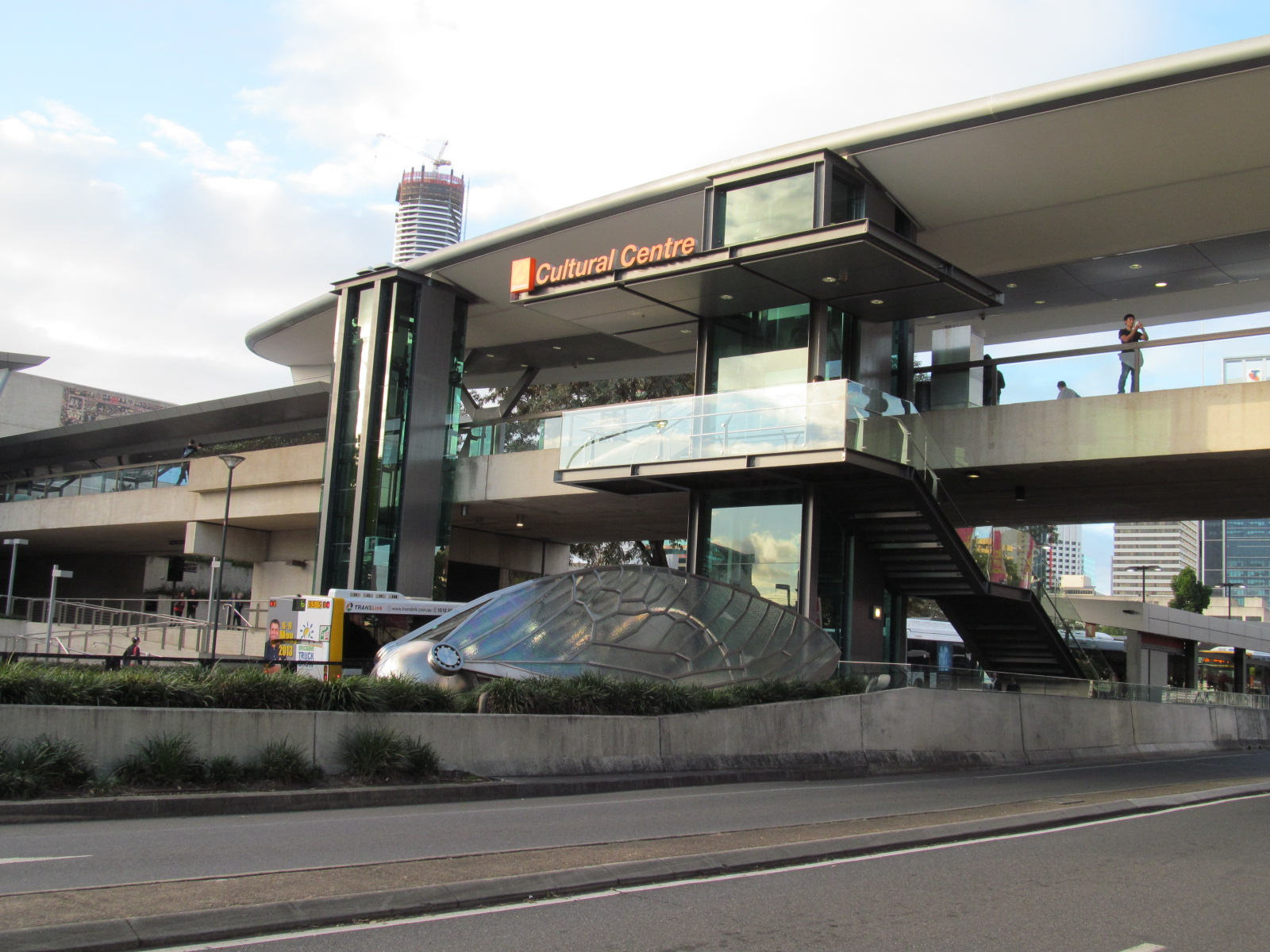
Pedestrian bridge over Melbourne Street and the Cultural Centre busway

The buildings of the Queensland Cultural Centre are connected by a pedestrian bridge over the Cultural Centre busway station. This bridge connects the Queensland Performing Arts Centre across Melbourne Street to the building housing both the Queensland Museum and the Queensland Art Gallery, and provides easy access to busses at the Cultural Centre Busway Station.

== Awards ==
In 2010, Robin Gibson and Partners were granted a "25 Year Award for Enduring Architecture" by the Queensland Chapter of the Australian Institute of Architects (AIA).

The GOMA building designed by Kerry and Lindsay Clare, directors of the Australasian firm Architectus, was added to the complex in 2006. In 2007, the building received three awards: a Brisbane Commendation and a Public Architecture Award from the Queensland Chapter of AIA, and a National Award for Public Architecture, also from AIA. Then in 2010, the Clares received the AIA's Gold Medal for their work.

In the same year, an extension of the SLQ building designed by the Brisbane architects Donovan Hill and Peddle Thorp was opened. For their design, the architects were awarded the prestigious Sir Zelman Cowen Award for Public Architecture by AIA in 2007.

== Heritage listing ==
Queensland Cultural Centre was listed on the Queensland Heritage Register on 12 June 2015 having satisfied the following criteria.

Since its opening, the QCC facilities have played a dominant role in promoting and enabling cultural and artistic activities in Queensland through performances, exhibitions, collections and events. The complex's purpose-built facilities have enabled Queensland to host national and international performances, events and exhibitions, and to expand and display collections in ways not previously possible. In addition to the QCC's artistic endeavors, the Queensland Museum's role in scientific disciplines is also an important activity. The QCC (as part of the larger Cultural Precinct) is a major visitor destination in Brisbane; millions of people from Queensland and elsewhere have visited.

The successful development of the Cultural Centre was the catalyst for the broader renewal of South Brisbane along the Brisbane River. In 1983 Queensland won the right to hold the 1988 World Expo (Expo 88). The site for Expo 88 was directly adjacent to the Cultural Centre and underwent a major transformation to host the event. Robin Gibson designed the Queensland Pavilion. Expo 88 was a highly successful for Brisbane and Queensland. After Expo, the site was again comprehensively redeveloped, opening in 1992 as the South Bank Parklands, now a major public space in Brisbane. In the immediate South Bank area there are restaurants, bars, parklands, walking paths, and swimming pools, the Queensland Conservatorium Griffith University, the Australian Broadcasting Corporation's new radio and television headquarters which also house the Queensland Symphony Orchestra, and the Brisbane Convention & Exhibition Centre. With South Brisbane Railway Station directly opposite QPAC, many major bus routes running past the centre, and water transport available along the Brisbane River, the public has ready access to the precinct.

More widely, the Cultural Centre's direct relationship with the Brisbane River influenced the way the city has come to engage with its dominant natural feature along its edges.

The place is important in demonstrating the evolution or pattern of Queensland's history.

The Queensland Cultural Centre is of outstanding importance to the cultural and social development of Queensland in the late 20th century. It was originally built in stages from 1976 to 1988. The consolidation of the state's major cultural institutions into one complex was an important milestone in the development of Queensland's history. In its form, function, and use, the Cultural Centre demonstrates that the government has supported the development of the arts on a scale and at a level unprecedented in Queensland's history.

The Cultural Centre is important in illustrating the development of architecture in Queensland. Designed by Robin Gibson OAM (1930–2014), an important Australian architect of his time, it is an exceptional example of late 20th century international style. Century. By integrating building and landscape, the Cultural Centre illustrates the evolution of landscape design in Queensland.

The Cultural Centre is an important example in Queensland of a major urban renewal project of the late 20th century. The development and completion of the Cultural Centre dramatically altered the existing built environment of South Brisbane and was a catalyst for the consolidated regeneration of the entire area, particularly through the revitalization of the adjacent Expo '88 site, later redeveloped as South Bank.

The place demonstrates rare, uncommon or endangered aspects of Queensland's cultural heritage.

The Queensland Cultural Centre is unique in that it is the first and only place built specifically to house Queensland's major cultural institutions in one complex.

Retaining a high degree of integrity and integrity, the Cultural Centre is an architecturally unique complex in Queensland, distinguished by its distinctive and ubiquitous design features, its size and scale, and its relationship to the Brisbane River.

The place is important in demonstrating the principal characteristics of a particular class of cultural places.

The purpose-built Queensland Cultural Centre is an important example of the key features of a cultural complex. Easily accessible from the central business district, the Cultural Centre is located in a prominent location adjacent to and connected with the river. The centre combines an art gallery, a museum, a performing arts complex and related ancillary facilities on a site connected by plazas and boulevards, and stands out for its functionality, planning and execution.

The Cultural Centre is an architectural landmark that, by its prominent position in the capital, emphasizes its function as the most important cultural complex in the country. The monumental size and form of the centre underscores the importance of its cultural, educational and social role as a venue for high profile cultural events in Queensland.

The Cultural Centre is an exceptional, intact example of Robin Gibson's work and an important example of the key features of his work. Chief among these are: the integration of the building and its surroundings, coherent, simple, low and horizontal forms, clean lines, and a limited palette of materials (high quality concrete, tinted glass, and bronze metalwork).

The place is important because of its aesthetic significance.

The Queensland Cultural Centre is of outstanding esthetic significance to the state because of its distinctive architectural qualities, monumental size, prominent location, and numerous public art installations. These qualities make it a popular tourist destination and an inspiration for photographers and artists.

This is a large complex of buildings and spaces unified by its cubic forms, structural details, and high-quality finishes, fixtures, and furnishings. The usage of white, sandblasted concrete throughout the complex, both interior and exterior, is of a scale unique to Queensland.

The juxtaposition of intimate spaces and large volumes and the many contemplative and restful indoor and outdoor spaces, especially the waterfront promenade extending through the art gallery, and the harmonization of the limited landscaping with the architectural design, contribute significantly to the esthetic value of the centre.

The Cultural Centre is a landmark in the capital city and is set against the backdrop of the Taylor Range, which surrounds outer Brisbane. The open spaces between the river and the cultural facilities, the forecourt, and the plazas contribute to the landmark quality of the complex and provide views to and from the river, the Victoria Bridge, the central business district, and the surrounding streets in South Brisbane.

The place is important in demonstrating a high degree of creative or technical achievement at a particular period.

The Queensland Cultural Centre is an architectural vision that seeks to create a unified landmark complex for Queensland's major cultural institutions. The Queensland Cultural Centre integrates building and landscape, combining of vegetation and water elements used both internally and externally to balance and soften the rectilinear geometry of the buildings.

The place has a strong or special association with a particular community or cultural group for social, cultural or spiritual reasons.

The Queensland Cultural Centre has outstanding social value to the Queensland community as the seat and physical embodiment of its principal cultural institutions.

Built for the people of Queensland and visited by millions annually, its continued use as a cultural centre is a key aspect of its significance. The strong connection between the Queensland community and the institutions of the Cultural Centre, both individually and collectively, comes through the experience of the site, its environment, the interconnected buildings, the internal and external spaces and venues, and the events, exhibitions, performances and activities offered in the complex. An important element is the use of the cultural centre as a popular social space and meeting place, as well as the use of the outdoor spaces for public engagement.

As the state's premier arts complex and a major venue for events, exhibitions, performances, activities and collections, the Cultural Centre is uniquely connected to the Queensland arts community.

The place has a special association with the life or work of a particular person, group or organization of importance in Queensland's history.

The Queensland Cultural Centre is particularly associated with the life and work of architect Robin Gibson OAM (1930–2014), who made an outstanding and influential contribution to the development of Queensland's built environment in the late 20th century. Gibson's achievements have been recognised by numerous awards, including: Queenslander of the Year (1982); Sir Zelman Cowen Award (for Public Buildings) for the Queensland Art Gallery (1982); Royal Australian Institute of Architecture (RAIA) Gold Medal for Outstanding Achievement and Contribution (1989); and the 25-year Enduring Architecture award (2010). The Centre is considered Gibson's most important project and embodies the crucial modernist architectural principles he developed and applied throughout his architectural career.

The Queensland Cultural Centre has a special relationship with the Queensland Museum, the Queensland Art Gallery, the Queensland Performing Arts Centre and the State Library of Queensland, institutions that have made and continue to make an important contribution to the cultural development of Queensland.

== See also ==
- Arts and culture in Brisbane
