= Barclay Mowlem =

Australian construction company

- Formerly: Barclays Bros
- Industry: Construction
- Founded: 1957
- Founder: Don Barclay; Ian Barclay
- Defunct: 2006
- Headquarters: Brisbane, Australia
- Area served: Australia; South East Asia
- Revenue: $893 million (2003)
- Operating income: $26 million (2003)
- Number of employees: 2,000 (2001)
- Parent: Mowlem
- Website: www.barclaymowlem.com.au

Barclay Mowlem was an Australian construction company that traded from 1957 until 2006.

== History ==
Barclay Bros was established in 1957 in Brisbane by brothers Don and Ian Barclay. The company grew to become one of the largest construction firms in Queensland, Australia. In 1958, it expanded internationally by securing a contract to construct a hospital in Madang, Papua New Guinea. In 1971, British construction firm John Mowlem & Co. acquired a 40% stake in the company, later increasing its ownership to 100%. Barclay Bros subsequently expanded its operations across all mainland Australian states, with the exception of South Australia, as well as into Asia.

In 1985, Barclay Bros merged with Roberts Construction, resulting in the formation of one of the top five construction companies in Australia. The company was rebranded as Barclay Mowlem in 1988.

In December 2005, Barclay Mowlem became part of the acquisition of its parent company, Mowlem, by Carillion. As Carillion did not maintain any other operations in Australia, it offered Barclay Mowlem for sale. The business was acquired by Laing O'Rourke in July 2006, after which the Barclay Mowlem brand was retired.

== Notable projects ==
Notable projects completed by Barclay Mowlem included:

- Houghton Highway Bridge, completed in 1979
- Queensland Performing Arts Centre, completed in 1985
- Brisbane Airport domestic terminal, completed in 1987
- 111 George Street, completed in 1993
- Woronora River Bridge, completed in 2001
- Alice Springs to Darwin railway as part of a consortium with John Holland, Kellogg Brown & Root and Macmahon, completed in 2004
- Joondalup line extension from Currambine to Clarkson, completed in 2004
- Sea Cliff Bridge, completed in 2005
- Taiwan High Speed Rail depot and track laying as part of a consortium with Fu Tsu Construction, Heitkamp Rail, Hsin Lung Construction and Leighton Asia, completed in 2005
- Thornlie railway station, completed in 2005

At the time of its sale to Laing O'Rourke, Barclay Mowlem was involved in the construction of the Chatswood Transport Interchange and Fortescue railway.
