= Robin Gibson (architect) =

Australian architect (1930–2014)

Robert (Robin) Findlay Gibson AO
- Born: 15 May 1930; Brisbane, Australia
- Died: 28 March 2014 (aged 83); Brisbane, Australia
- Other name: Robin Gibson
- Citizenship: Australian
- Education: University of Queensland
- Occupation: Architect
- Years active: 1954—2013
- Known for: Public buildings including museums, galleries, libraries and theatres
- Awards: Australian Institute of Architects Gold Medal

Robin Gibson AO (15 May 1930 – 28 March 2014) was an Australian architect, from Brisbane, Queensland.

== Personal life ==
Robert Findlay ('Robin') Gibson was born in Brisbane in 1930, and attended the Yeronga State School and Brisbane State High School. He studied architecture at the University of Queensland, and graduated with a Diploma of Architecture in 1954 (at that time, the Diploma was the professional qualification). During his part-time years in university, he worked in a number of architectural offices in Brisbane and, in particular, gained much knowledge from the progressive firm Hayes and Scott. After graduating, Gibson moved to London and worked with the practices of James Cubitt, Sir Hugh Casson and his partner Neville Conder. When Gibson was in London, he traveled across Europe and became interested in modern architecture.

On his return to Brisbane in 1957, Gibson established his own practice. Most of his major projects are in Queensland, with the exception of the Belconnen Library in Canberra, Australian Capital Territory. He died at the age of 83 in March 2014.

== Philosophy ==
According to an article in Architecture Australia magazine in 1989, Gibson was devoted to raising people's consciousness of the responsibilities of the architectural act. The writer added that Gibson took into consideration the political, social and cultural needs of the environment, and embraced awareness of the outcomes in global arenas. Gibson was quoted as saying this was 'the opportunity to create something better than what exists at present'. Gibson described his philosophy that 'a good building is one that respects its users and accommodates the needs of those outside its walls', and that the aim of architecture is to 'house and magnify the experience of living'.

== Robin Gibson & Partners ==
Robin Gibson and Partners was a Brisbane-based architectural practice, formed by Gibson in 1957. In April 1973 it won a two-stage design competition for a new Queensland Art Gallery in South Brisbane. Later, Gibson's commission expanded to the design of the whole of the current Queensland Cultural Centre at South Bank, that also included the Queensland Performing Arts Complex, the Queensland Museum and the State Library of Queensland. The company was registered at the Office of Fair Trading in Queensland in 1994, and closed in May 2013, due to Gibson's ill health.

== Notable projects ==
Queensland Cultural Centre (1982)

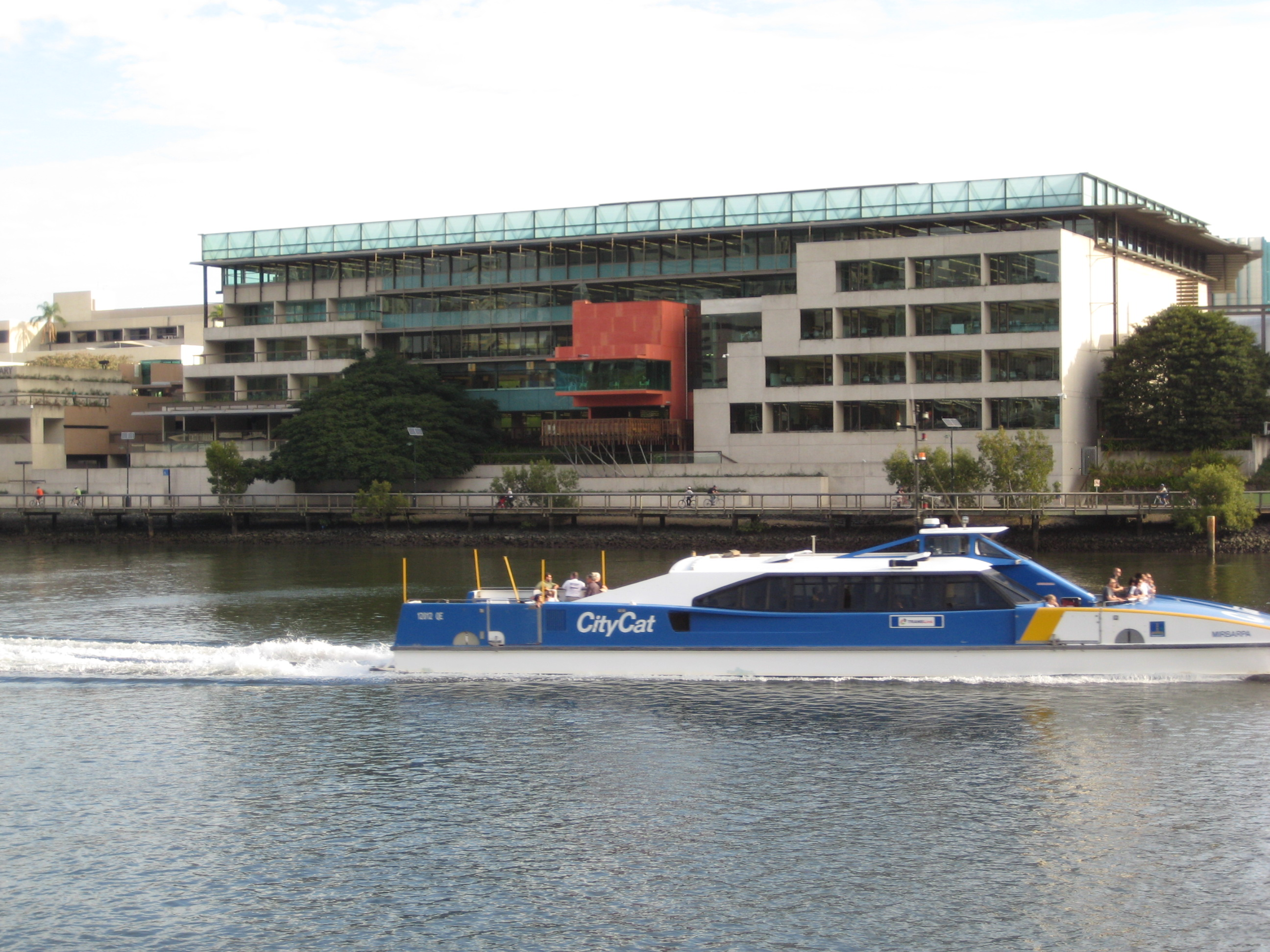
State Library of Queensland

The concept of educating people about culture influenced the Queensland Government to develop the Queensland Cultural Centre (QCC). The centre was made to create easy access and connection for pedestrians, and to help them be more involved with every part of the site. It consists four parts: the Queensland Art Gallery, the Queensland Museum, the State Library of Queensland and the Performing Arts Complex (now Queensland Performing Arts Centre). These original buildings of the Queensland Cultural Centre designed by Gibson, were recognised by the Queensland Heritage Council on 12 June 2015 for their cultural heritage significance.

Queensland Art Gallery (1975)

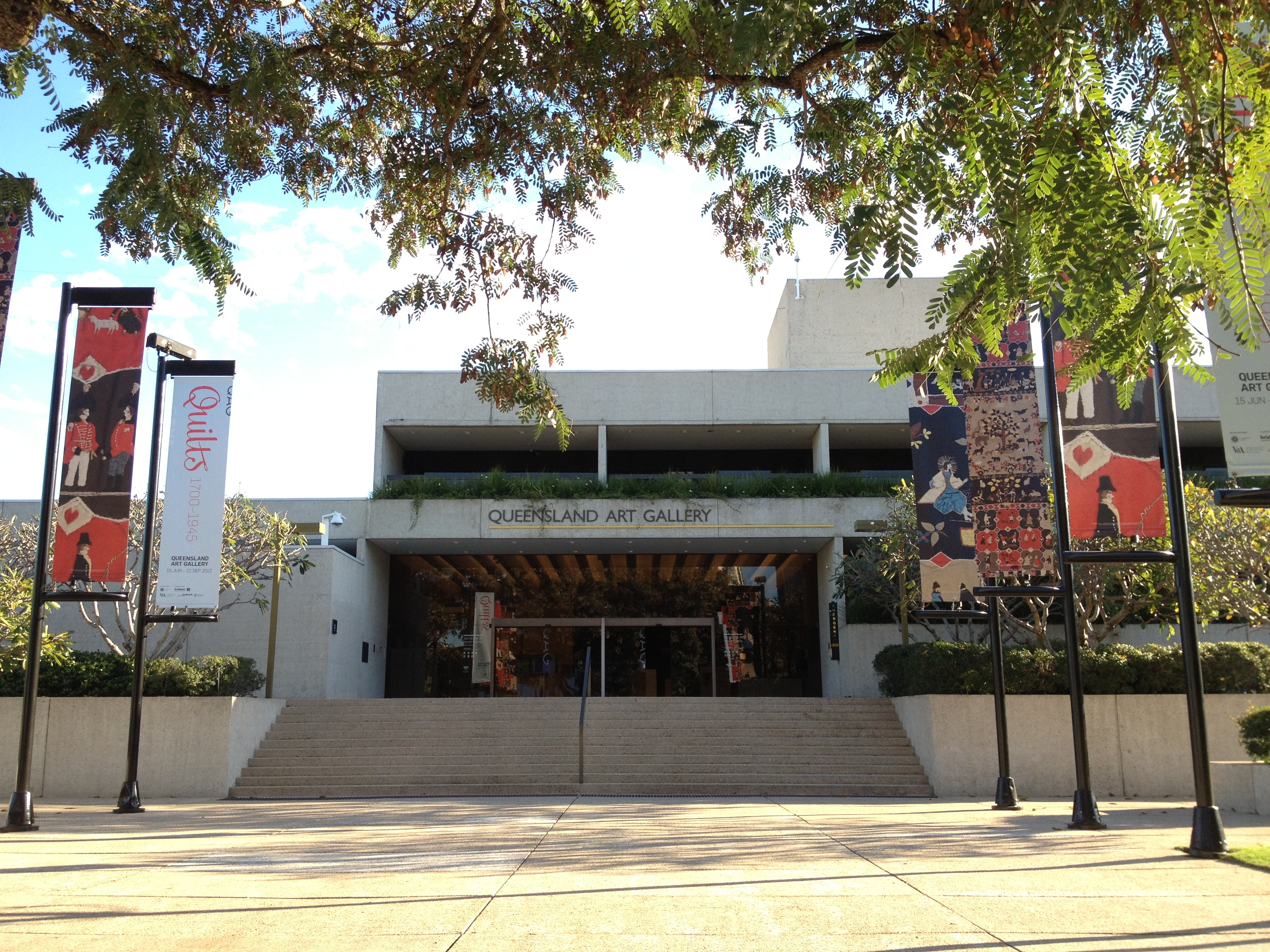
Queensland Art Gallery

The Queensland Art Gallery was the first stage of the Queensland Cultural Centre. It has five levels with 15,477 areas in total. In the Gallery, visitors encounter different spaces and views. Its external walkways link with the Queensland Museum and the Queensland Performing Arts Centre. A striking feature of the Gallery's interior is the Water Mall, acting as the main orientation element in the building. The Water Mall also serves as a parallel reflection of the river. The water and the natural light from the acrylic domes at the top lend a sub-tropical character to the interior space.

Queensland Performing Arts Centre (1986)

The Queensland Performing Arts Centre (formerly Performing Arts Complex) consists of three different areas: The Lyric Theatre, The Cremorne Theatre and The Concert Hall. It comprises the second stage of the Queensland Cultural Centre development. The smallest venue among these buildings is the Cremorne Theatre. The Concert Hall was designed as a classical hall to equip a concert grand organ that serves 2000 people. Similar to the Lyric Theatre, it can also house 2000 people. The orchestra pit can hold musicians with a full stage house facility that caters to performances from dramas to grand opera. Later in 1997, the Playhouse Theatre was built. This addition to the complex is an 850-seat traditional proscenium theatre.

Mayne Hall, University of Queensland (1972)

The Mayne Hall building was built in 1972. The concept is to transform the hall into a multipurpose space that is suitable for all occasions. There is an abstract design by Nevil Matthews done on six large stained glass windows, which form the eastern facade of the foyer. In addition, there are paintings and sculptures reflecting the history of the university, lined on the north main walkway along the tall concrete recesses.

Brisbane: Arcade and Square (1982)

Since Brisbane sees the need to minimise high-rise buildings in the area, the Riverside Expressway was introduced to make the area motor vehicle friendly along the western side of the central business district. Combined with above ground and underground car parks, this ensures the needs of motorist are well served in the city centre. Not forgetting the needs of pedestrians, Queen Street Mall was introduced and also the covered Wintergarden Galleria plus other pedestrian arcades in the area.

== Other works ==
- Central Library, University of Queensland, 1973
- Library and Humanities Building, Griffith University, 1975
- C.M.L. Building (office tower), Brisbane, Early 1980s
- Belconnen Town Centre Library, A.C.T., 1981
- Queen St Mall urban works (Stage 1), Brisbane, 1982
- Alterations to ANZAC Square, Brisbane, 1982
- Colonial Mutual Building (office tower), Brisbane, 1984
- Wintergarden (Stage 1), Brisbane, 1984
- Queensland Museum, Brisbane, 1987
- State Library of Queensland, Brisbane, 1988
- Alterations to St Stephen's Cathedral, Brisbane, 1988
- 111 George Street (office tower), Brisbane, 1993
- National Australia Remembers Freedom Wall (Mt Coot-tha Gardens, now known as the Brisbane Botanic Gardens), 1996

== Awards and recognition ==
- 1963 RAIA Queensland House of the Year Award for Perrins House, Ascot
- 1966 RAIA Queensland House of the Year Award for Mocatta Residence, Yeronga
- 1968 RAIA Building of the Year Award for Church in Kenmore, Brisbane
- 1982 Canberra Medallion for Belconnen Library, ACT
- 1982 Sir Zelman Cowen Award for Public Architecture for Queensland Art Gallery
- 1982 Queenslander of the Year
- 1983 Order of Australia in recognition of service to architecture
- 1986 Griffith University honorary Doctorate
- 1988 Advance Australia Award
- 1989 Australian Institute of Architects Gold Medal for outstanding performance and contributions to architecture
- 2000 RAIA National Awards
- 2000 Lachlan Macquarie Award for St Stephen's Chapel
- 2010 Sir Roy Grounds Award for Enduring Architecture for Belconnen Library, ACT
- 2004 Robin Gibson Award for Enduring Architecture for Queensland Art Gallery (Queensland 25 Year Award)
- 2010 Robin Gibson Award for Enduring Architecture for Queensland Performing Arts Centre (Queensland Award for Enduring Architecture)
- 2013 Queensland Award for Enduring Architecture renamed Robin Gibson Award for Enduring Architecture in his honour

== Bibliography ==
- Architecture in Australia, 1968 Nov., v. 57, n. 6, p. 923-957
- Architecture Australia, 2000 Nov.-Dec., v.89, n.6, p.[34]-69
- Gibson, Robin. Life Style and the Built Environment. Brisbane: Aquinas Library, 1981.
- Jones, Lloyd. “Roots in the most unlikely of places: Reconsidering the Queensland Art Gallery” in Proceedings of the Society of Architectural Historians, Australia and New Zealand 36, Distance Looks Back, edited by Victoria Jackson Wyatt, Andrew Leach and Lee Stickells (Sydney: SAHANZ, 2020), 217-29. Accepted for publication November 10, 2019.
- Jones, Lloyd and Annalise Varghese. “Lifting the Veil: Examining the Proposed New Performing Arts Venue for the Queensland Performing Arts Centre.” In Proceedings of the Society of Architectural Historians Australia and New Zealand: 37, What If? What Next? Speculations on History’s Futures, edited by Kate Hislop and Hannah Lewi, 100-110. Perth: SAHANZ, 2021.Accepted for publication December 11, 2020.
- Jones, Lloyd. “The Architecture of Robin Gibson & Partners (c1958-2013).” PhD Thesis. The University of Queensland, School of Architecture, 2023. doi:10.14264/900796d.
- Plaat, Deborah Van der & Lloyd Jones (eds). Light, Space, Place : the Architecture of Robin Gibson. Collingwood, VIC: Uro Publications, 2022. ISBN 9780648685838.
