= Wintergarden, Brisbane =

Shopping centre in Brisbane, Queensland, Australia

Coordinates: 27°28′09″S 153°01′36.4″E

Wintergarden
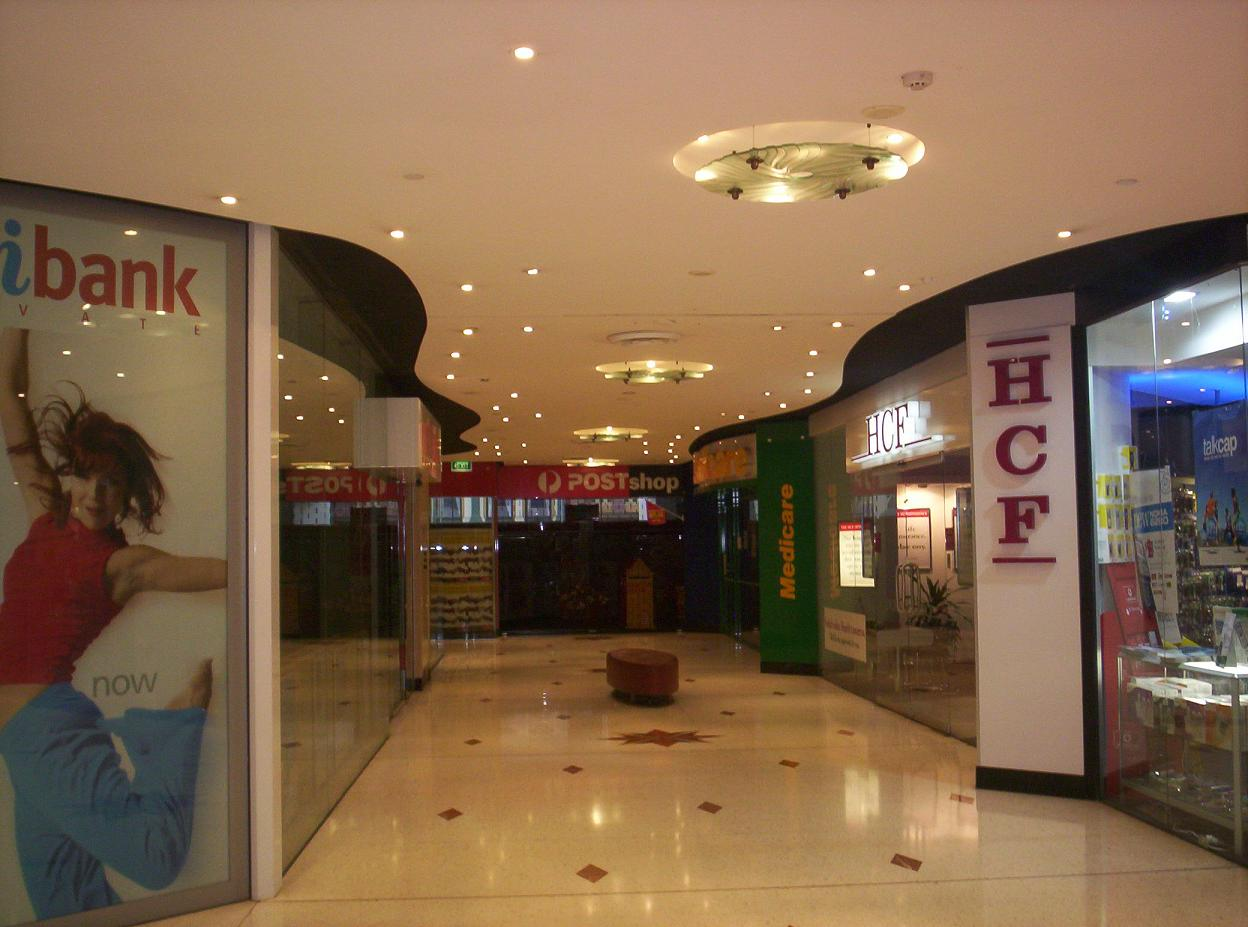
- Wintergarden exterior from Queen Street Mall
- Location: Brisbane, Queensland
- Address: 171-209 Queen Street Mall, Brisbane
- Opened: 1982
- Owner: Industry Superannuation Property Trust
- Architect: Stage 1: Robin Gibson; Stage 2: Harry Seidler
- Num. of stores: 60
- Website: www.wgarden.com.au

Wintergarden is a shopping centre in Brisbane, Queensland, Australia. It contains over 60 specialty stores over three levels. The centre was developed by the Kern Corporation and constructed by subsidiary, Kern Construction. It was intended to create a retail focus to the 1982 Commonwealth Games.

== History ==
The location previously operated as the 2000 seat Wintergarden Theatre cinema complex from 1924 until it closed in 1973 and was demolished in 1981. The original building was designed by Ballantyne & Hare of Melbourne. Hall & Prentice in Brisbane provided local design assistance. The theatre featured a Wurlitzer pipe organ which could be raised and lowered from the orchestra pit. In 1929 the rival Regent Theatre opened also in Queen Street. With the transfer of ownership of the theatre to the Kern Corporation in the 1970s, and plans for the construction of the Queensland Performing Arts Centre at South Bank, the Her Majesty's Theatre building next door to the Wintergarden was also marked for demolition and inclusion in the proposed new Wintergarden shopping centre.

== Shopping precinct development ==
The development beginning in the 1980s covered two stages, the first provided for three levels of retail and a two-storey carpark above. It boasted several national retailers previously unknown to Brisbane shoppers and the first CBD food courts covering a variety of cuisines. It was opened by the Premier of Queensland, Joh Bjelke-Petersen, in 1982. In 1987 the second stage was developed adjacent to Stage 1 and comprised additional specialty shops, a multi-cuisine sit-down restaurant (again, a first for the city and originally operated for 24-hours), and the Hilton hotel which was intended to provide 5-star accommodation for World Expo 88. Hilton International Brisbane opened in October 1986.

In November 2009, it was announced that a $100 million refurbishment of Wintergarden would take place in two 12-month stages. The Wintergarden's facade was enhanced on all three street frontages. As part of the exterior works, the old skybridge linking the Wintergarden to the David Jones department store was removed. In addition, screens were placed above each entrance, which feature programmed LED lighting.

Redevelopment principal architect was The Buchan Group, and redevelopment façade architects were Studio 505. Redevelopment was completed in 2012.
