= Queensland Performing Arts Centre =

Australian performing arts venue

- QPAC
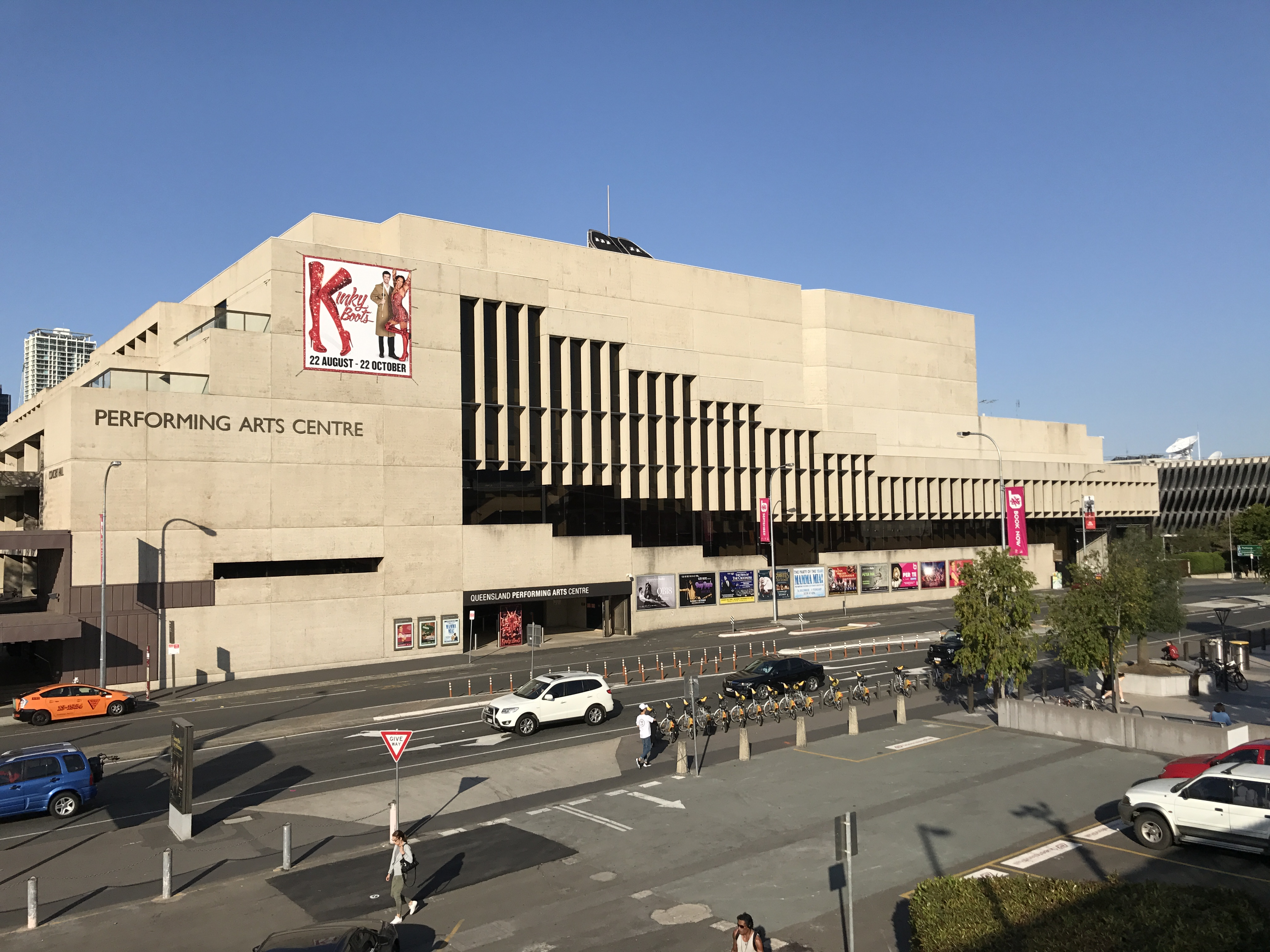
- View of the Grey street side of the Queensland Performing Arts Centre in 2017
- Interactive map of Queensland Performing Arts Centre
- Coordinates: 27°28′30″S 153°01′12″E
- Capacity: Lyric Theatre: 2,000; Concert Hall: 1,800; Playhouse: 850; Cremorne Theatre: 300; Glasshouse Theatre: 1,500
- Type: Performing arts centre
- Public transit: South Brisbane railway station Cultural Centre busway station South Bank ferry wharf

Construction
- Opened: 1985
- Renovated: 2011–2012
- Architects: Robin Gibson (1985); Philip Cox (2012); Blight Rayner, Snøhetta (2018)
- Builder: Barclay Mowlem

Website
- www.qpac.com.au

The Queensland Performing Arts Centre (also known as QPAC) is a performing arts centre located on the corner of Melbourne Street and Grey Street in Brisbane's South Bank precinct. Opened in 1985, the venue forms part of the Queensland Cultural Centre, and includes the Lyric Theatre, Concert Hall, Playhouse, Cremorne Theatre and Glasshouse Theatre.

== History ==
QPAC was designed by local architect Robin Gibson in the mid-1970s, after State Cabinet formally recognised in 1972 the need for a new Queensland Art Gallery and a new major performing arts centre, in addition to a new location for the Queensland Museum and State Library. It was opened by the Duke of Kent on 20 April 1985.

Although originally opened as the Queensland Performing Arts Complex, after years of resisting the popular mis-naming of the building, it was officially changed to the "Queensland Performing Arts Centre" and all signage was altered to match.

Opening with only 3 stages, the Lyric Theatre, the Concert Hall and the Cremorne Theatre, the Centre was designed with expansion in mind. In 1998 the Playhouse was opened, ending the original extension plans. A fifth and final theatre (seating 1500–1700) was announced in late May 2018 with a budget of $125 million. It was under construction as of 2018.

In 2017, QPAC hosted more than 1.3 million visitors to more than 1,200 performances.

== Programming ==
Each year QPAC hosts over 1,200 performances across its four theatres and outdoor spaces. The centre's venues accommodate a wide variety of performance including dance, musicals, theatre, opera, comedy and contemporary and classical music concerts that feature Queensland, Australian and international actors, dancers, musicians, artists and companies. In addition, QPAC co-produces and invests in some of Australia's innovative and successful shows and free outdoor programs.

In recent years, QPAC has presented some of the world's leading artists and companies in the QPAC International Series including Paris Opera Ballet in 2020, Bolshoi Ballet in 2019, La Scala Theatre Ballet in 2018, The Royal Ballet in 2017, Bolshoi Ballet in 2013, Hamburg Ballet, Hamburg State Opera and Hamburg Philharmonic in 2012 and American Ballet Theatre in 2014.

QPAC produces the Out of the Box Festival for children 8 years and under, and Clancestry program, as part of the QPAC First Nations Program which recognises the significant role First Nations of Australia have contributed and continue to contribute to Queensland's historical, creative and cultural landscapes.

QPAC is the performance home for Queensland's leading performing arts companies – Queensland Ballet, Queensland Theatre Company, Opera Queensland, Queensland Youth Orchestras and Queensland Symphony Orchestra. In addition, QPAC regularly hosts many of Australia's leading performing arts companies including The Australian Ballet, Sydney Dance Company, Australian Chamber Orchestra and Bangarra Dance Theatre.

== Performance spaces ==
QPAC Concert Hall

- The Lyric Theatre is a proscenium theatre and is the largest venue in QPAC, with a seating capacity of approximately 2,000. It is Brisbane's main venue for musicals, operas and ballets.
- The Concert Hall is the second largest venue in QPAC, with a seating capacity of approximately 1,600 (1,800 if the choir balcony seats are used). It is Brisbane's main venue for orchestral performances although it is also used for comedy performances, graduation ceremonies, awards presentations and even rock concerts. The venue features a 6,566 pipe Klais organ which was built in 1986. Due to the overwhelming demand placed on the entire venue for traditional theatrical performances, in 2014 a creative solution was achieved by the addition of a removable proscenium arch and stage mechanisms for the Concert Hall increasing the type of performances possible in this theatre.
- The Playhouse is a proscenium theatre with a seating capacity of approximately 850. The venue was constructed in 1997 and its premiere production was The Marriage of Figaro, with Geoffrey Rush in the title role of Figaro, in September 1998.
- The Cremorne Theatre has a maximum seating capacity of 277. It is a reconfigurable performance space with six configurations (proscenium, theatre in the round, concert, cabaret, cinema or flat floor). Its name has been taken from an earlier venue in the vicinity, the Cremorne Theatre. Located at the entrance to the Cremorne Theatre is the Tony Gould Gallery; it features changing exhibits related to the performing arts, including theatre, opera, ballet, dance, costumes and scenery. The exhibits are organised by the QPAC Museum.

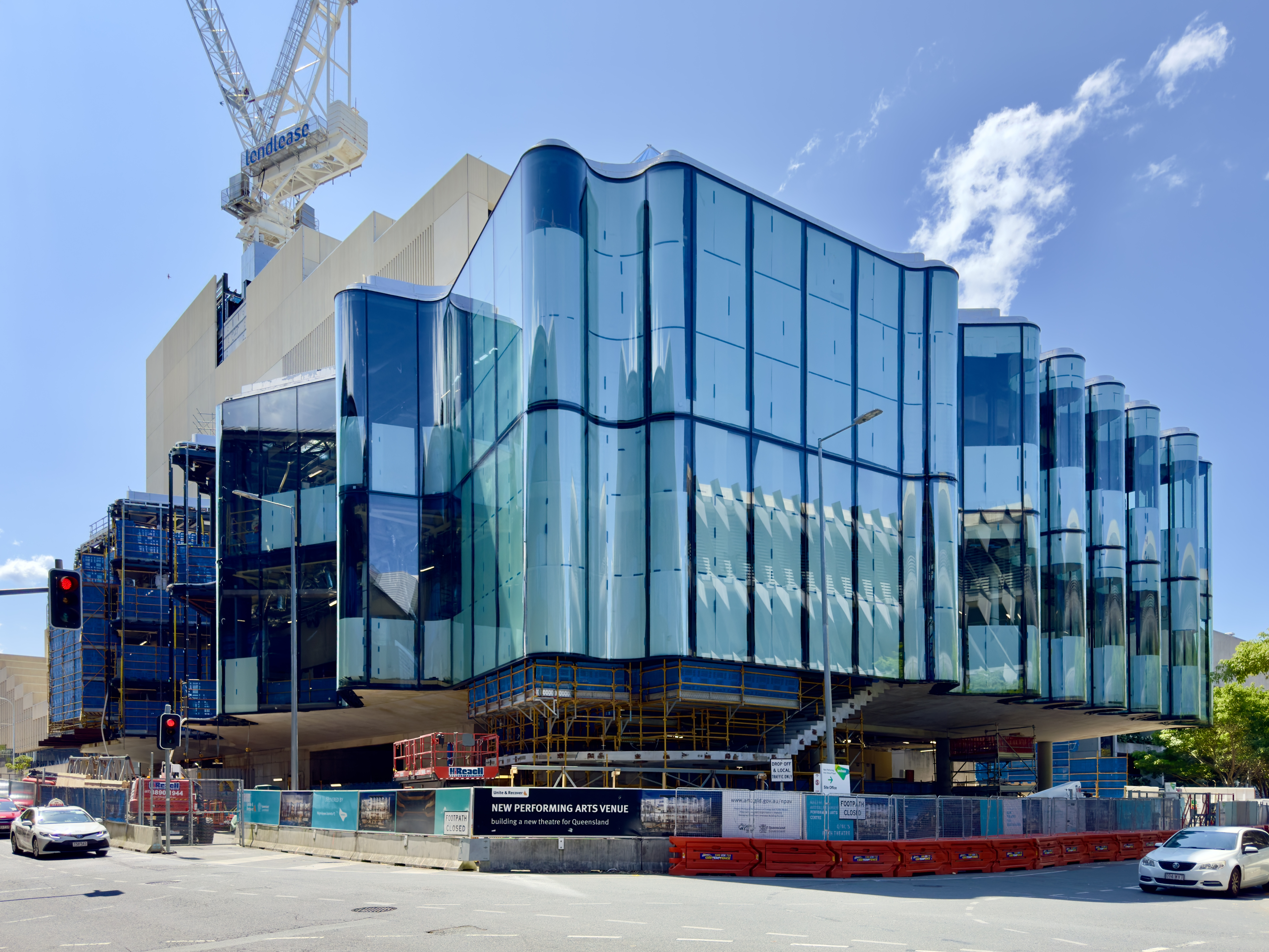
Construction of Glasshouse Theatre

- Glasshouse Theatre: In May 2018, the Queensland Government and QPAC announced funding had been secured for a new performing arts venue to be located on the Playhouse Green, adjacent to the current complex. The new theatre, designed by Brisbane architects Blight Rayner in partnership with Norwegian firm Snøhetta was projected to be completed by late 2022, and planned to seat a minimum of 1,500 patrons, making it the largest performing arts centre under one roof in Australia. The new theatre opened with a community day on 7 March 2026, followed by an opening gala on 12 March.

Name	Capacity	Main performances
Lyric Theatre	2,000	Musical; Opera; Ballet
Concert Hall	1,600–1,800	Orchestra; Concert
Playhouse	850	Theatre; Ballet
Cremorne Theatre	277	Theatre; Comedy; Cabaret
Glasshouse Theatre	1,500	Musical; Opera; Ballet

== Associated organisations ==
Groups with programs at QPAC include:

- Opera Queensland
- Queensland Symphony Orchestra
- Queensland Ballet
- Queensland Theatre Company
- Queensland Youth Symphony Orchestra
- Queensland Pops Orchestra
- The Australian Ballet
- Australian Chamber Orchestra
- Australian Brandenburg Orchestra
- Oscar Theatre Company
- Northern Rivers Symphony Orchestra
- The QPAC Choir
