= 111 George Street =

Building in Brisbane, Queensland

- View from Queens Gardens, 2009
- Interactive map of the 111 George Street area

General information
- Status: Completed
- Type: Office
- Location: Brisbane CBD
- Coordinates: 27.472541°S 153.025456°E
- Completed: 1993
- Owner: Queensland Government

Height
- Antenna spire: 145 metres (476 ft)
- Roof: 110 metres (360 ft)

Technical details
- Floor count: 31

Design and construction
- Architect: Robin Gibson & Partners
- Structural engineer: Barclay Mowlem
- Main contractor: Barclay Mowlem

111 George Street is a building on George Street in the Brisbane CBD, Queensland, Australia which was completed in 1993. The building is owned, managed and occupied by the Queensland Government. With its repetitive grill pattern, it is sometimes colloquially referred to as the 'cheese grater'. A sister project known as 33 Charlotte Street was later built on the adjoining site, and has a very similar façade. This smaller building is 75 m high and was completed in September 2004.

As with all Queensland Government assets, the Department of Housing and Public Works manages the building on a day-to-day basis.

== Tenants ==
111 George Street is currently occupied by three departments of the Queensland Government:

- Department of Families, Seniors, Disability Services and Child Safety (the Office of the Director-General is housed at 1 William Street)
- Department of Women, Aboriginal and Torres Strait Islander Partnerships and Multiculturalism (the Office of the Director-General is housed at 1 William Street)
- Arts Queensland

The building used to be occupied by additional departments of the Queensland Government, which have since moved to other buildings or 1 William Street, where most executive branch and executive-level units are housed.

== See also ==
- List of tallest buildings in Brisbane
