= Commissariat Store, Brisbane =

Heritage-listed storehouse in Brisbane, Queensland

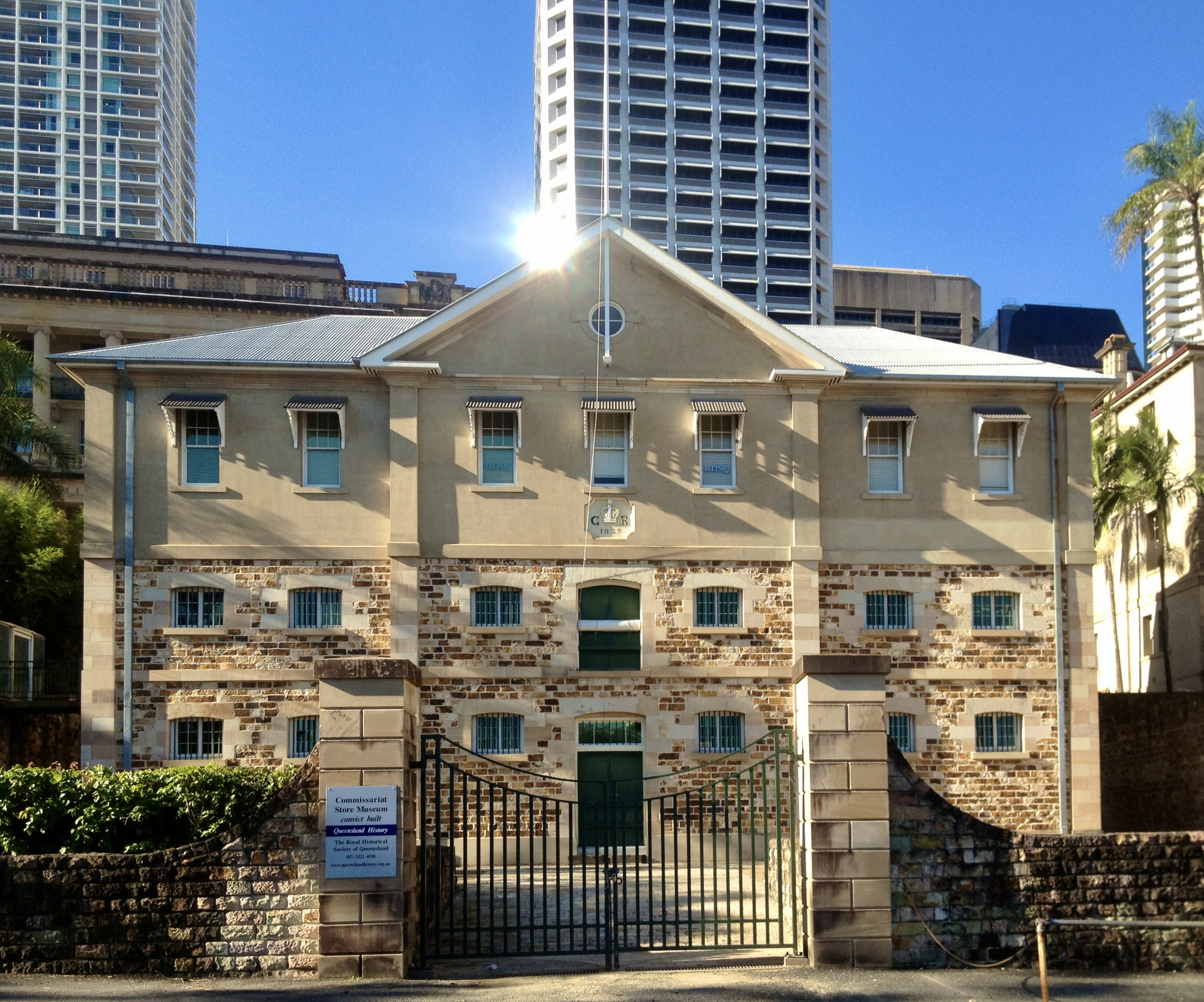
- Queen's Wharf Road facade of the Commissariat Store

- Location within Queensland
- 27.4732°S 153.0242°E
- Location: 115–127 William Street, Brisbane City, City of Brisbane, Queensland, Australia

History
- Design period: 1824–1841 (convict settlement)
- Built: July 1828 – 1829, 1913
- Built for: Moreton Bay penal settlement

Site notes
- Architect: William John Dumaresq
- Architectural style: Georgian
- Restored: 1969, 1978–1981, 1998–2001
- Current use: Royal Historical Society of Queensland
- Owner: Queensland Government
- Website: www.commissariatstore.org.au

Queensland Heritage Register
- Official name: Commissariat Store (former), Government Stores (1898–1923), State Stores Building (1923–1960), Commissariat Stores (former), Colonial Store (1860–1898)
- Type: state heritage (built)
- Designated: 21 October 1992
- Reference no.: 600176
- Significant period: 1828–29, 1890, 1912–13 (fabric); 1829–1960 (historical)
- Significant components: fence/wall – perimeter, store/s / storeroom / storehouse, wall/s – retaining, yard
- Builders: Convict labour

The Commissariat Store is a heritage-listed storehouse at 115–127 William Street, Brisbane City, City of Brisbane, Queensland, Australia. It is bordered by William Street, Queen's Wharf Road and the Brisbane River, and is the birthplace of Queensland. It was designed by William John Dumaresq and built from 1828 to 1829 by convict labour under the direction of Captain Logan as a permanent Commissariat Store for the Moreton Bay penal settlement. It is also known as Government Stores, State Stores Building, and Colonial Store. It was added to the Queensland Heritage Register on 21 October 1992.

The building is one of only two surviving buildings from the convict period in Queensland, and is one of only four surviving commissariat buildings in Australia. It is the second oldest building in Queensland, dated to 1829, the oldest building being the Windmill at Wickham Park, dated to 1828. However, the Commissariat Store is the oldest currently occupied building in Queensland, as it is currently occupied by the RHSQ, housing a museum, the Welsby Library, and function spaces.

== History ==
The Commissariat Store was constructed of local stone in 1828–1829 by Moreton Bay penal settlement convicts as a two-storey provisions store near the Brisbane River and what was to become Queen's Wharf. A third storey of rendered brick was added in 1913 to accommodate its continuing use as a government store and providing an address to William Street.

=== Moreton Bay Penal Settlement ===
In 1823 Moreton Bay was chosen as a penal settlement for New South Wales convicts who were secondary offenders or those who had re-offended while serving their sentence of transportation in Botany Bay. It was intended to better control the convicts and affect a reform in them through isolation, hard labor, strict discipline and harsh living conditions. In 1824 Lieutenant Henry Miller arrived at Redcliffe with thirty convicts. As this location proved unsuitable, the settlement was moved in 1825 inland to a ridge overlooking and bounded on three sides by the Brisbane River, and simple buildings were constructed to serve it.

Penal colonies were run on a military system and so a commissariat directed the procurement, supply and distribution of essential goods, as well as serving as a custom house and bank. The first building used for this purpose in what would become Brisbane Town at Moreton Bay was a slab structure in the vicinity of the current intersection of Albert and Elizabeth streets. There were two other store structures at Amity Point and Dunwich on Stradbroke Island. In 1826 Captain Patrick Logan arrived as Commandant and began a works program that replaced key buildings with more substantial structures made of stone and brick. One of these was the Commissariat Store. Along with houses for the Commandant, Commissariat officer and chaplain, it was erected on the ridge running parallel to William and George Street that remains the focus of government buildings to the present day.

A position near the river bank was selected for the new store, following recommended procedure, to allow goods to be conveniently loaded and unloaded from a wharf. This also provided a single point for the entry and distribution of tools, weapons, clothing and food rations to permit secure control of such vital supplies.

In common with the settlement's other new buildings, the Commissariat Store followed a simple design suitable for everyday use in a penal colony and was well constructed from local materials. The design was by William John Dumaresq (Acting Civil Engineer for New South Wales) whose plans arrived from Sydney in April 1828. Dumaresq was also responsible for the design of the store at Dunwich completed in 1828.

The original river bank in this area was quite steep and the underlying rock was quarried to create a relatively level building platform. The excavation work was heavy and carried out by the Gaol Gang of convicts as a specific punishment, but the masonry and other construction work required skilled labour and was most likely supervised by Lieutenant Thomas Bainbrigge, sent especially from Sydney with skilled stonemasons and quarrymen in 1827 and made Superintendent of Works for the colony the following year. Some time after retaining walls were constructed around three sides of the store building; the one to William Street appearing in an 1838 cross-section and the two at each side in Petrie's front elevation of the building also dated to that year.

The first outpost of the convict colony in Australia had been established in New South Wales in 1788, the settlement being almost immediately extended to Norfolk Island (abandoned in 1814 and re-established 1825), and then to Tasmania, to Newcastle (later to Port Macquarie), Moreton Bay and then to Western Australia. Apart from the Commissariat Store in Brisbane, there are seven other convict-built Commissariat Stores that survive today at:

- Hobart, Tasmania (1808–1810)
- Darlington Probation Station on Maria Island, Tasmania (1825)
- Oatlands, Tasmania (1827)
- Paterson Barracks Commissariat Store, Launceston, Tasmania (1828)
- Kingston and Arthur's Vale Historic Area, Norfolk Island (1835)
- Fremantle, Western Australia (1852)
- Guildford, Western Australia (1853–1854)

Two of the earliest store buildings in New South Wales at Sydney Cove (1812) and Parramatta, have been demolished. Only three of the surviving buildings, all of which have been quite changed over time, are older than the store in Brisbane. All built during a similar period and for the same purpose, the surviving store buildings exhibit a number of similar characteristics, which include proximity to both a point of entry for goods and the settlement served, robust and utilitarian form communicating authority, and incorporating aspects of Georgian and Regency architectural styles such as symmetrical elevations with windows decreasing in size from lower to upper levels, and restrained, Classically inspired decoration.

The importance of the Brisbane store and its river frontage as a portal to the colony was emphasised by the addition of the royal cypher of King George IV and the date to the front, river-facing gable; features retained when the third storey was added later. The clear orientation towards the river (and what is now Queens Wharf Road) is also reflected in the stonework itself, which is evenly coursed at the front, but more random at the rear (William Street) and sides (Miller Park to the north-west). The Commissariat Store was built of Brisbane tuff from the quarry at the Kangaroo Point Cliffs with sandstone from Oxley Creek used for footings, the base course, quoins, sills and lintels. Lime for mortar was then obtained from burning oyster shells from Amity Point on Stradbroke Island or from the newly established lime kiln at Limestone Hill in Ipswich. The windows were small, unglazed and barred for security and the roof was clad with ironbark shingles. The Commissarat Store was completed in 1829.

Features of the building included a brick drainage system throughout the foundation, as well as an 18 feet (5.5 m) retaining wall at the rear with a wall and gate at the front facing the river. The Commissariat Store procured, stored, and distributed goods and rations, such as food, clothing, and tools, for the penal colony.

The only entry point into the penal settlement was via the adjacent wharf on the Brisbane River. Initially known as the King's Wharf or Jetty, it was constructed by 1827 when the boat crew's hut and boat builder's shed were first occupied. A crane was constructed on the end of the wharf to transfer goods from the arriving ships to the shore. The main roadway into the settlement was up along the steep river bank following the present day alignment of Queens Wharf Road. A pedestrian path developed along the slope from the wharf to the ridge of present-day William Street passing to the north-west of the Commissariat Store, through what is now Miller Park. A retaining wall along the Queens Wharf Road frontage of Miller Park had been constructed by convicts before 1831. A wall, with an opening leading to stairs in a position corresponding to this path, appears in an 1838 plan. A pencil sketch by Henry Boucher Bowerman dated c. 1835 shows a wall here with an arched opening a few metres up the hill from the store yard wall.

=== Free settlement ===
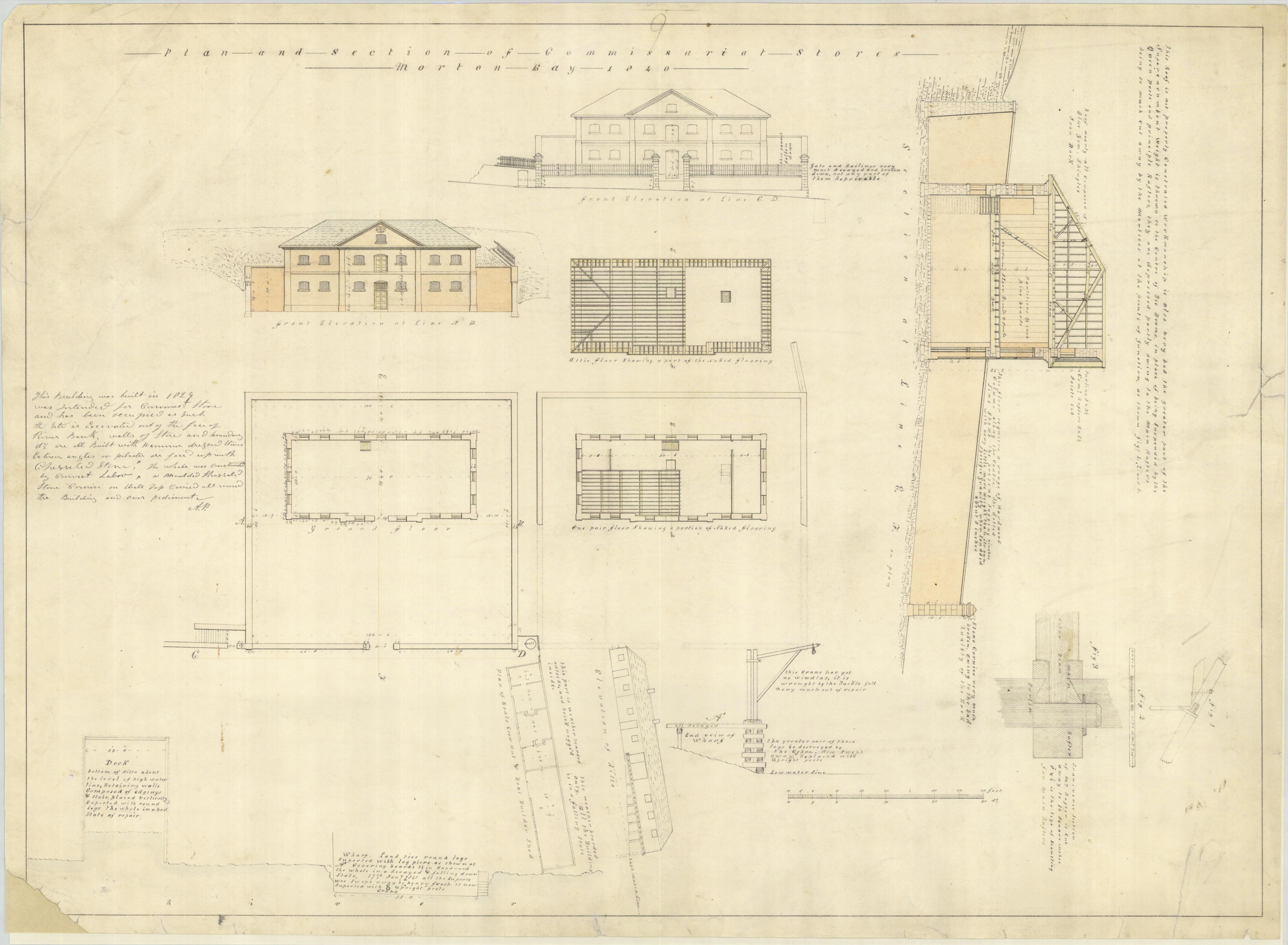
Architectural plans for the Commissariat Store, circa 1840

The penal colony closed in 1839 and Moreton Bay was declared open for free settlement in 1842. Other government buildings were soon sold or demolished but the Commissariat Store was retained for continued government use as a store. This did not require all the space available and allowed the upper floor to serve the government in a number of other capacities, being used for land sales in 1848 and intermittently to house immigrants during the 1850s. During this time a door was cut through to the first floor on the north-western side of the building. This enabled immigrants to enter the building through what is now Miller Park without the need to access the ground floor store. Proximity to the immigration barracks of the time (on the site of the Treasury Building), the former military barracks and guard house fitted out to receive immigrants in 1848, made the store a convenient place to accommodate overflow numbers. This use continued even after a purpose-built immigration barracks was constructed on land immediately to the south-east of the store in 1865–1866 (95 William Street) and is likely to have only stopped when the new Yungaba Immigration Centre opened at Kangaroo Point in 1887.

In 1860, following the creation of the colony of Queensland, the store was renamed the Colonial Store. It was repaired and the upper floor was converted for use as police barracks. Eighteen new hardwood sash windows were added. Internally, six pine batten doors and a partition were constructed to provide married men's quarters and single men's barracks on the first floor. At this time a fireplace, new ironbark shingle roof, wall, window and door were added to the kitchen building in the yard (constructed there c. 1857). On the ground floor of the store, a raised timber floor was installed and the windows enlarged and glazed.

The storekeeper and a staff of twelve handled everything from oil for lighthouses to blankets for distribution to the Aborigines. A cottage for the storekeeper was constructed in the southern corner of the yard between 1861 and 1872, with a gabled extension to it completed in 1873. During the "Bread and Blood" riots of 1866 an attempt was made to force entry to the store, possibly because it was seen as a symbol of government and its control of essentials.

Further north-west along William Street, the first purpose-built home of the Queensland Museum was constructed between 1876 and 1879 to a design by Francis Drummond Grenville Stanley in what is now known as the Old State Library. Over three storeys, it was intended this building comprise later stages. It created an area of open ground between its south-eastern side and the store that continued to be used as a pathway from the wharf area on the river and centre of town, and to provide access to the store's side door.

The Colonial Store was repaired and added to as the colony grew. In 1886 a single-storey brick wing was added at right angles to the original building on its southern corner running out to the boundary of the yard to the Queens Wharf Road. The wing was used as a stationery annexe, and received an extra storey in 1900. It is unclear what changes to other structures in the yard were occasioned by the erection of this annexe. It is possible the c. 1857 kitchen building was moved to the adjacent land (now Miller Park) at this time and the storekeepers cottage moved or demolished.

The yard also contained a number of ancillary buildings for storage and other purposes. The stables (and shed) which were said to have stood in the western corner of the yard were destroyed by fire in 1888 and then rebuilt. The old saddlery were destroyed in 1895 and replaced with a new building constructed between the store and the William Street retaining wall.

In October 1886, the Colonial Storekeeper had written to the Under Secretary of Works drawing his attention to the bad state of the wooden fence erected in William Street to back up the footpath in front of the store. A timber embankment was erected in 1887–1889 (above and about 1.5 metres away from the earlier retaining wall) and fill was used to even out the land surface. In 1890 the timber embankment was replaced by a concrete retaining wall that cut through the existing land fill.

A strong room was built in the Commissariat Store for record books in 1888 and in 1889 William Street was lowered necessitating some underpinning of the existing retaining wall. The roof shingles were replaced with corrugated iron about this time. In 1898, as the Federation of Australia approached, the store building was renamed the Government Stores.

=== 20th century ===
In 1898 the Commissariat Store was renamed the Government Store to reflect the Federation movement. By 1911 an additional storey was designed by Leonard Kempster, an architect for the Department of Public Works, to increase accommodation and provide access to William Street. Contractor, William Kitchen oversaw the construction of the new addition, which was completed in 1913. An electrical lift was then installed in 1914, operating between the three storeys.

The Queensland Government created the State Stores Board in Queensland on 23 March 1923, which would purchase and distribute all goods required by all government departments. The inaugural meeting of the State Stores Board was then held on 29 March 1923 at the Government Store. It was renamed the State Stores Building, and eventually vacated by them on 12 September 1960.

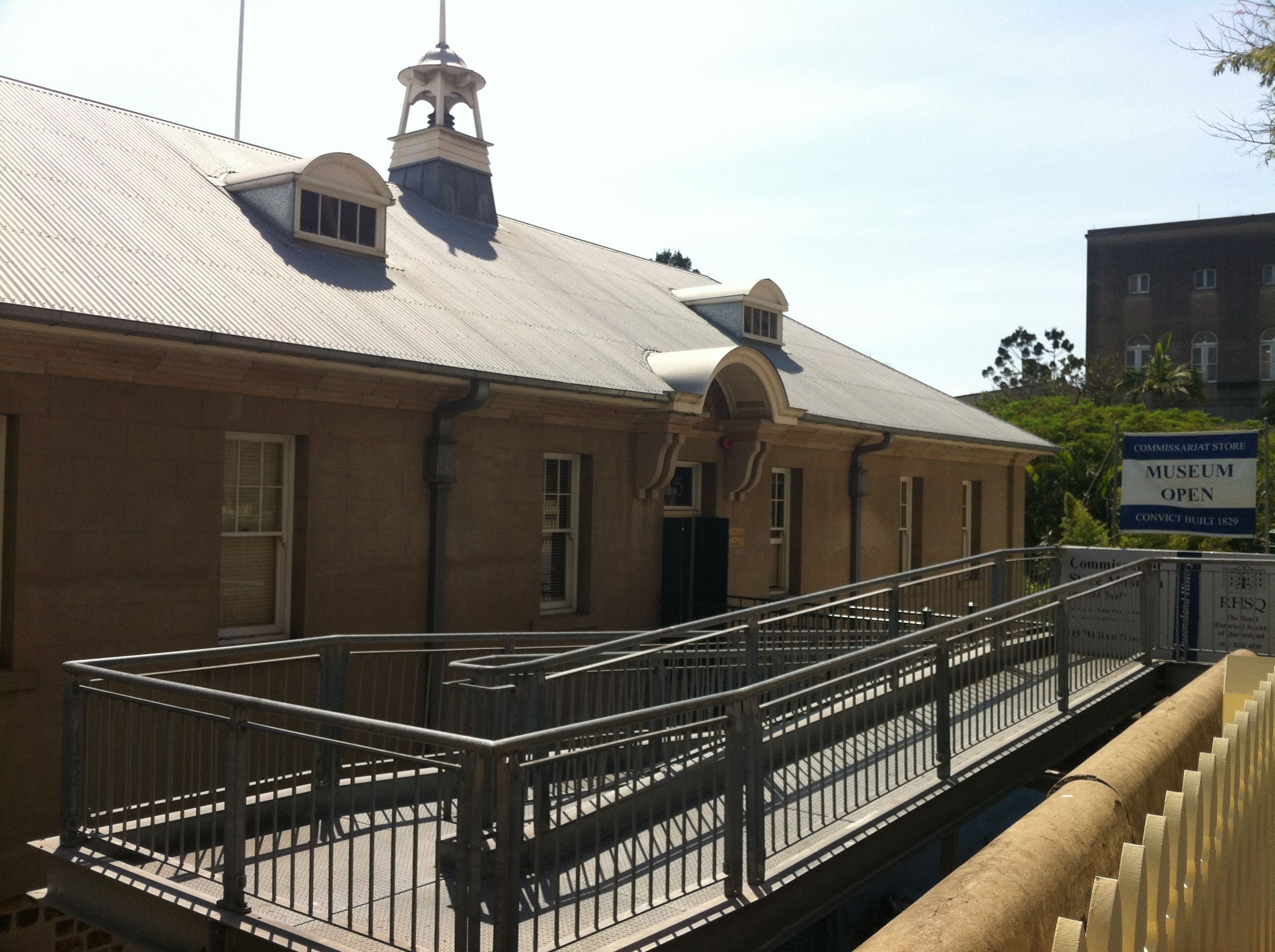
William Street view of the second floor of the Commissariat Store, 2012

The Building resumed providing accommodation for other overcrowded government departments, such as the Stock and Water Supplies Branch of the State Irrigation and Water Supply Commission until 1962, and the State Archives until 1968. The Firms Branch, Department of Justice, and Department of Stores shared the second floor. While the State Library and Law Reform Commission also occupied the building temporarily, all vacating the building by 1976.

In time, and as the city developed, the river location became less convenient. By 1907 it was deemed by the storekeeper to be too far from the steamer wharf and railway station. In 1911 he suggested that if relocation was not possible, the addition of a lightweight upper storey with access to William Street would be helpful, providing increased floor space and improving lighting and summer cooling conditions. This suggestion was adopted and the work was commenced by contractor William Kitchen at a cost of £2194 in late 1912.

The new storey was constructed of rendered brick in a Georgian Revival style sympathetic to the existing building. To keep costs down, as many as possible of the old roof timbers were reused and clad with new corrugated iron. A ventilation fleche and dormer windows were inserted to allow the attic space to be used and timber columns were added to the lower floors to help support the extra weight. A gantry and new main entrance to William Street with a semicircular hood effectively changed the orientation of the building towards the city. A new concrete retaining wall was constructed along part of the Miller Park frontage on William Street. The timber paling fence extended the full width of both lots was refurbished. Work was completed in 1913 and an electric goods lift added the following year.

In 1923, the State Stores Board was created as an initiative of the Labor government to facilitate efficient and economical purchase and distribution of goods used by government departments. This system ran with little change until the 1980s and it was administered from the former Commissariat Store, now renamed the States Stores Building. As storage needs increased, some sections moved to other buildings and in 1960 Stores vacated the building. Queensland State Archives then occupied the ground floor until 1968 and various government departments used the upper floors. Some alterations were made to accommodate their use, including installation of a new lift, which necessitated the removal of the penthouse of the 1914 lift, and probable removal of the fleche.

A plan from 1944 indicates that a number of ancillary buildings stood in the yard surrounding the Commissariat Store at that time, including: the two-story brick annexe in the southern corner (1886 and 1900); a packing case shed in the western corner; storage sheds along the northern part of the eastern elevation and the north and south- eastern walls of the building; a saddlery store along the entire north-eastern wall of the building (almost filling the gap between the building and the retaining wall to William Street); and a toilet block in the northern corner of the site.

During World War II, occupants of the store utilised a stair and walkway constructed at the top of the William Street retaining wall to access an air raid shelter associated with the adjacent Agriculture and Stock Building (95 William Street). It has been suggested that in 1945 an air raid trench constructed in the open land adjacent to the Commissariat Store (now Miller Park) was filled in.

One of the sheds in the yard was demolished and rebuilt in 1952–1953. A few years later the timber fence running along the store and park lots on William Street was replaced in chain wire. In the 1960s the saddlery store and another timber shed were demolished. The pedestrian bridges leading into the store from William Street and the open ground to the north-east (now Miller Park) were rebuilt in concrete, with the original iron balustrades and gate being reused.

The 1870s museum building on William Street (the Old State Library) had become the free Public Library of Queensland by 1902. Having housed the John Oxley Library from 1931, the building's name was changed to the State Library of Queensland in 1971. In 1958 major extensions were designed to commemorate the centenary of Queensland's creation as a separate colony from New South Wales. This work was complete by 1959 and involved the construction of a large loading dock in the north-western corner of the adjacent block (where Miller Park would be established in 1980). This dock stands within easement K/CP892185 (outside the heritage boundary) and destroyed part of the convict-built retaining wall along Queens Wharf Road and extinguished the archaeological potential of that area of land.

In 1959, a Queensland Government architect, EJA Weller, listed the Commissariat Store as a government building of heritage value deserving of protection. In 1969, the Queensland Government then agreed to make $40,000 per annum available for restoration of specified heritage buildings. Funding was also made available from the Hope Inquiry into the National Estate in 1974. The Department of Public Works employed two stonemasons to restore these government buildings. As stone repair to the Commissariat Store was extensive spanning many years, in 1970 a stone mason's workshop was set up in the yard to facilitate this work. In 1976 the building was vacated and the Royal Historical Society of Queensland (RHSQ) was granted occupation. The two-storey brick annexe was demolished at this time. Extensive renovations were completed to the Commissariat Store building between 1978 and 1979 including removal of the staircase, lift and strongroom and replacement of the 1861 flooring on the ground floor with masonry. The roof was tiled over new steel framework.

An archaeological investigation of the ground floor and ceiling spaces of the Commissariat Store was also undertaken in 1978 as part of the restoration works. An underfloor U-shaped brick drain was revealed during excavations (running under the centre of the building and appearing to drain from William Street toward the river. A wide range of artefacts were recovered in deposits below the floorboards, in the drain and in the ceiling spaces dating from the entire period of occupation and use of the building. The level of disturbance in the yard areas around the store occasioned by the demolition of a range of yard buildings founded on concrete slabs suggests it is unlikely that further archaeological evidence will be found under these areas. There is some potential to find artefacts in the land now occupied by Miller Park.

The land adjacent to the north-west of the Commissariat Store was officially gazetted as a park reserve in 1980 and named Miller Park after Captain Henry Miller, the first Commandant of the Moreton Bay penal settlement. The Store was officially opened as the headquarters of the RHSQ at this time. In 1982 in the Store's yard a paved driveway, grassed area and work shed for the stonemasons (later demolished in 1997) were installed. At this time a new stone wall and metal gates were also constructed to the Queens Wharf Road boundary of Miller Park, leaving a short section of convict-built stone wall. The park was also landscaped including construction of new ramps, staircases, retaining walls, rails and brick paths, the installation of lighting, seats, rubbish bins and new turf and plantings. None of these features are considered to be of cultural heritage significance.

The RHSQ was granted occupation of the Commissariat Store as its headquarters in July 1977. However, extensive restoration work ensued once again in 1978 before the RHSQ could move in during June 1981. This included the Works Department replacing the roof, installing a library and toilet on the second floor, along with refurbishing the floors and walls throughout, and landscaping the surrounding grounds of Miller Park. The building was then officially opened as the headquarters of the RHSQ on 24 November 1982, operating as a museum, library, and functions space.

Before restoration began in 1978 an archaeological excavation was conducted by the Queensland Museum, uncovering the original drainage system, modern material, oyster shells, bones, nails, buttons, ceramics, glass, and clay pipes. The University of Queensland conducted a second archaeological excavation after a water main burst in William Street during the floods in January 2011, which destroyed parts of the retaining wall, causing a partial collapse of the William Street frontage. Some 8579 artefacts were recovered, possibly dating to the convict period.

The stonemason yard was then vacated in 1997. A later restoration followed from 1998 to 2001 by the Department of Public Works, funded by the Centenary of Federation Cultural and Heritage Projects Program grant of $1.1 million and the Queensland Government of $865,000, to amend the most recent restoration by adding a lift, removing the stairs, and replacing the roof.

== 21st century ==
A conservation plan had been prepared for the Department of Public Works in 1998 and work began to reverse or modify inappropriate changes made during the renovations of the 1970s. The store's roof was re-sheeted in wide pan galvanised steel and the fleche reconstructed to recall its appearance in 1913. New pointing was completed both inside and out. The stair to the walkway on Miller Park was rebuilt. A new plywood floor was installed on the ground level, as were new steel tension members to the adzed beams there. A new lift, toilets and services, glass partitions and balustrades, and suspended ceiling on the top level were also installed at this time. This work was completed in late 2000, after which the building also housed the collection and library of the RHSQ.

The store was damaged by a burst water main during the flood of January 2011. Half of the William Street retaining wall between Miller Park and the walkway into the Store collapsed, sending over 75 cubic metres of sediment and debris into the yard and ground floor areas. A large concrete slab pierced the ground floor wall on the northern corner of the building. Emergency works were undertaken to stabilise the damaged section. The store's wall was repaired by Queensland Government stonemasons using original pieces of building stone salvaged from the debris. An archaeological salvage project recovered 8579 artefacts from the debris. Artefacts included ceramic, glass and faunal materials dating from the 1850s through to the 1880s. The artefacts derive from a single depositional unit of land fill within the stratigraphy of the site that dates to the construction of the timber retaining wall in 1887.

== Description ==
The Commissariat Store is a three-storey building set within an excavation in the ridge topped by William Street and facing the northern bank of the Brisbane River; the chief point of access to it being from William Street via a walkway connecting the top storey and footpath. The original path of entry from the river (and now demolished wharf) is from Queens Wharf Road through a paved yard, enclosed by a stone wall set with a central pair of iron gates (c. 1982).

The building is framed on the north-west and south-east by original retaining walls of roughly dressed and squared blocks of Brisbane tuff brought to courses, and on the north-east by a combination of retaining wall types. The early arrangement featured lower and upper walls separated by a slim triangle of land opening to the south. The upper wall was concrete while the lower was stone and largely convict-built. The northern end of the upper concrete wall collapsed and destroyed half of the lower wall in 2011. The damaged part of lower wall has been rebuilt using salvaged stone (some Brisbane tuff dating from the original construction and some sandstone installed in the 1970s). The undamaged section of the lower wall features original tuff blocks and upper sections of 1970s sandstone.

The two lower levels of the building are built of stone - both sandstone and iron-stained Brisbane tuff - and the upper storey is of rendered brick. The hipped roof is clad in corrugated galvanised steel sheeting and features a central fleche and gable centred on the Queens Wharf elevation, and two dormer windows facing William Street.

The south-western river-facing elevation is divided into three bays by engaged piers at each building corner and the projection of the central section of wall; the widest bay being the central one under the gable. It features an arrangement of three openings (windows and doors) on each level, while the side bays feature two windows each level. The windows on the lower two storeys are casements, while those on the top storey are double-hung. An oeil-de-boeuf is centred under the gable in the same position as a small window in the 1829 structure. Below this on the upper storey is also the royal cypher of King George IV and the date 1829 in a recessed panel. A large double door with fanlight opens into the yard from the centre of the ground level elevation, and above it is another door.

The arrangement of windows on the William Street elevation is similar to that on Queens Wharf Road, however there are no bays. An arched hood supported on twin corbels shelters the double entrance doors. Inside the curve of the hood are the words "Government Stores". As the upper level corresponds to the footpath level of William Street, these entry doors are accessed via a concrete walkway with iron balustrades. A modern ramp has been installed to the south of the walkway. The side elevations feature three windows each level. Windows on the lower two storeys have arched heads, while those on the top level to the north-west and south-west have hoods. Many of the former windows have bars, some of which are original. There is also a door to the first floor from Miller Park on the north-west side of the building.

Many changes have occurred on the interior, which comprises a series of temporary partitions to create office, exhibition and storage space for the RHSQ. Miller Park (excluding easement K/CP892185 in the north-west corner) contains no buildings, stepping down from William Street to Queens Wharf Road by means of a large terrace and a series of ramps and stairs. The c. 1982 landscaping consists of open areas of grass and plantings of various trees and shrubs. Park infrastructure includes concrete pathways and ramps with galvanised metal railings, brick garden edging and steps, lighting, seating and rubbish bins. The ramps, pathways and steps enable public access between William Street and Queens Wharf Road.

A path and gateway with glass security gate lead from Miller Park to the north-west entrance of the Commissariat Store. A stone retaining wall runs along the Queens Wharf boundary of Miller Park. The north-western half of the wall is the original convict-built construction predating 1838. The remainder is a c. 1982 replacement. None of the c. 1982 landscaping or infrastructure is considered of cultural heritage significance.

Although there is no physical surface evidence of potential archaeological remains, the documented history and usage of the site, and previous archaeological investigations including those undertaken following the January 2011 flood, indicates the potential for artefacts to remain subsurface in some areas of Miller Park.

== Current use ==
The ground, first, and half of the second floor are dedicated to both permanent and temporary exhibitions showcasing the RHSQ's collection. The second floor houses the administration along with the Welsby Library, which is available to researchers. The ground floor is also available for functions. Guided tours of the Commissariat Store operate by volunteers during business hours, catering to school groups, social groups, community members, and tourists.

== Heritage listing ==
The Commissariat Store was listed on the Queensland Heritage Register on 21 October 1992 having satisfied the following criteria.

The place is important in demonstrating the evolution or pattern of Queensland's history.

Completed in 1829, the Commissariat Store demonstrates the evolution of European settlement in Queensland, being one of only two buildings surviving from the Moreton Bay penal colony, having become a government store when free settlement was established until the 1960s and accommodating a range of other government uses, including serving as an overflow point for immigrants from the 1850s until 1887 when the Yungaba depot opened (Yungaba Immigration Centre). Changes to the fabric and orientation of the building over that time reflect the development of Brisbane. The adjacent area of land, now known as Miller Park, has been an open space since the earliest European settlement, and continues to provide a pedestrian thoroughfare linking the river and city.

The place demonstrates rare, uncommon or endangered aspects of Queensland's cultural heritage.

As a key penal colony structure, the Commissariat Store is an extremely rare survivor in Queensland and, being one of only eight convict-built commissariat buildings remaining in Australia, at a national level. The stone retaining walls that remain around the store and that fronting Queens Wharf Road along part of Miller Park are the only examples remaining in Queensland that were built by convicts. All these structures provide rare evidence of the building methods, skills and materials available at that time.

The place has potential to yield information that will contribute to an understanding of Queensland's history.

Archaeological investigation of the Commissariat Store building and Miller Park, has the potential to reveal important information about the penal colony and the subsequent use of the site. This investigation may provide insight into official and unofficial uses of the space, the lifeways of convicts, arriving immigrants and other early residents, as well as the material culture of nineteenth century Brisbane.

The place is important in demonstrating the principal characteristics of a particular class of cultural places.

This place is important in retaining the principal characteristics of a penal-era Commissariat Store that adapted to free settlement and transformation into a Government Store, through its simple form, robust construction, Georgian and Regency architectural influences - all of which help impart to the building a sense of the authority it represented - and its location between the river (from where goods and immigrants arrived) and the centre of the penal and later free settlement.

The place is important because of its aesthetic significance.

The Commissariat Store, the three retaining walls that carve its site out of the William Street ridge and the remaining section of wall on Queens Wharf Road are of great aesthetic value as landmarks, seen from William Street and from the Brisbane River. The place is an integral part of the most prominent and cohesive group of government buildings in Queensland, which includes the: former Treasury Building (Treasury Building, Brisbane), former State Library (Old State Library), former Land Administration Building (Land Administration Building), Queens Gardens (Queens Gardens, Brisbane), and the former Government Printing Office (Government Printing Office).

The place has a special association with the life or work of a particular person, group or organisation of importance in Queensland's history.

The Commissariat Store has a special association with Commandant Patrick Logan, as one of the few remaining components of his penal-era building program, which made a major contribution to the development of the colony and state of Queensland.

The building also has an enduring association with the Royal Historical Society of Queensland, its occupant since 1976 which has adopted the building's riverside elevation as the dominant feature of its logo.

== See also ==
- History of Queensland
