= Queensland State Archives =

Archival institution in Queensland, Australia

Coordinates: 27.6111°S 153.0734°E

Agency overview
- Preceding agency: State Library of Queensland
- Jurisdiction: Government of Queensland
- Headquarters: Runcorn, Brisbane, Queensland
- Employees: 86 (2016)
- Agency executive: Louise Howard, Queensland State Archivist
- Parent department: Department of Justice
- Website: https://www.qld.gov.au/recreation/arts/heritage/archives

The Queensland State Archives is the lead agency for public recordkeeping in Queensland, Australia. It is the custodian of the largest and most significant documentary heritage collection about Queensland.

Established in 1959, Queensland State Archives promotes the implementation of appropriate recordkeeping principles and practices across public authorities and regulates the retention and disposal of public records.

Queensland State Archives develops recordkeeping policy and provides advice to public authorities on the management of public records and facilitates access to information about government for the people of Queensland.

Under sections 24 and 25 of the Public Records Act 2002, Queensland State Archives has a range of functions and powers including the ability to:

- Issue standards regulating the creation, management, disposal, storage and preservation of government records
- Conduct research and provide advice to public authorities about the making, managing and preserving of public records
- Issue policies, standards and guidelines to achieve compliance with the legislative policy frameworks for best practice records management
- Ensure the archival collection is accessible to government and the people of Queensland
- Identify and preserve public records of permanent value as the State’s archives
- Provide climate-controlled storage facilities for permanent archival records.

== History ==
Recordkeeping in Queensland is not just a modern or new activity. As early as November 1861, an extract from the Brisbane Courier refers to provision of storage for valuable historical documents relating to the early history of the settlement. In 1917 the Royal Historical Society of Queensland called for a "proper system of dealing with the archives of Queensland". Later, in 1932 the Governor of Queensland, Sir Leslie Wilson wrote to the Premier of Queensland, William Forgan Smith regarding a Central Record Office expressing his concern at the inadequate storage and subsequent destruction of many valuable public records. In 1939, Sir Raphael Cilento (a former Vice-President of the Royal Historical Society of Queensland) commented that a Department of Archives should be established.

=== Libraries Act 1943 ===
When the Queensland Government passed the Libraries Act of 1943, Part IV of the act dealt with public records. However, there was a provision in Part IV to postpone its implementation and archival legislation was not implemented for another 15 years. In 1953 the Government claimed that "it has not been possible to implement this portion of the Act owing to difficulties which have arisen, chief of which has been a lack of suitable space in which to store and display these documents."

While some records were transferred to the State Library of Queensland for preservation, it was not until 31 July 1958 that Part IV of The Libraries Act 1943–1949 was proclaimed and became effective. On 4 November 1959, Robert Sharman was appointed as the first Archivist within the Public Library of Queensland (now the State Library of Queensland) and Queensland State Archives commenced its activities.

The act placed archival authority in the hands of the State Librarian and made the Library Board of Queensland responsible for the destruction of records. The official position of State Archivist was not created until more than 20 years later in September 1981.

=== Genealogy interest and the associated challenges ===
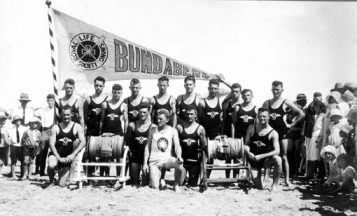
Bundaberg Surf Life Saving Club Members, Nielson Park, Burnett Shire, c.1931

By the late 1970s and early 1980s a surge in genealogical and family history research created a heavy demand for reference services and access to records. The Queensland State Archives Public Search Room was expanded to accommodate more clients and a modern storage warehouse in Acacia Ridge was acquired in 1983. The State Archivist of the day, Paul Wilson focused on Queensland State Archives' role in the management of semi-current records, including the preparation of a wide range of retention and disposal schedules.

In 1986 Queensland State Archives was accorded the status of a Division of the State Library of Queensland and developed a proposal for a new purpose-built facility. The Libraries and Archives Act 1988 defined the role and functions of Queensland State Archives and gave additional protection to public records through an increase in the powers of the State Archivist. It also expanded the definition of public records to include computerised records.

== Public Records Act 2002 ==
The Queensland Government introduced the Public Records Act 2002 in July 2002. It replaced Part 7 (sections 56–67) of the Libraries and Archives Act 1988 and the Libraries and Archives Regulations 1990 with a new statute devoted specifically to the management of public records. The act provided a contemporary framework for the management of public records and also marked a changing role for Queensland State Archives.

Queensland State Archives is established under section 21 of the Public Records Act 2002 (the act) as the State's archives and records management authority. With the introduction of the act, Queensland State Archives became the lead agency for State and local government recordkeeping in Queensland. The act and its accompanying Recordkeeping Information Standards enable Queensland State Archives to develop and implement a comprehensive recordkeeping policy framework to ensure a consistent approach to the creation, management, disposal, storage, preservation, and retrieval of government information.

== Related legislation ==
Public authorities are required to make 'complete and accurate records' in accordance with the Public Records Act 2002 (the act). To help public authorities to achieve this Queensland State Archives developed in 2002, Information Standard 40: Recordkeeping (IS40). This Information Standard aims to foster recordkeeping best practice across the Queensland public sector. The objective of recordkeeping best practice is to establish it as a systematic part of the essential business activities of all public authorities so that records are identified, captured and retained in accessible and usable formats that preserve the evidential integrity of those records for as long as they are required.

== Queensland State Archives buildings ==
With the appointment of an Archivist in 1959, space was initially allocated in the Commissariat Store in William Street, Brisbane, but this building was full by March 1962. Additional space in the Anzac Square government building and the old Lady Bowen Hospital also filled rapidly.

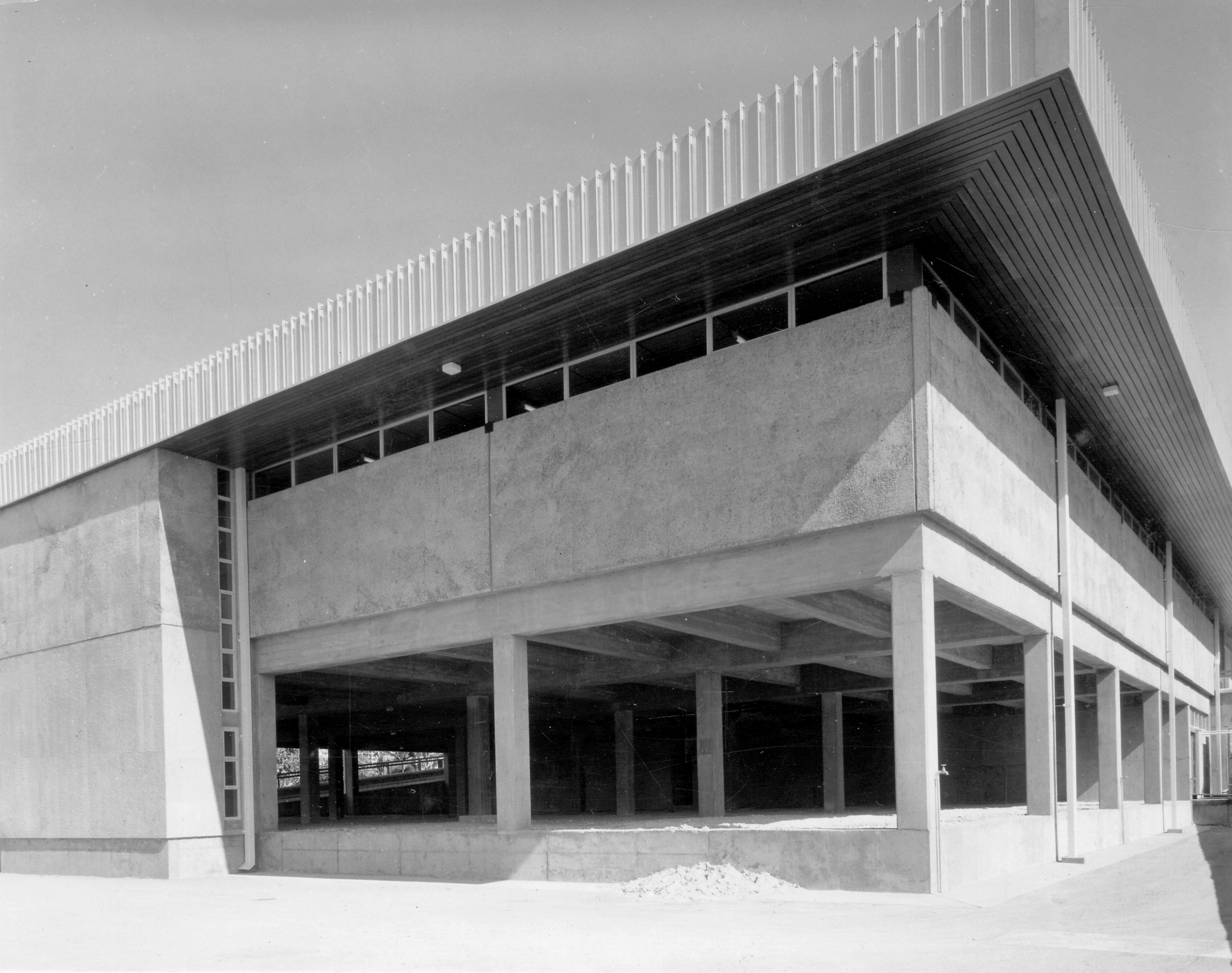
Queensland State Archives, Dutton Park, July 1968 during the construction

In July 1968 Queensland State Archives was relocated to a purpose-built facility in Dutton Park. Conservation was accorded a new emphasis in the Dutton Park building, with fumigation chambers installed to deal with pest and mould infestation. Stricter environmental controls were placed upon the storage of the records. There was an increase in the number and complexity of reference enquiries and new reprography services were introduced. A microfilm camera was purchased in 1971 and a microfilm storage vault was built. The use of microfilm provided access to heavily used records while preserving the original documents. Space was again an issue by 1974 and in 1978 a building at West End in Brisbane was acquired for use as remote storage. A new building was proposed and a site selected at Runcorn.

The current building at Runcorn was built in 1992. Officially opened in 1993, it was nominated for an architectural award and as a finalist received a commendation.

Continuing growth in the amount of archival public records led to the construction of a new building adjacent and connected to the existing Queensland State Archives building. The expanded facility opened on 10 November 2008, bringing the total floor area of Queensland State Archives to 23,322m^{2} and the total storage to approximately 90 linear kilometres. The expansion includes additional repositories which will allow Queensland State Archives to store records transferred from more than 600 Queensland public authorities for the next 10 to 15 years. The new Queensland State Archives building was designed to complement the appearance of the original building and to continue providing a secure, purpose-built environment that will aid in the long-term preservation of Queensland's documentary heritage.

The expanded facility project features environmentally sustainable initiatives including water harvesting from roof areas and car park surfaces for re-use in irrigation; recycling of water from cooling tower operations and efficient air-conditioning services, incorporating a purpose-built three million litre chilled water tank for off-peak electricity. Recycled or recyclable materials and fabrics were used in the construction, wherever possible.

== Access to records ==
Open records held by Queensland State Archives may be viewed onsite in the Public Search Room. Information about the records held can be found using the Queensland State Archives database ArchivesSearch. This database contains details of records and other information about State and local government agencies. Searching may locate references to Queensland Government records held by Queensland State Archives. Queensland State Archives also provides a reference service to remote users.

== Directors and State Archivists ==
- Robert Sharman (1960–1970)
- Paul Wilson (1972–1986)
- Lee MacGregor (1986–2000)
- Janet Prowse (2001–2014)
- Darren Crombie (acting, 2014–2015)
- Mike Summerell (March 2016 – March 2021)
- Louise Howard (August 2021 – present)
