= Old State Library Building, Brisbane =

Heritage listed former library building in Brisbane, Queensland

Old State Library Building
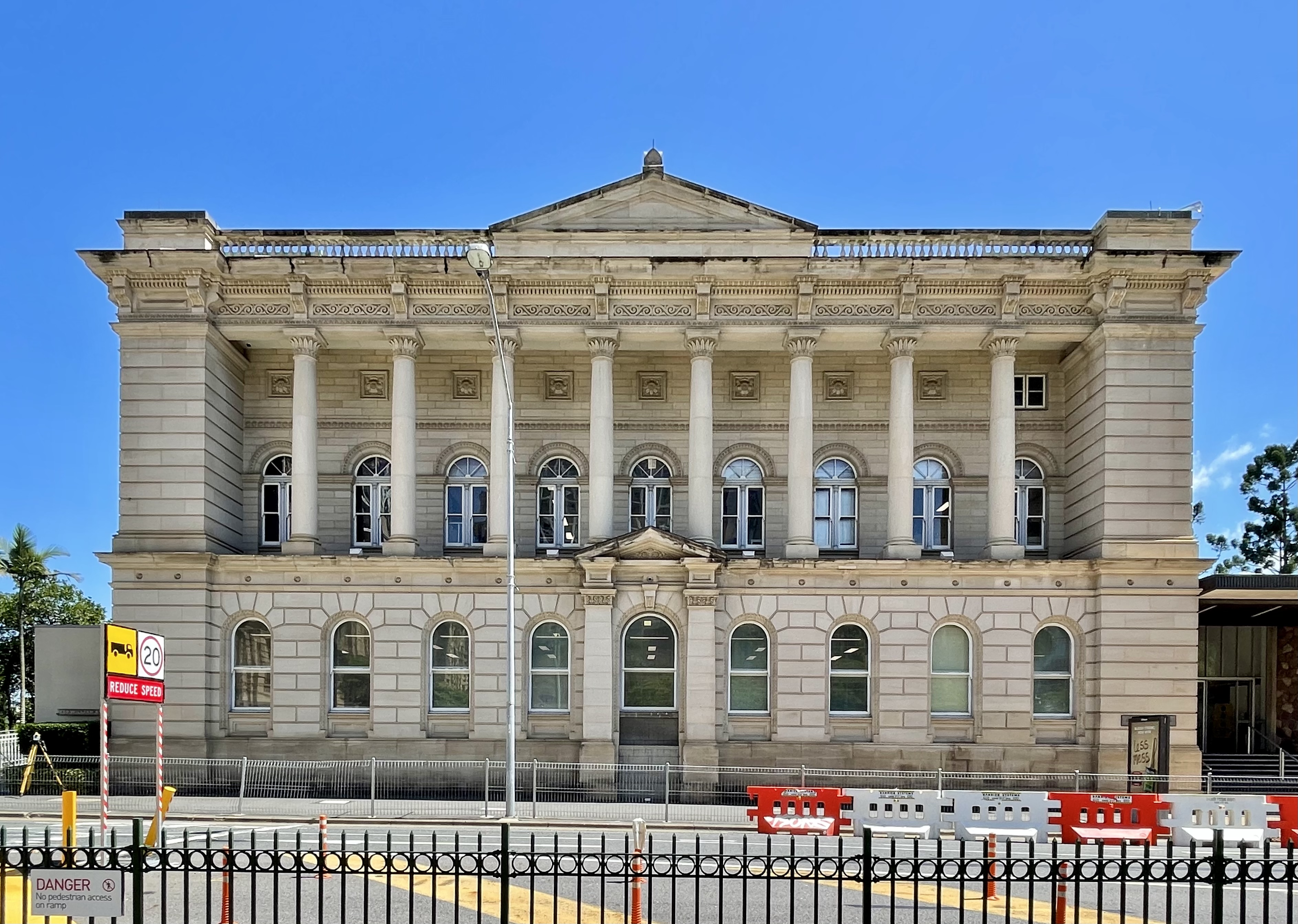
- Old State Library Building from William Street

- Location within Queensland
- 27.4727°S 153.0237°E
- Location: 159 William Street, Brisbane City, City of Brisbane, Queensland, Australia

History
- Design period: 1870s–1890s (late 19th century)
- Built: 1876–1959

Queensland Heritage Register
- Official name: State Library (former), Museum
- Type: state heritage (built)
- Designated: 21 October 1992
- Reference no.: 600177
- Significant period: 1902–1988 (historical Library); 1876–1900 (fabric Museum); 1902–1964 (fabric Library)
- Significant components: mural / fresco, library – building, sculpture

Old State Library Building is a heritage-listed former library building at 159 William Street, Brisbane City, City of Brisbane, Queensland, Australia. It is also known as the former Queensland Museum. It was added to the Queensland Heritage Register on 21 October 1992.

Originally constructed for the Queensland Museum opposite Queens Gardens, the building contained the State Library of Queensland from 1902 to 1988, when the State Library was relocated to the Queensland Cultural Centre at South Bank.

== History ==
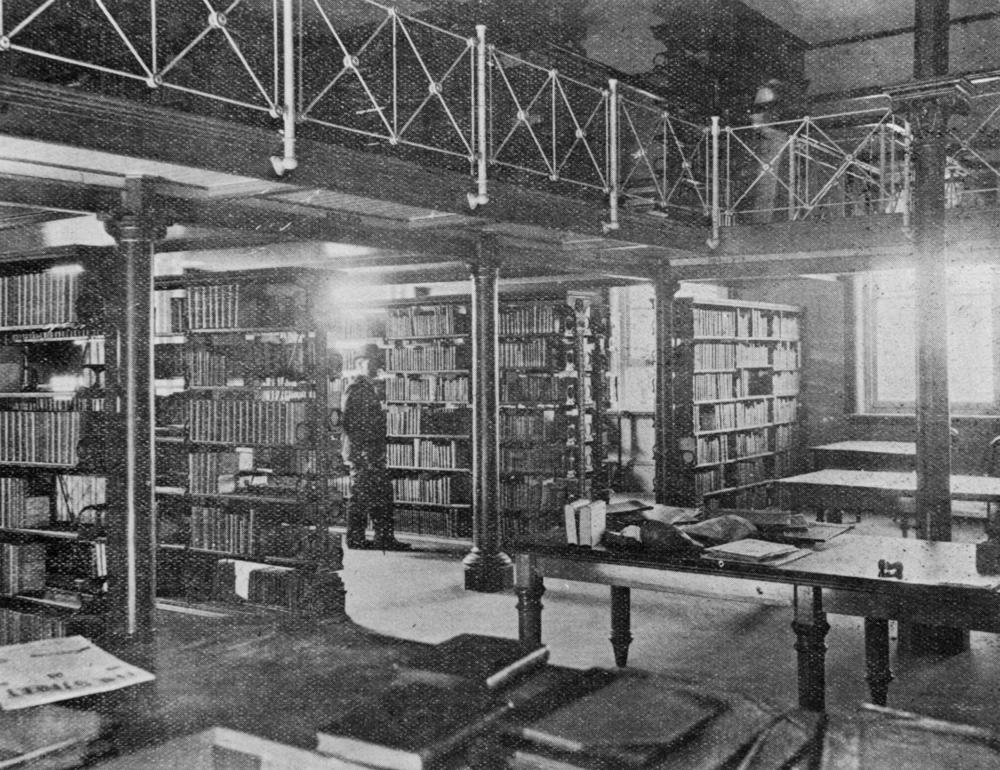
Reading room in 1902

This building was constructed in two stages. The three-storeyed William Street section was erected by the Queensland Colonial Government between 1876 and 1879, as the first purpose-built home for the Queensland Museum, which had been established in 1855. The four-storeyed extension was erected in 1958–59 as the Queensland Government's major centennial project.

In 1876 the design for the first section was completed by George Curtis Walker, under the direction of Queensland Colonial Architect FDG Stanley, and a construction contract for £10,701 was let to W. Macfarlane. The building was erected as stage one of a complex which was to incorporate two flanking wings housing the main staircases, and an arcade and colonnade fronting the river.

The choice of a classical style of architecture, modelled on 16th century Italian buildings and its central location close to the city's southern entrance, reflected the museum's importance in the scientific and cultural life of Brisbane.

The building was completed and occupied early in 1879, but proved inadequate for museum purposes. In 1881 the area below was levelled and the basement was extended. By 1884 the government was setting aside funds for a new museum building, but economic depression necessitated the museum remaining in the cramped William Street premises until removed to the former Exhibition Building at Gregory Terrace in 1899.

A £1,900 contract was let in September 1900 for the conversion of the former museum building into premises for the free Public Library of Queensland, established in 1896. The library opened in the refurbished building in April 1902. The name was changed to the State Library of Queensland in 1971.

The John Oxley Library, established in 1926 as the principal centre for research material on Queensland history, was housed in the State Library building from 1931.

As a major centennial project, the library building was extended in 1958–1959, at a cost of over £265,000. The additions, designed by government architects WG Thain, P Prystupa, U Stukoff, AJ Wheeler, D Davies and H de Jong, included an exhibition hall on the western side and reading rooms on the river elevation.

In 1958 national competitions were held for designs for a wall mural and sculpture to embellish the exterior of the new Centennial Hall. These were won by Victorian artist Lindsay Edward for his glass mosaic mural, and Brisbane sculptor Leonard George Shillam. Shillam's aluminium sculpture 'Enlightenment' showed three symbolic figures reaching towards the rays of the sun, representing 'the dissemination of enlightenment to mankind - the function of a library as an instrument of enlightenment'. It was cast by the Non-Ferrous Foundry of Brisbane.

The extensions were opened officially in August 1959 by Princess Alexandra.

From 1964 to 1965 the original building underwent a major renovation, including the addition of a concrete frame structure, new floors, a mezzanine and air conditioning and the removal of the skylight, at a cost of over £227,000. The exterior brickwork may also have been rendered at this time. The William Street frontage remained largely intact, as one of the city's few surviving 1870s facades.

The State Library of Queensland (including the John Oxley Library) moved to new premises in the Queensland Cultural Centre in 1988, and the building has since been used as library storage.

== Description ==
The Old State Library Building is situated between William Street and the Brisbane River, overlooking Queens Gardens. It was the first of a major series of government buildings: the Treasury Building, the Lands Administration Building, and the Family Services Building, which surround Queens Gardens. It is adjacent to the North Quay porphyry wall.

The Old State Library Building consists of two main parts; the original 1879 neoclassical structure and the 1959 modern extension.

The original building was a three storeyed masonry structure with a sandstone facade. The facade is designed using classical elements, with a rusticated base and double-height columns rising from the piano nobile to support an entablature. The centre of the facade is marked by an aedicula containing an arched doorway, at ground level (the original entrance, now blocked in) and a small pediment above in the entablature. The large unfluted columns form a colonnade in front of the second and third storeys, with lotus leaf capitals reminiscent of those of the Tower of the Winds. Corbels rise through the entablature above each column. The top pediment is marked by stretches of balustrade. All the windows in this front facade are arched.

The interior of the first section was substantially remodelled in 1964–1965, with the addition of a concrete frame structure, new floors, a mezzanine and air-conditioning.

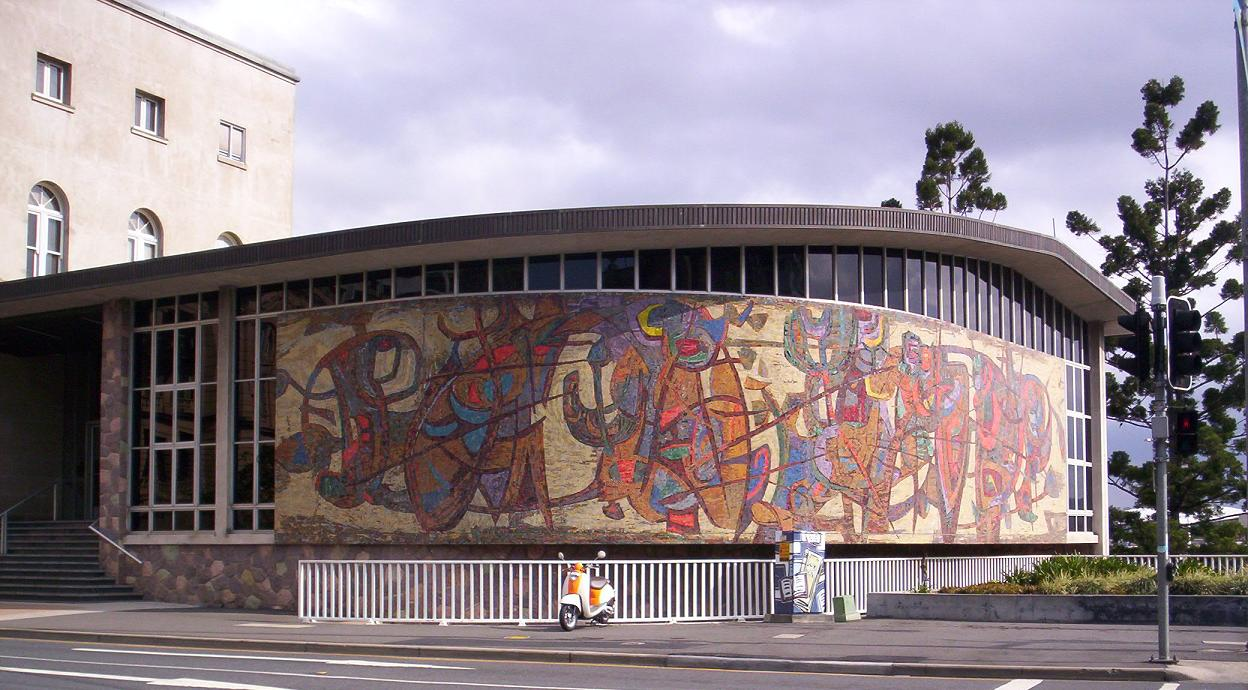
Mosaic Mural by Lindsay Edward, 2005

The 1958–59 modernist extension, to the west and south, is of four storeys, only one of which appears above William Street. The William Street frontage features a random patterned wall at the main entrance under a low-pitched copper-sheathed roof. The western wall is decorated with Lindsay Edward's large glass mosaic mural, 20.7 by 4.4 metres (68 by 14 ft), the design suggesting "primitive organic forms indicative of growth and development". On the river side is Leonard Shillam's aluminium sculpture approximately 6 metres (20 ft) high. Entitled "Enlightenment", it depicts three figures reaching towards the sun, symbolising the dissemination of enlightenment to mankind. To the south the extension was designed as a series of concrete fin walls providing views of the river, private work areas and shade from the sun.

== Heritage listing ==
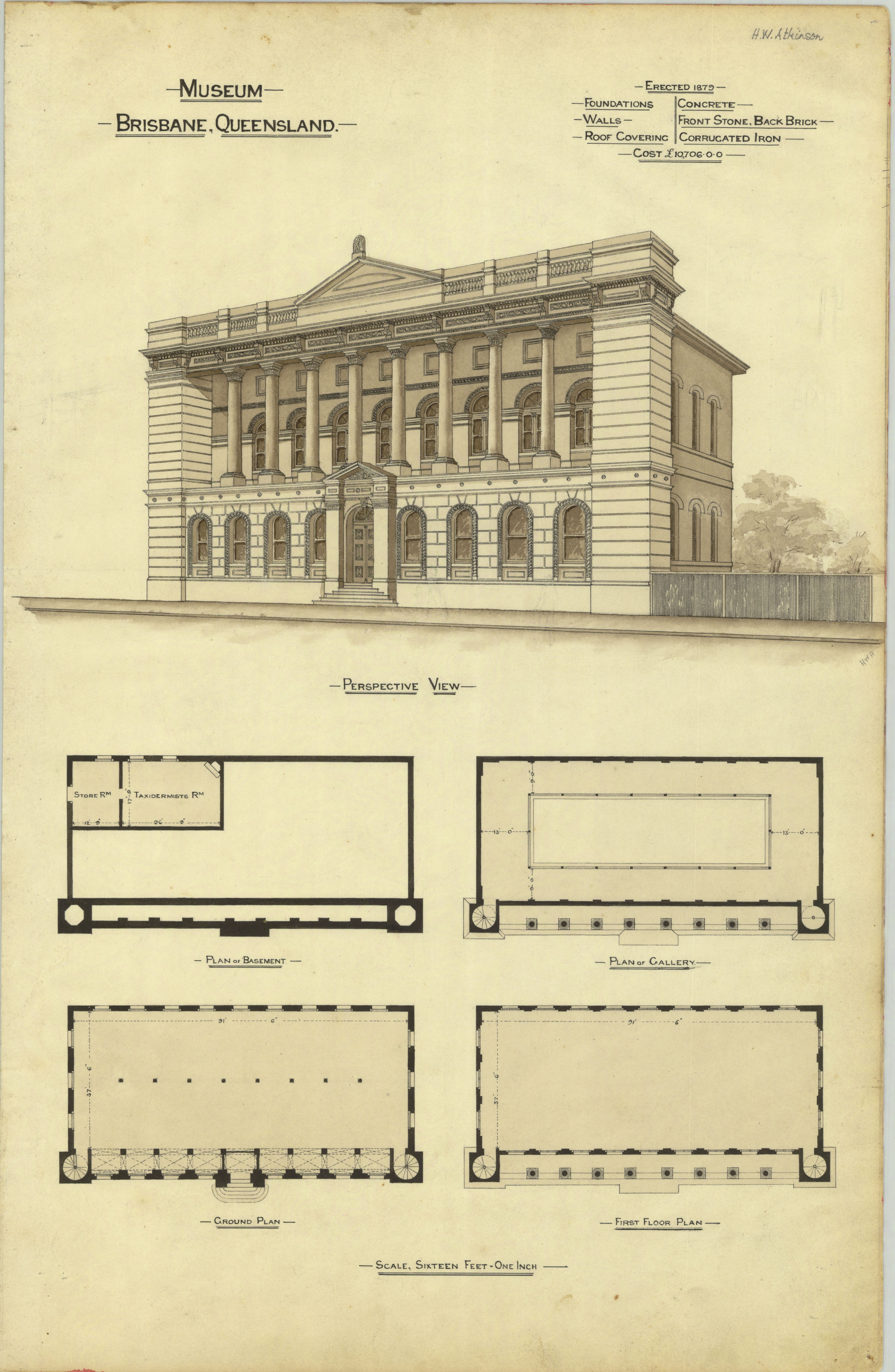
Architectural plans, 1888

The Old State Library Building was listed on the Queensland Heritage Register on 21 October 1992 having satisfied the following criteria:

- The place is important in demonstrating the evolution or pattern of Queensland's history.
- The former State Library provides evidence of the importance of the Queensland Museum as an institution in late nineteenth century Brisbane scientific and cultural life.
- The former State Library is significant for its historical association with the 1958–59 extension, the major centennial project by the Queensland Government and for its association with the State Library of Queensland since 1902.
- The place demonstrates rare, uncommon or endangered aspects of Queensland's cultural heritage.
- The building is significant as an example of an 1870s public building in central Brisbane.
- The place is important because of its aesthetic significance.
- The building is an integral member of the most prominent, important and cohesive group of government buildings in Queensland. As a fine classical facade by FDG Stanley, the building is significant for its architectural quality.
