= Richard Stringer (architectural photographer) =

Australian architectural photographer

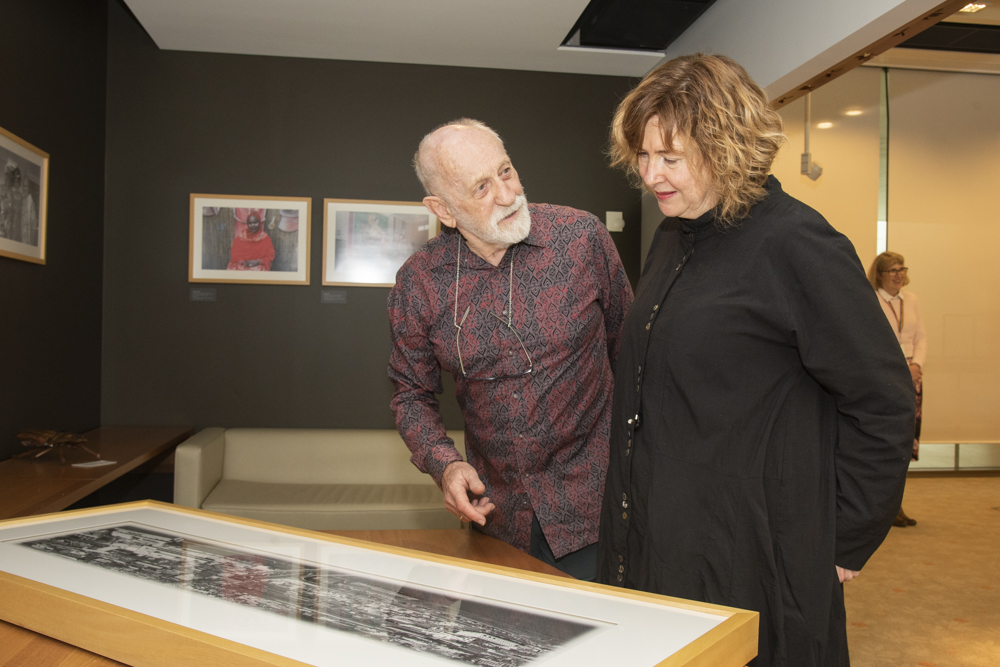
Architectural photographer Richard Stringer with State Librarian and CEO Vicki McDonald. Photographer: Leif Ekstrom, State Library of Queensland.

Richard Edwin Stringer AM (born 1936) is an Australian architectural photographer. He has made a significant contribution to the art and architectural photography of Queensland. Stringer's archive was acquired by the State Library of Queensland because the collection documents the history of Queensland's architectural practices.

== Biography ==
Stringer was born in Victoria in 1936. His initial interest in photography began during this time as an architectural student. He moved to Brisbane, Queensland in 1963 where he was employed by the University of Queensland working with architect James Birrell. He married his wife Marguerite in 1966 and in 1967 began his photographic practice, working to document historic and modern buildings. Through his work he has made a significant contribution to the art and architectural photography of Queensland. He has documented the majority of exhibitions at Brisbane's Institute of Modern Art and in 1984, was made an honorary life member. In 2002, he was made a Fellow of the Royal Australian Institute of Architects, and he was awarded an Honorary Doctor of Philosophy by the University of Queensland in 2003.

As part of his professional photography work, Stringer has covered many major urban and regional architectural features in Queensland. His photographs are held by the National Trust, the National Library of Australia, the State Library of Queensland, and many other cultural institutions and private collections.

In 2021 Stringer donated his personal archive (33218 Richard Stringer Architectural Photography Archive) to the State Library of Queensland. The collection contains photographic documentation of Queensland's built heritage from 1967 to 2021. In addition to thousands of architectural photographs depicting homes and buildings, the archive also includes industry, paintings, gardens, natural landscape, portraits, graphics, sailing and architectural ruins from throughout Queensland. There are also business records, exhibition prints, transparencies, albums, proof sheets, family photographs and some 63,000 negatives.

Stringer was appointed a Member of the Order of Australia in the 2026 Australia Day Honours for "significant service to architectural photography, to education, and to history".
