= South Bank, Queensland =

Precinct of Brisbane, Queensland, Australia

Coordinates: 27°28′31″S 153°01′13″E

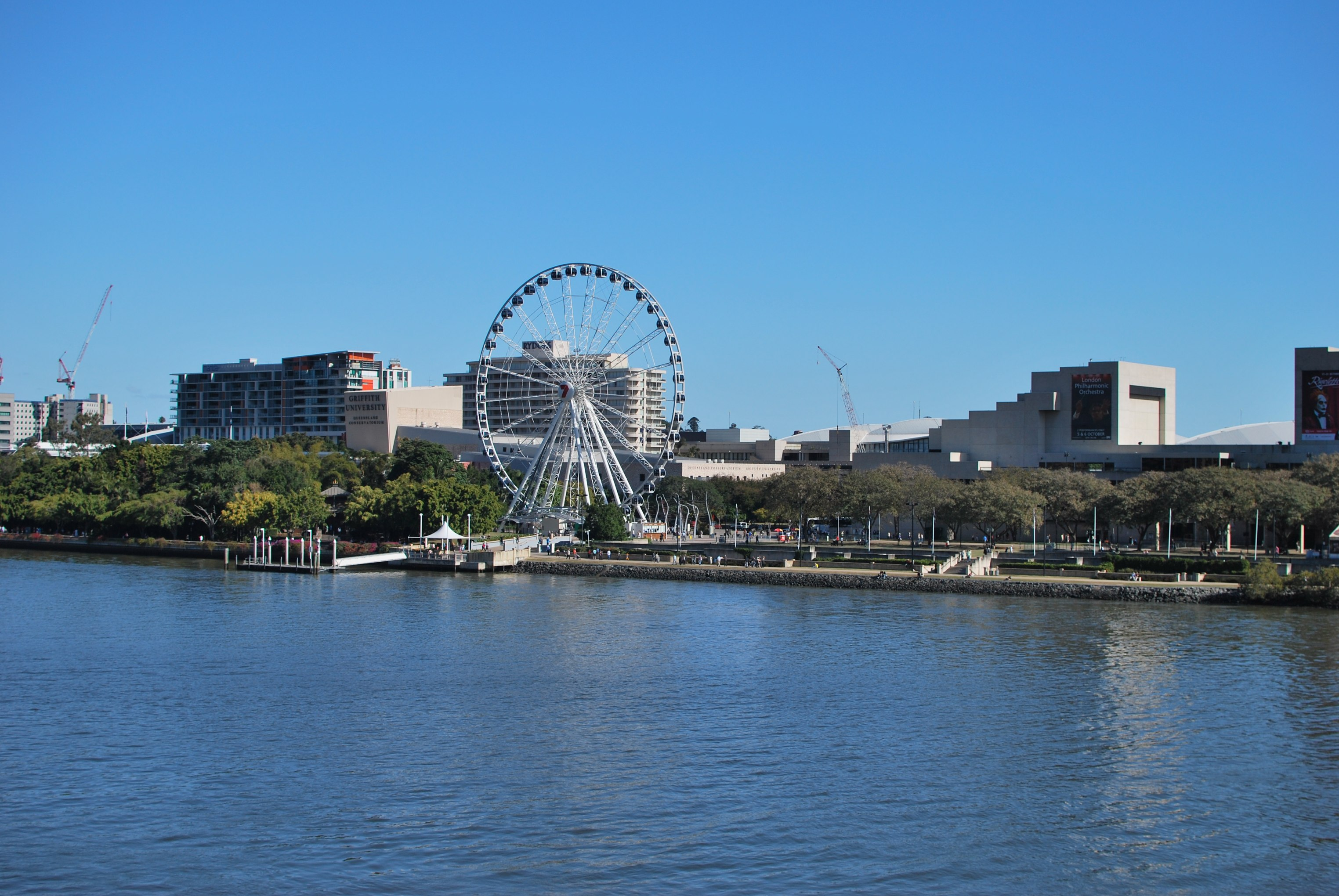
View of part of South Bank from the City.

South Bank is a cultural, social, educational and recreational precinct in Brisbane, Queensland, Australia. The precinct is located in the suburb of South Brisbane, on the southern bank of the Brisbane River.

== History ==
The South Bank area was a central point for immigration in Brisbane in the 1840s and by the 1850s had become the city's main business district. After the 1893 flood, the central business district was moved to the north side of the river. By the 1930s the area was a busy industrial area and port.

=== World Expo 88 and Parklands opening ===
In 1984, South Bank was chosen to host World Expo 88. The event lasted from 30 April to 30 October 1988 and brought in 18 million visitors during its run. After the expo was finished, the land where it was hosted was cleared and was originally going to be sold. However, public lobbying resulted in the site being turned into public parklands instead. On 20 June 1992 the South Bank Parklands were opened to the public.

On 31 August 2008 the Wheel of Brisbane, a 60-metre tall Ferris wheel was installed in the parklands. The wheel was installed to commemorate the 20th anniversary of Expo 88. The wheel was damaged in 2011 during a river flood.

== Landmarks ==
=== South Bank Parklands ===
The South Bank Parklands, which were established on the former site of World Expo 88, are one of Brisbane's most popular tourist attractions. The parklands are home to many restaurants and cafés as well as landmarks such as the Queensland Conservatorium, the Wheel of Brisbane, the Nepalese Peace Pagoda, Streets Beach (a free human-made swimming area), and the Grand Arbour. Approximately 11,000,000 people visit the South Bank Parklands each year.

=== Grey Street & Little Stanley Street ===
A number of Brisbane's most popular restaurants and fashion boutiques are located on Grey Street and Little Stanley Street, which runs parallel to it. The South Bank Cinemas are also located on Grey Street, along with two five star hotels. The Parklands Underground Carpark has more than 800 car parking spaces located off Little Stanley Street.

=== Brisbane Convention and Exhibition Centre ===
The Brisbane Convention & Exhibition Centre contains 44 meeting and event spaces, including four exhibition halls with a combined area of 20,000 m² and three stand alone tiered auditora. The venue has received 126 major industry awards, making it the most awarded convention centre in Australia. The centre has also been ranked among the top three convention centres world-wide by the Association Internationale des Palais de Congres (AIPC) on three occasions. The centre was also host to the G20 Leaders Summit in November 2014. It was named the World’s Best Convention Centre by the International Association of Congress Centres (AIPC) 2016 –2018.

=== Queensland Maritime Museum ===
The Queensland Maritime Museum is located next to the Goodwill Bridge at the southern end of the South Bank Parklands. It houses a two-level exhibition building, a library, a dry dock, a lighthouse and several retired vessels.

=== Queensland Cultural Centre ===
The Queensland Cultural Centre consists of:

- The Queensland Performing Arts Centre
- The Queensland Museum and Science Centre
- The Queensland Art Gallery
- The Queensland Gallery of Modern Art
- The State Library of Queensland

=== Griffith University ===
Griffith University has three campus facilities present in South Bank:

- The Queensland Conservatorium of Music, including the home of Opera Queensland
- The Griffith Film School
- The Queensland College of Art.

=== Neville Bonner Bridge ===
The Neville Bonner Bridge, a pedestrian bridge crossing the Brisbane River, connects the South Bank Parklands to the Queen's Wharf precinct in Brisbane's central business district.

== Transport ==
South Bank is serviced by Translink with ferry, bus and rail transit in the area.

- Ferries – CityCat and Cityferry on the Brisbane River at South Bank
- Buses – from South Bank busway station and Cultural Centre busway station
- Trains – from South Bank and South Brisbane railway stations

== Gallery ==
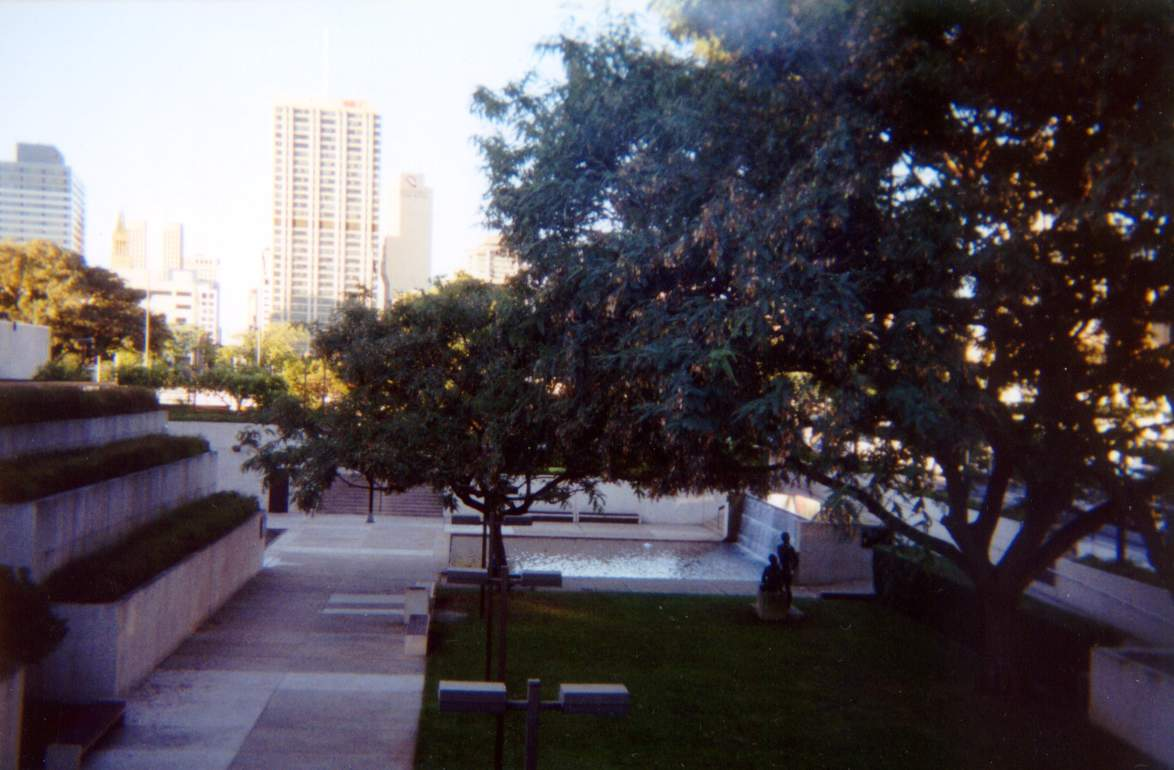
Outside the Queensland Art Gallery

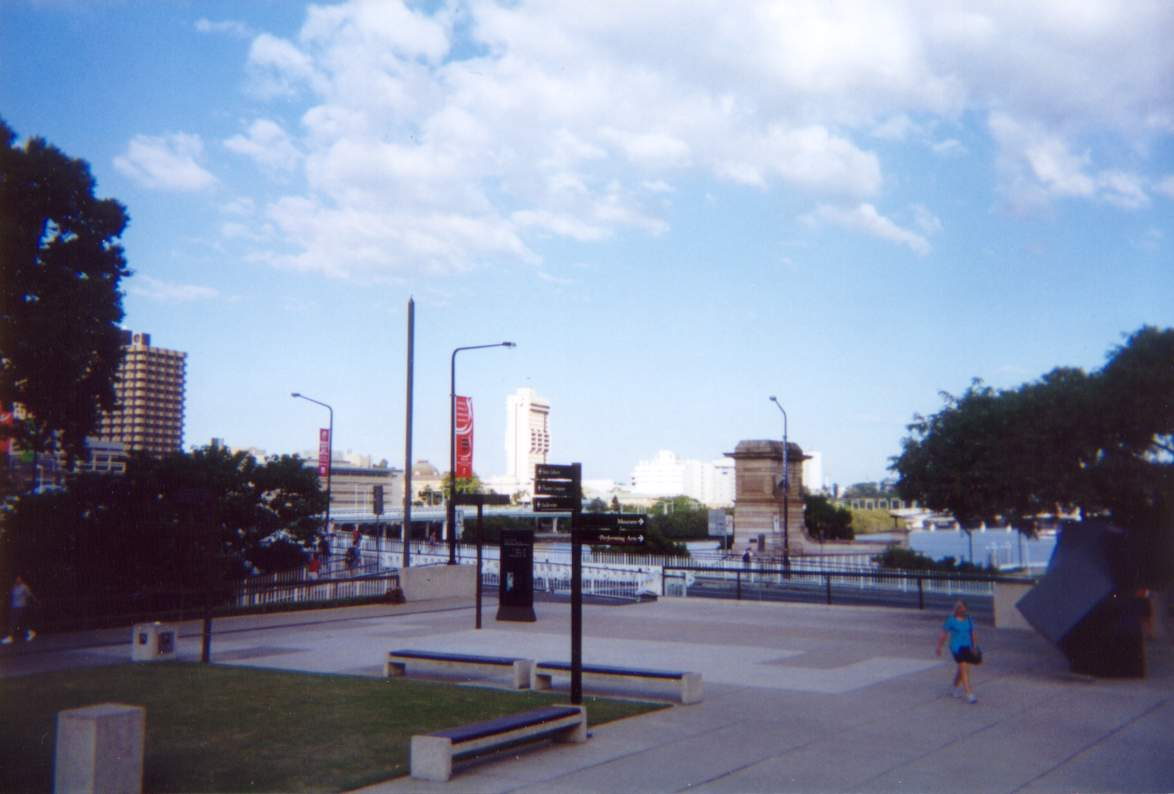
South Bank and the South Brisbane Cenotaph

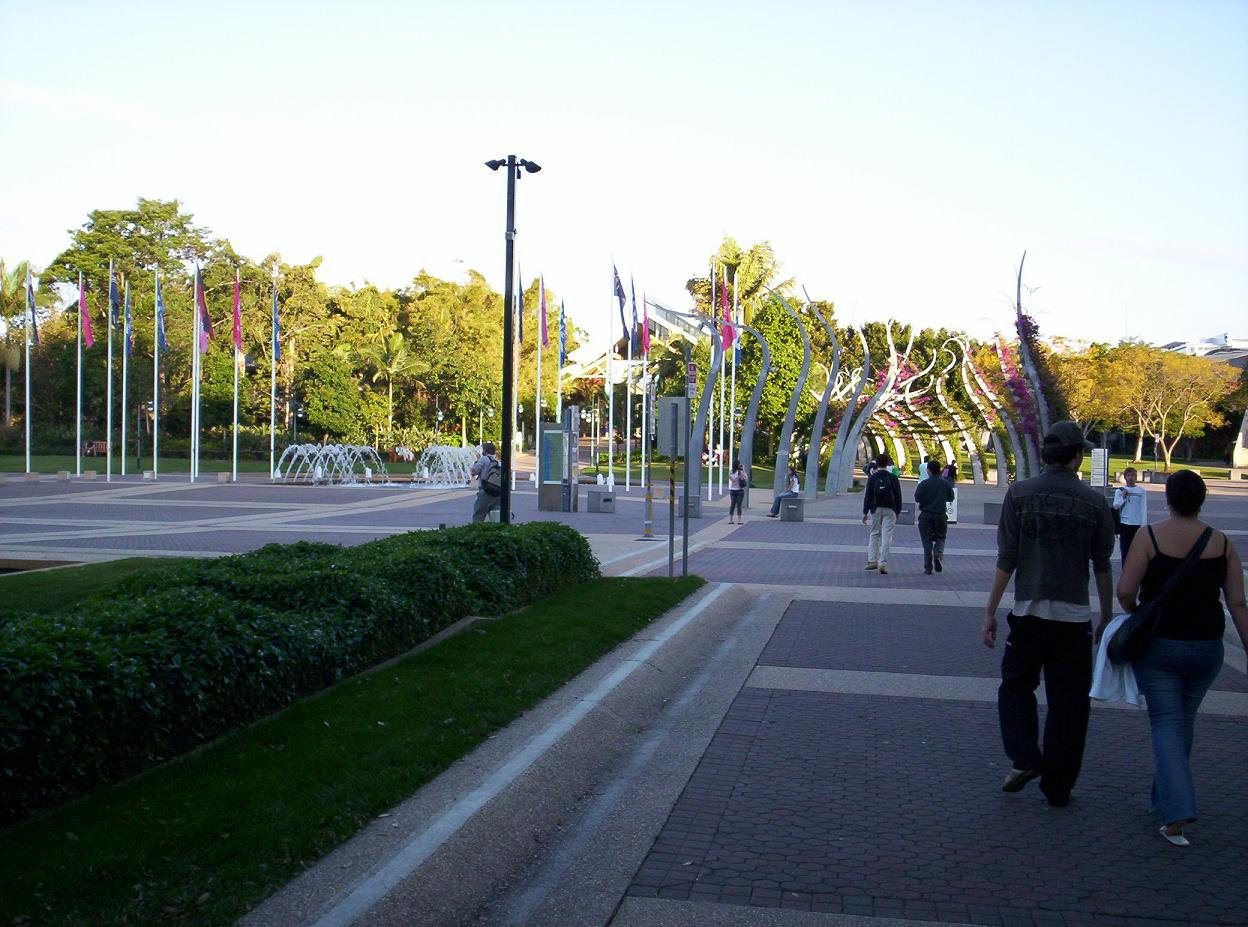
The Entrance to South Bank Parklands

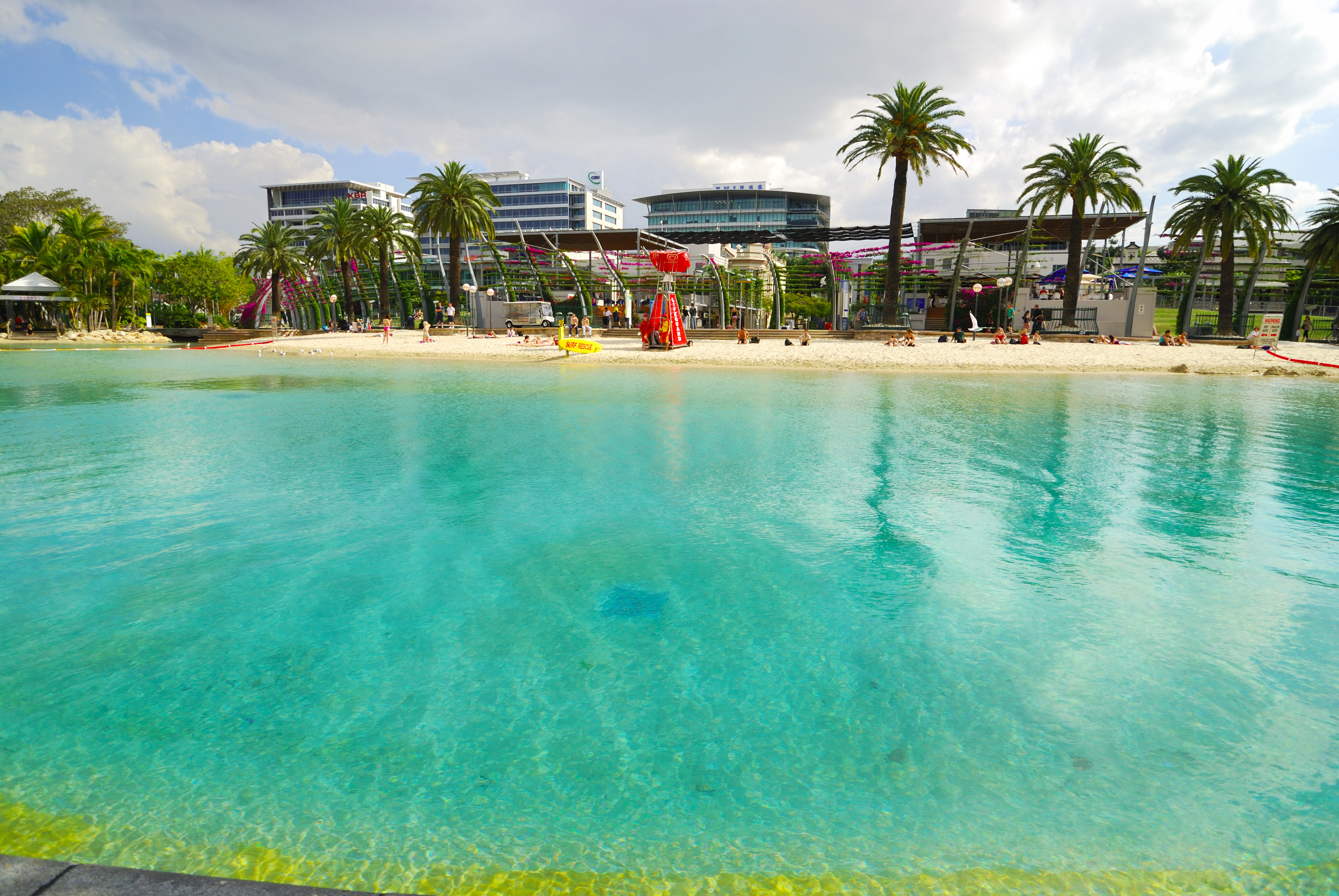
Streets Beach in the South Bank Parklands

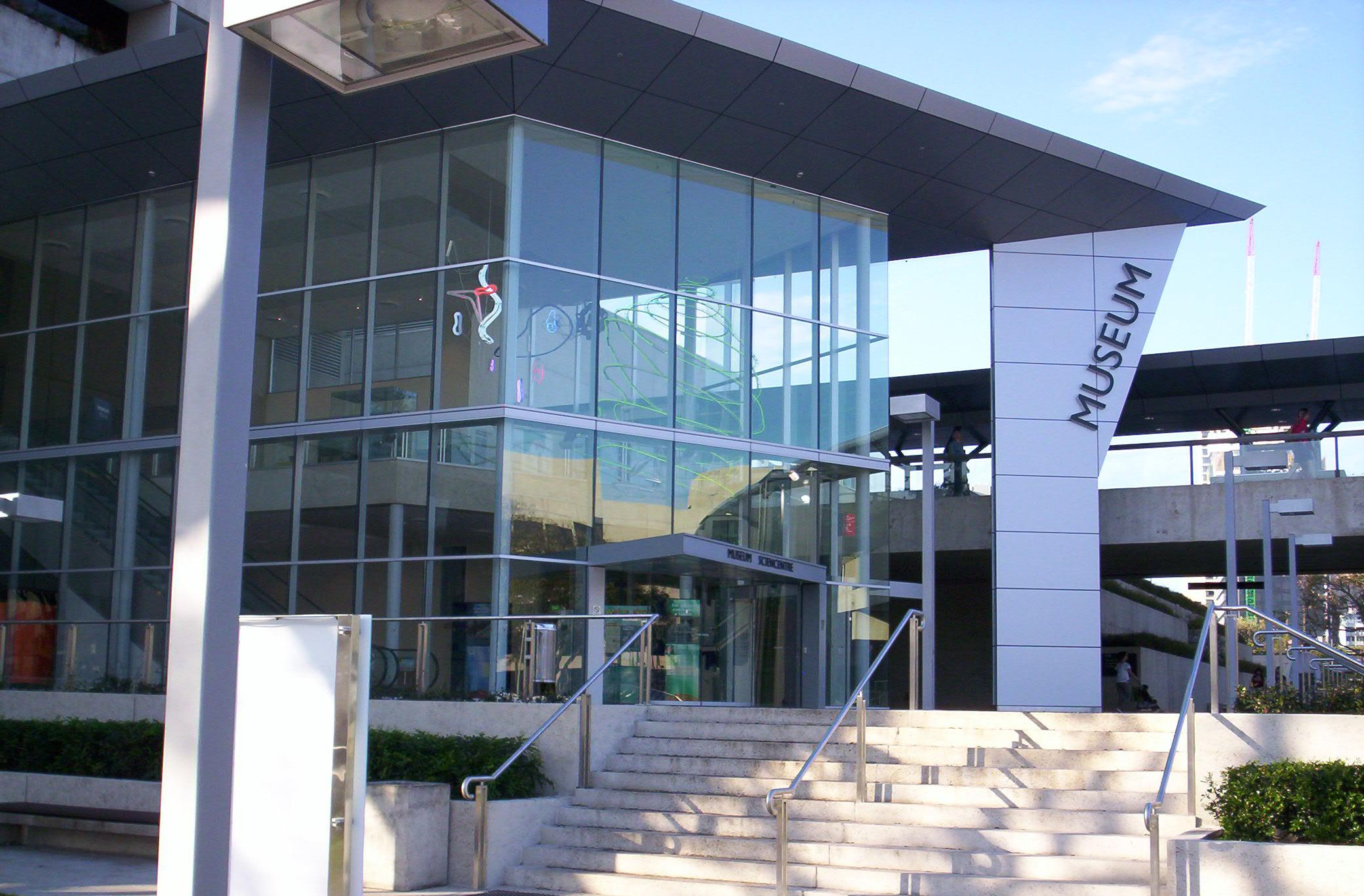
Queensland Museum

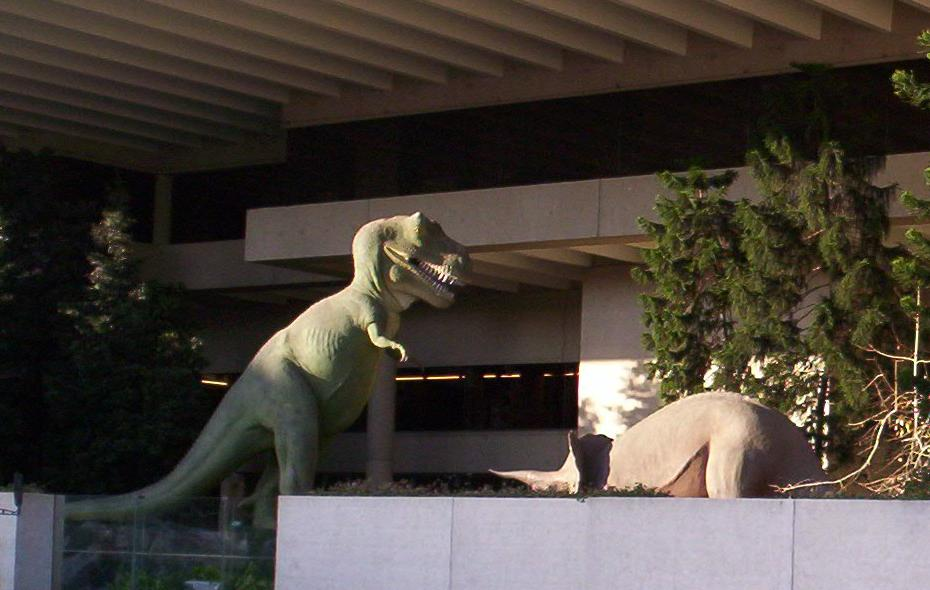
"Dinosaur Garden" at Queensland Museum

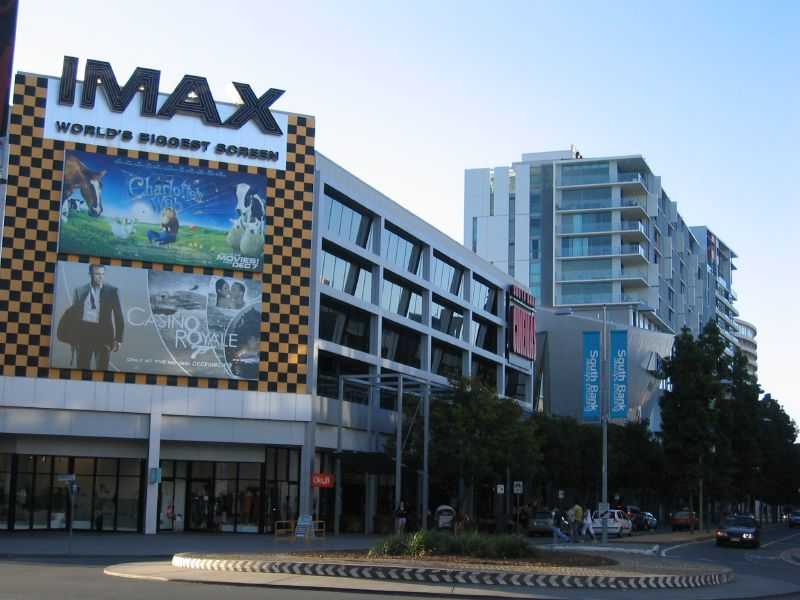
South Bank Cinemas on Grey Street

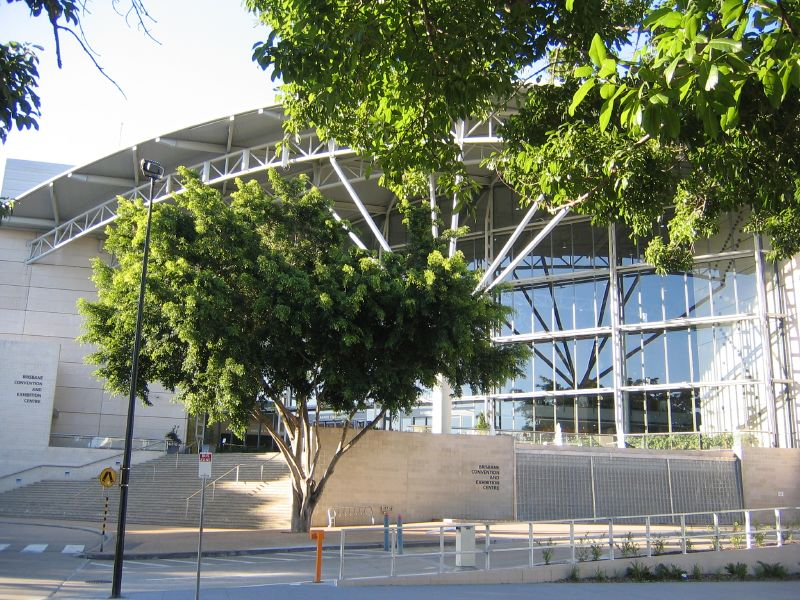
Entrance to Brisbane Exhibition and Convention Centre

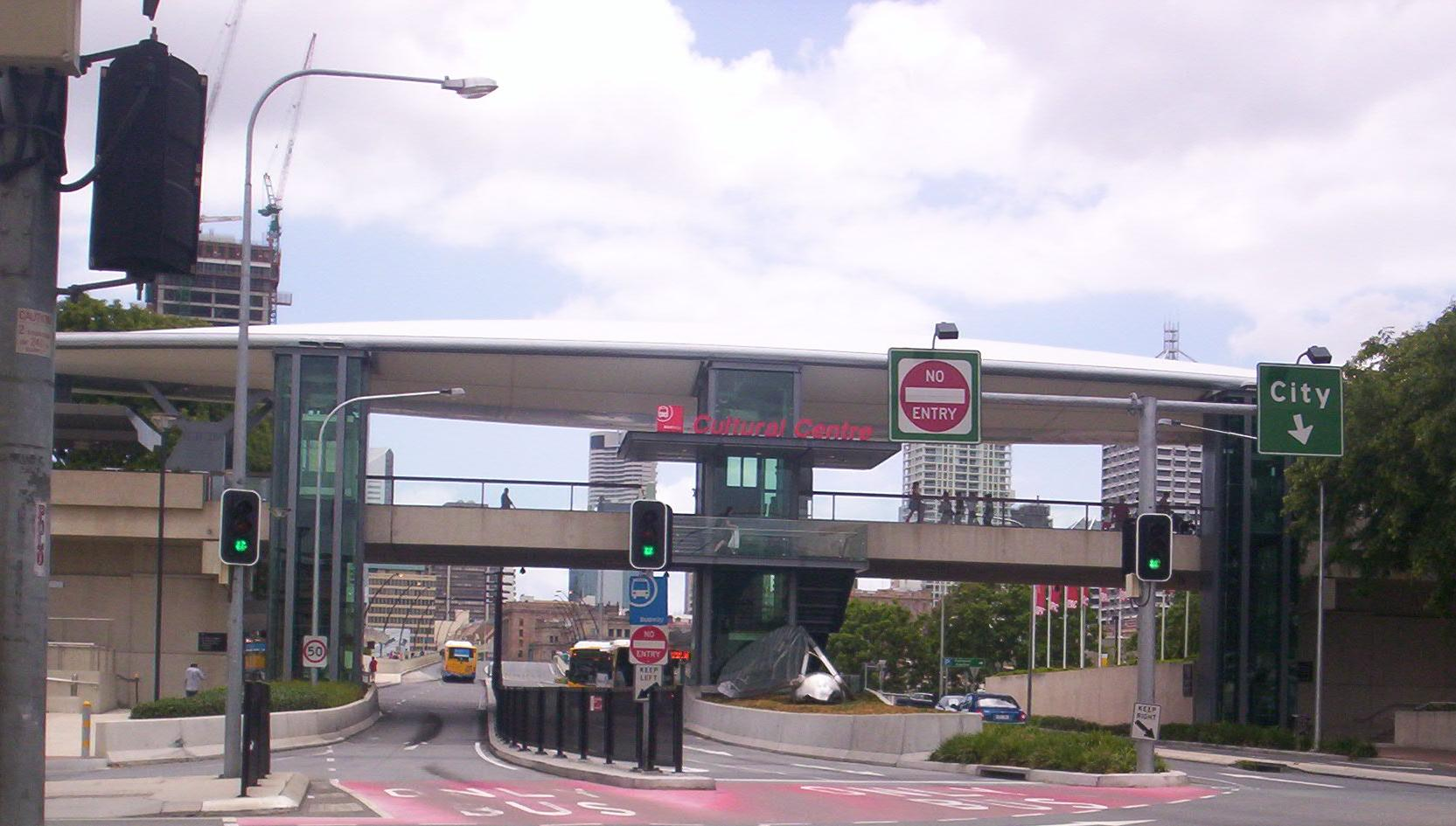
Cultural Centre Busway Station, the local busway station for South Bank
