= State Library of Queensland =

Main research and reference library in Queensland

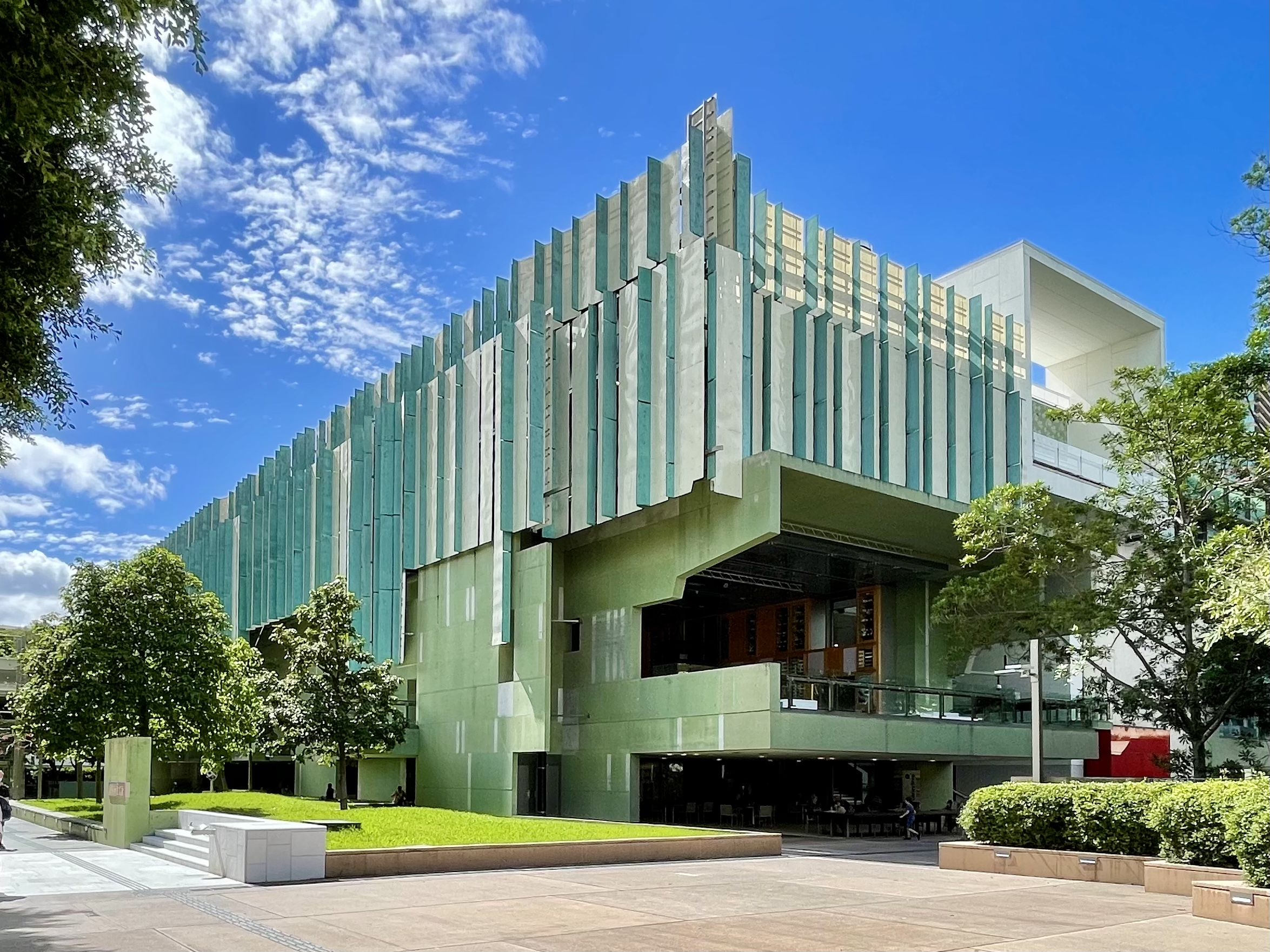
- The State Library building in South Brisbane
- Location: South Brisbane, Queensland, Australia
- Type: State library
- Established: 1896; 130 years ago

Other information
- Website: slq.qld.gov.au
- Building details
- Former names: The Brisbane Public Library; The Public Library of Queensland

General information
- Type: Public building
- Location: Cultural Precinct, South Brisbane, Queensland
- Construction started: 2004
- Completed: 2006
- Inaugurated: 25 November 2006

Technical details
- Floor count: 5
- Floor area: 28000m^{2}

Design and construction
- Architecture firm: Donovan Hill, Peddle Thorp
- Awards: RAIA Sir Zelman Cowen Award for Public Architecture 2007; RAIA Emil Sodersten Award for Interior Architecture 2007

State Library of Queensland (State Library) is the state public reference and research library of Queensland, Australia, operated by the state government. The Library is governed by the Library Board of Queensland, which draws its powers from the Libraries Act 1988. State Library is responsible for collecting and preserving a comprehensive collection of Queensland's cultural and documentary heritage, providing free access to information for all Queenslanders and for the advancement of public libraries across the state. The Library is at Kurilpa Point, within the Queensland Cultural Centre on the Brisbane River at South Bank.

== History ==
The Brisbane Public Library was established by the government of the Colony of Queensland in 1896, and was renamed the Public Library of Queensland in 1898. The library was opened to the public in 1902.

In 1934, the Oxley Memorial Library (now the John Oxley Library), named for the explorer John Oxley, opened as a centre for research and study relating specifically to Queensland. The Libraries Act 1943 established the Library Board of Queensland to manage the Public Library of Queensland; three years later, under the terms of The Oxley Memorial Library of Queensland Act, it took over management of the Oxley Memorial Library as well.

In March 1947, James L. Stapleton was appointed Queensland's first State Librarian. Stapleton advocated for a new building for the library and that library services should be free to the public.

In 1971, the "Public Library" became the "State Library". The following year, the Public Library Service was established to liaise with Queensland local governments regarding their public libraries; a subsidy for employing qualified staff in public libraries was also established. A few years later the Country Lending Service was established to provide book exchange and other services to public libraries in Queensland's smaller local government areas. Under the new name of Rural Libraries Queensland, the service is still going strong today.

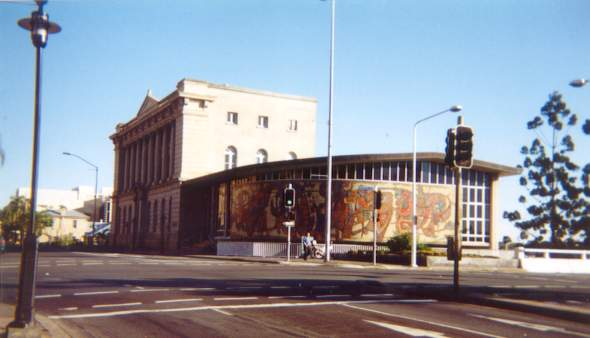
The old State Library with extension, built in the late 1950s

In 1988, the State Library relocated from the old State Library building in William Street in the Brisbane CBD to its present location in the Queensland Cultural Centre in South Brisbane.

In 2003, the State Library began a new mission of establishing Indigenous Knowledge Centres (IKCs) in the Cape York and Torres Strait areas. There is now a network of 22 IKCs in remote and regional communities: across Cape York, the islands of the Torres Strait, Central Queensland and at Cherbourg in South East Queensland.

Between 2006 and 2009, the library was extensively renovated both internally and externally, including the addition of a fifth floor, a large addition facing the river, and a new entrance. In 2010, the neighbouring riverside building housing the Fountain Room restaurant and an auditorium became part of the library and following some modifications was redesignated as "The Edge" and used to hold workshops, creative activities, events and exhibitions.

In early 2011, the library donated 50,000 pictures to Wikimedia Commons.

In 2022 State Library celebrated its 120th birthday.

== Architecture ==
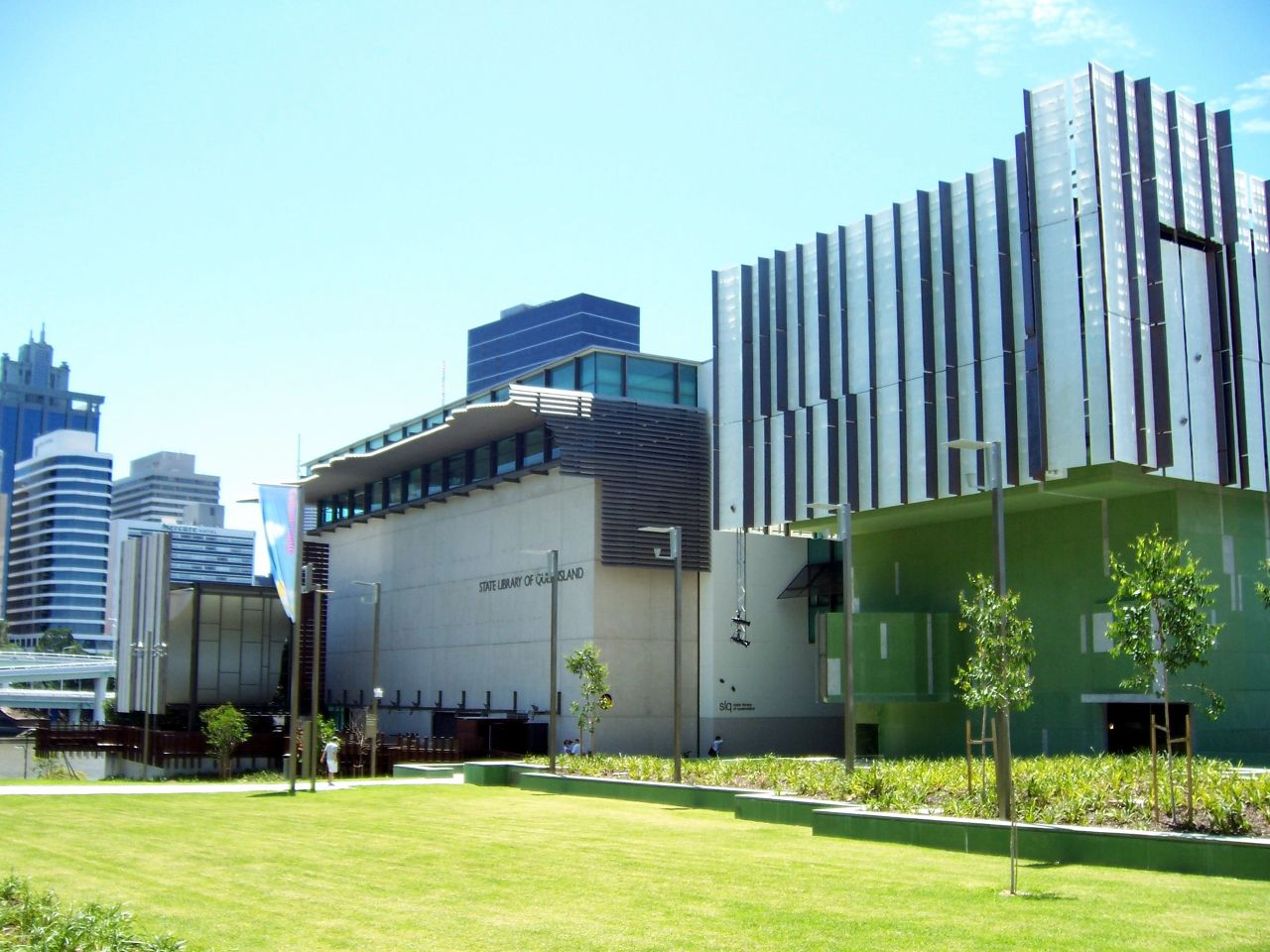
Northern end of the State Library of Queensland

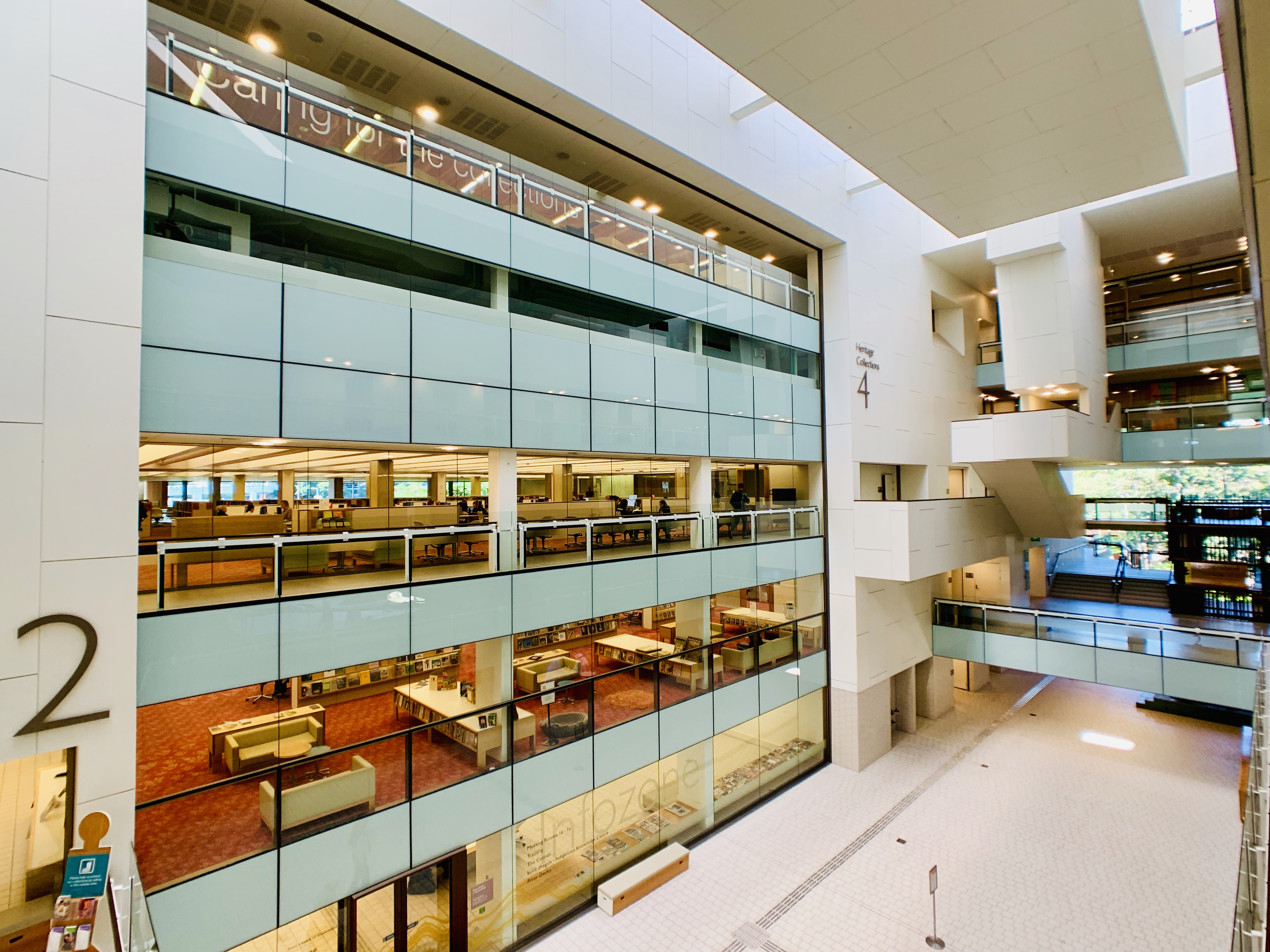
Interior of the State Library

The Brisbane Public Library moved into the Old State Library Building in William Street, Brisbane in 1899. This building had formerly been occupied by the Queensland Museum.

The Library originally shared accommodation in the building with an art gallery. In the late 1950s, an extension, with a distinctive tiled mural by Lindsay Edward on the exterior, was built onto the building to provide more space. The mural was the winning design in a national competition held in 1958.

In 1988, the year of Brisbane's World Expo 88, State Library of Queensland moved to a new home within the Queensland Cultural Centre at South Bank, near the Queensland Museum and the original Queensland Art Gallery, on the site of the former St Helen's Methodist Hospital, South Brisbane. This new building, a C-shaped edifice of straight-faced concrete and glass built around a mature Poinciana tree overlooking the Brisbane River, was the work of architectural firm, Robin Gibson and Partners, and marked the completion of Gibson's ambitious Queensland Cultural Centre project.

In 2004, work began on the Millennium Library Project - a major redevelopment of the existing State Library building. After three years of extensive redevelopment, the South Bank building officially re-opened on 25 November 2006.

This major redevelopment was the work of Brisbane-based architecture firms Donovan Hill and Peddle Thorp. Their work earned them several awards: the RAIA Sir Zelman Cowen Award for Public Architecture, 2007 (award for best public building in Australia); the RAIA Emil Sodersten Award for Interior Architecture, 2007; the RAIA Queensland Architecture Award for Brisbane Building of the Year 2007; the RAIA FDG Stanley Award for Public Buildings Architecture 2007; and the AIB Queensland Award for Project of the Year + Sustainability Commendation, 2007.

The Donovan Hill/Peddle Thorp additions transformed the State Library building, reconfiguring the entrance, adding another level and doubling its size with an additional 12,000 sqm of new space. Although the elements of the original Gibson scheme were preserved in the renovation, the building was deemed too altered to be included in the 2015 State Heritage Listing of the Cultural Centre.

The State Library building has since been described as an "open, generous knowledge place", and one of Australia's "most cherished public living rooms".

The building faces the Brisbane River and overlooks Stanley Place between the Queensland Art Gallery and the Queensland Gallery of Modern Art.

== Collection and services ==
State Library holds general collections, including books, journals and magazines, newspapers, audio-visual items, family history, maps, music, ephemera, Internet and electronic resources. There are research collections and services – including the John Oxley Library and the Australian Library of Art.

State Library's collection holds 7 significant collections, recognised for their importance by UNESCO's Australian Memory of the World Register:

- Margaret Lawrie Collection of Torres Strait Islands, 1964–1998
- Manifesto of the Queensland Labour Party, 1892
- The Convict Records of Queensland, 1825–1842
- James Tyson Papers, 1834–1965
- Anzac Day Commemoration Committee, 1916–1922
- The Johnstone Gallery Archive, 1948–1992
- Dr Barbara Piscitelli AM Children's Art Archive 1986–2016; 2020

State Library holds a number of significant collections of material documenting Queensland history;

- Queensland election-related material, including websites, posters, flyers and how-to-vote cards.
- Frank and Eunice Corley House Photographs Collection, which contained more than 60,000 photographs of Brisbane suburbia.
- Richard Stringer Architectural Photography Archive, includes over 63,000 photographic negatives and approximately 100,000 digital images, providing a substantial documentary record of Queensland's built heritage from 1967 to 2021.

=== Services ===
- Access to collections, including access to 50,000 copyright-free Queensland images through Wikimedia Commons
- Provides books and other resource material to public libraries throughout Queensland.
- Specialist services to public libraries in a number of areas, including services to young people and multicultural communities
- Public programs and exhibitions, including exhibition loans to schools, museums and other community organisations.
- Outreach programs in reference, research, information literacy, Internet training and digitisation throughout Queensland for public library staff and the general community.
- Library services to Aboriginal people and Torres Strait Islanders including the establishment of Indigenous Knowledge Centres primarily in Cape York and Torres Strait regions and increasing the employment and training opportunities for First Nations peoples in the library sector.
- A digital makerspace called The Edge.
- kuril dhagun Indigenous Knowledge Centre
- The Corner, an activities area for children under 8, their parents, carers, educators and friends.
- a free 'Ask a Librarian' enquiry service

=== Exhibitions ===
The library has hosted a number of prominent exhibitions, including:

- 100 not out: a century of Queensland sporting memories (3 August – 17 November 2002)
- A Few of our Favourite Things (25 November 2006 – 11 March 2007)
- Bold but Faithful: John Oxley Library at work (4 April – 11 October 2009)
- Transforming Tindale (6 September 2012 – 9 December 2012)
- Hot Modernism (9 July – 12 October 2014)
- Islands: hidden histories from Queensland Islands (30 June 2018 – 27 January 2019)
- Home: A Suburban Obsession (7 December 2018 – 14 July 2019)
- Plantation Voices (16 February – 8 September 2019)
- Legacy: Reflections on Mabo (28 May 2022 – 9 October 2022)
- Working Country (24 June 2023 – 28 January 2024)
- Purpose Built: Architecture for a better tomorrow (2 September 2023 – 14 April 2024)
- Brisbane Portrait Prize (3 August 2024 – 10 November 2024)
- Neon (6 December 2024 – 9 February 2025)
- All Shades: First Nations Portraiture (May 2025)
- The unbroken spirit of the Kalkadoons (22 March – 24 August 2025)

=== Tours ===
Free guided tours of the building are available.

=== Rural Libraries Queensland ===
Rural Libraries Queensland (formerly the Country Library Service) is a collaboration between State Library of Queensland and approximately 30 of the local government councils to provide library libraries to rural communities.

=== National edeposit (NED) ===
As a member library of National and State Libraries Australia, the organisation collaborated on the creation of the National edeposit (NED) system, which enables publishers from all over Australia to upload electronic publications as per the 2016 amendment to the Copyright Act 1968 and other regional legislation relating to legal deposit, and makes these publications publicly accessible online (depending on access conditions) from anywhere via Trove.

== Governance and structure ==
State Library of Queensland is governed by the Library Board of Queensland, which draws its powers from the Libraries Act 1988.

=== State librarians ===
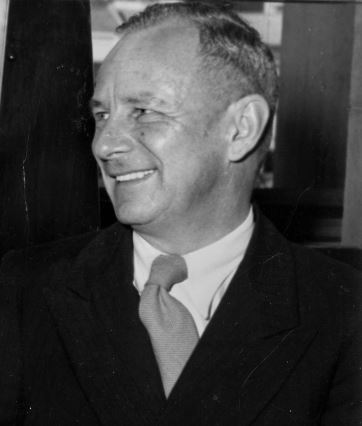
James Stapleton, state librarian, 1954

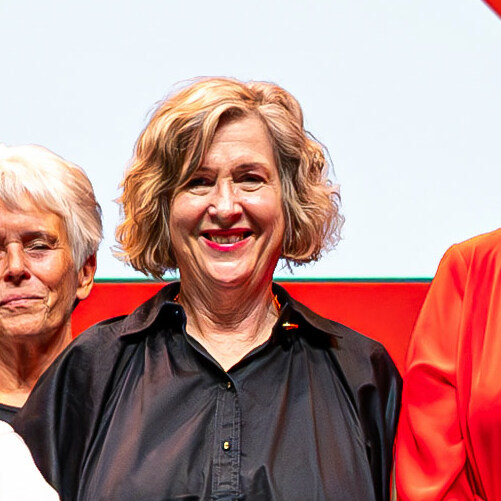
Vicki McDonald, state librarian, 2023

The state librarian is also the chief executive officer of the Library. The role has been held by the following people:

- James L. Stapleton, 1947–1970, the longest-serving state librarian
- Sydney Lawrence (Lawrie) Ryan 1970–1988
- Des Stephens, 1988–2001
- Lea Giles-Peters, 2001–2011, the first woman to be appointed to the position
- Janette Wright, 2012–2015
- Vicki McDonald AM FALIA, 2016–present

Corporate information

== Awards ==
=== Queensland Business Leaders Hall of Fame ===
In 2009 State Library of Queensland, the Queensland Library Foundation and QUT Business School at Queensland University of Technology collaborated to establish the Queensland Business Leaders Hall of Fame initiative. The QBLHOF recognises outstanding contributions made by organisations, companies and individuals to develop the Queensland economy and society, both contemporary and historical. A governing committee determines a list of inductees based on a set of criteria including:

- Sustained leadership
- Major financial contribution
- Pioneering
- Outstanding contribution
- Achievement of iconic status

The inductees are announced each year at a gala event. Since 2014 the QBLHOF has also awarded an annual fellowship, to recipients working on a research project that utilises the resources of the John Oxley Library to produce new interpretations of Queensland's business history.

=== Queensland Memory Awards ===
The Queensland Memory Awards recognise contributions to the documentation, preservation, and celebration of Queensland's memory – past and present – through fellowships and awards.

Fellowships support researchers and creatives of all kinds to interpret the significant collections of the John Oxley Library.

=== John Oxley Library Awards ===
The John Oxley Library Awards recognise outstanding contributions of individuals and organisations for outstanding contributions to documenting, preserving, and enhancing our understanding of Queensland's cultural heritage. Some notable past recipients include: Robert (Uncle Bob) Anderson, Jackie Huggins, Richard Stringer, and Matthew Condon.

=== black&write! Writing Fellowships ===
Two black&write! Writing Fellowships are awarded each year to Aboriginal and/or Torres Strait Islander writers living anywhere in Australia, based on unpublished manuscripts. Each winner is awarded $15,000 cash prize, plus editorial development with the black&write! team, as well as the opportunity to be published by the University of Queensland Press. Six writers are shortlisted on the basis of a specific manuscript. The fellowships, awarded since 2011, have been awarded to writers including Dakota Feirer, Jacob Gallagher, Susie Anderson, Tylissa Elisara, Carl Merrison, Lystra Rose, Nardi Simpson, Claire G. Coleman, Alison Whittaker, Jannali Jones, Jane Harrison, Jared Thomas, Tristan Savage, Teagan Chilcott, Sue McPherson, Ali Cobby Eckermann, Tori-Jay Mordey, and Jillian Boyd.

The award made headlines in 2025, when, just hours before the ceremony in Brisbane on 20 May, the library rescinded the fellowship to Martu author K. A. Ren Wyld (formerly known Karen Wyld), who is based in Adelaide, South Australia, on the instruction of Queensland Minister for the Arts John-Paul Langbroek. The decision was based on a 2024 tweet by Wyld about the killing of Hamas leader Yahya Sinwar by Israel. She later said that she was not fully aware who Sinwar was at the time, and thought that she had deleted the tweet afterwards. The premier, David Crisafulli, had also been involved in the decision. Following the announcement, several panel judges for the Queensland Literary Awards resigned, including Jeanine Leane and writer and critic Nigel Featherstone. A statement published on the library website by State Librarian and CEO Vicki McDonald on 22 May 2025 said the library had complied with the Minister's decision to rescind the fellowship, and "committed to undertake an independent review of the suite of awards and fellowships we administer", with a "specific focus on how we balance our strong commitment to freedom of expression and our role as a Queensland Government funded cultural institution". The Australian Society of Authors issued a statement condemning the action of the government, calling it "another alarming instance of the undermining of freedom of expression and arms-length arts funding". An open letter addressed to State Library and the arts minister, signed by many notable First Nations writers as well as non-Indigenous allies, demanded "an immediate apology be offered to Ren Wyld and to the black&write! team, and for the fellowship to be reinstated in full".

=== Other fellowships ===
Fellowships support researchers and creatives of all kinds to interpret the significant collections of the John Oxley Library. Through engagement and interaction with the collections, these interpretations provide new insights into the collection and contribute new knowledge about Queensland's history.

The premier fellowship, the John Oxley Library Fellowship, has been awarded since 2004.

Other fellowships with a historical focus include:

- Monica Clare Research Fellowship (First Nations history)
- Rainbow Research Fellowship (LGBTIQA+ history)
- Queensland Heritage Register Fellowship (built heritage)
- Queensland Business Leaders Hall of Fame Fellowship (business and economic history)
- Digital collections catalyst (use of digital collections and data)
- Christina Boughen OAM Fellowship (use of the Robert Boughen OBE and Christina Boughen OAM Collection)
- Letty Katts Fellowship (music history)
- Royal Queensland Show (Ekka) Fellowship

Research outcomes are published on the John Oxley Library blog.

== See also ==
- State Library donation of images to Wikimedia Commons in December 2010
- Walker, Paul. Millennium Library [Donovan Hill and Peddle Thorp rework Robin Gibson's State Library of Queensland edifice] Architecture Australia, Vol 96 No 2 Mar/Apr 2007, pp. 64–73.
- State Library of Victoria
- State Library of Western Australia
- State Library of South Australia
- State Library of Tasmania
- State Library of New South Wales
