= Lindsay Edward =

Australian artist (1919–2007)

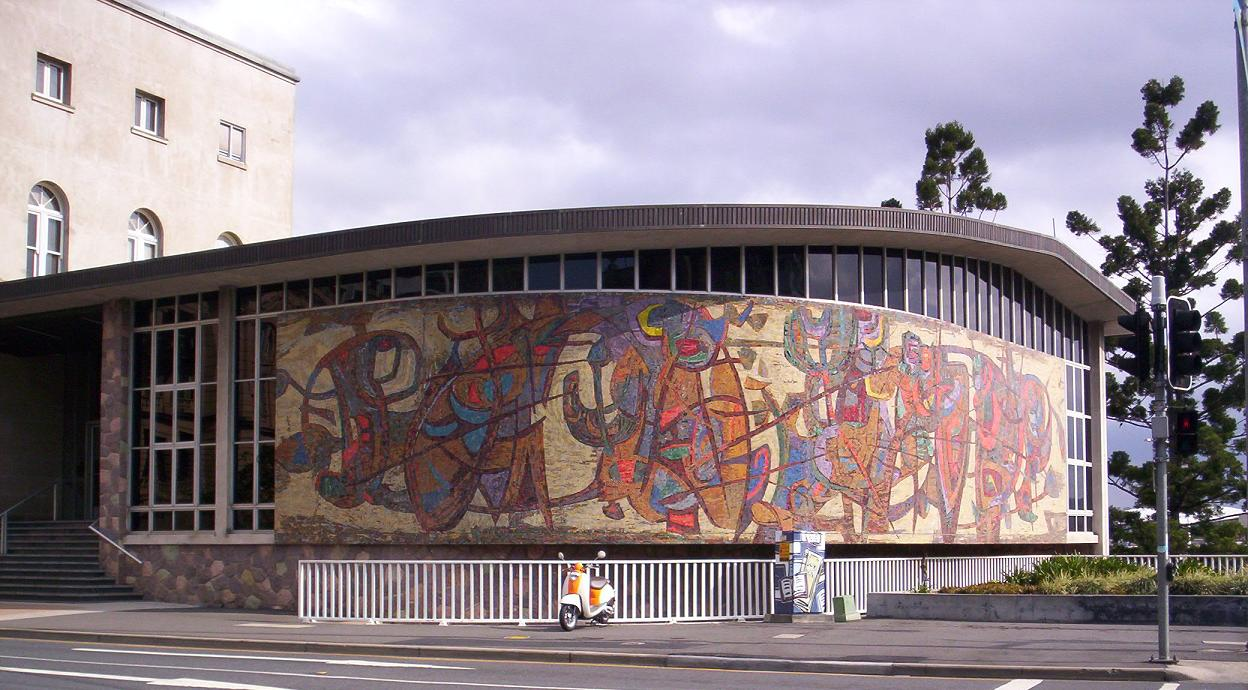
Glass mosaic mural by Lindsay Edward on former State Library building

Lindsay M. Edward (1919–2007) was an Australian abstract artist, mosaicist and teacher. He was born in Victoria on 26 August 1919.

Edward studied at the National Gallery Art School from 1938 to 1941 under Charles Wheeler and W.B. McInnes. For 31 years he was associated with the Art School at the Royal Melbourne Technical College (and former Working Men's College) now known as RMIT, where he had been a student, and where he was teacher 1947–1954, head of painting, 1954–67 and head of school 1967–79. As head of the art department, Edward set up an initiative for systematically developing the RMIT Art Collection, and to make Australian art more accessible to staff and students. He retired from RMIT in August 1979, after which he made many painting trips to Australia's outback.

His semi-abstract work was exhibited widely in Melbourne, Sydney and Perth and described by Professor Bernard Smith as "a perceptive art with its own quiet distinction". He described his approach to abstraction as simply wanting "to place sequences of shapes, colours and tones on a surface in an abstract manner, like the notes of a Bach fugue".

Edward also undertook mural commissions for the Victoria Housing Commission, and for church mosaic panels. One of his murals made of glass mosaic tiles can be seen on the old State Library of Queensland building at 159 William St, Brisbane. This was the winning entry in an Australia-wide competition for a mural to adorn the walls of the Brisbane Public Library in time for the 100-year celebration of responsible government in Queensland in 1959. On winning the competition in 1958, Edward explained that his mosaic design was "not a literal subject, but one suggesting basic primitive organic forms, ageless, belonging to no particular age, indicative of growth and development'. Photographs of the winning mural were exhibited in Melbourne at Gallery A in September 1960, and were thought to "reveal a quality in design related in strength to figure compositions on Greek pottery". This mural contributed to the listing of the former State Library Building on the State Heritage Register in 1992. At 20.7 by 4.4 metres (68 ft x 14 1/2 ft), Edward's mosaic mural is the largest in Queensland, (the second largest being the Anzac Square mosaic mural), and is discussed in the book Monumental Queensland: sign posts on a cultural landscape. A close-up image of the mural taken by Graham de Gruchy can be seen at the UQ eSpace Library.

Edward had around 20 solo exhibitions of his work between 1944 and 1993. In the 1950s he showed paintings at many Melbourne galleries, including Stanley Coe Gallery, Peter Bray Gallery, the Victorian Artists' Society Galleries, and Gallery A. In the 1970s he exhibited in other Melbourne galleries - the Warehouse Galleries, Realities Galleries and Powell St Gallery and in the 1980s and 1990s at David Ellis and the Eastgate Galleries in Hawthorn. In Sydney he exhibited at the Holdsworth Gallery and in Perth, the Quentin Gallery. He also exhibited at the RMIT Gallery in October 1979 on the occasion of his retirement.

His work is held in numerous collections, including the National Gallery of Victoria, the National Gallery of Australia, ArtBank, and several regional and tertiary galleries in Victoria, including RMIT.

Lindsay Edward died on 9 January 2007. His obituary was written by Jenny Zimmer who taught art history at RMIT during his time there, and was published in The Age.
