= Voice of Hope =

- Cover of the artist's debut album internationally showing "Pumeza" as a stage name

Studio album by Pumeza
- Released: 3 March 2014 (Germany, Austria, Switzerland; 6 October 2014 (International)
- Recorded: 2013–2014
- Label: Decca Records

Pumeza chronology
Voice of Hope (2014)	Arias (2016)

Singles from Voice of Hope
- 1. "God Bless Africa" Released: 2013

Germany, Austria, Switzerland release
- Cover of special release to German, Austrian and Swiss markets

Voice of Hope is a 2014 album by South African opera singer Pumeza Matshikiza. The album was released on Decca Records.

== Releases and contents ==
The album was first released in Germany, Austria and Switzerland on 3 March 2014 with 18 tracks. An international edition was released later with a different cover and an amended order of track list and just 15 tracks.

The album includes four arias ("O mio babbino caro", "Signore, ascolta!" and "Donde lieta uscì" from Puccini and "Vedrai, carino" from Mozart) all with musical accompaniment from Staatsorchester Stuttgart and Simon Hewett. The other tracks are mostly performed with the accompaniment of Aurora Orchestra and Iain Farrington. There is also the song "Lakutshon Ilanga (When The Sun Sets)" performed with Royal Liverpool Philharmonic and Iain Farrington.

The last track of the international album, "Freedom Come All Ye" was a collaboration and performed by Pumeza Matshikiza with Sura Susso, Mamadou Ndiaye Cissokho, Fiona Hamilton and Phil Cunningham.

The earlier version destined for German, Austrian and Swiss markets contains four tracks that have not been included in the international release, namely "Ntyilo Ntyilo (Little Bird)", "Baxabene Oxam (Click Song 2)", "Senzeni Na? (What Have We Done?)" and the South African national anthems "Nkosi Sikelel' iAfrika (God Bless Africa)". In two of these tracks, "Senzeni Na?" and "Nkosi Sikelel' iAfrika", she invited the African Children's Choir to sing with her.

== Track listing ==
The international edition contains 15 tracks. A special edition was released for Germany, Austria and Switzerland with a different cover and with three additional tracks not found on the international release.

=== International release ===
Track #	Title / Alternative title	Composer	Aria from	Additional credits	Length
1.	"O mio babbino caro"	Giacomo Puccini	Aria of Gianni Schicchi	with Staatsorchester Stuttgart & Simon Hewett	2:04
2.	"Signore, ascolta!"	Giacomo Puccini	Aria of Liù from Turandot, Act I	with Staatsorchester Stuttgart & Simon Hewett	2:49
3.	"Thula Baba" ("Hush, My Baby")	Traditional		with Aurora Orchestra & Iain Farrington	3:11
4.	"Malaika" ("My Angel")	William Fedhile		with Aurora Orchestra & Iain Farrington	2:47
5.	"Pata Pata"	Miriam Makeba; Jerry Ragovoy		with Aurora Orchestra & Iain Farrington	2:10
6.	"The Naughty Little Flea"	Norman Byfield Thomas		with Aurora Orchestra & Iain Farrington	3:08
7.	"Vedrai, carino"	Wolfgang Amadeus Mozart	Aria of Zerlina from Don Giovanni, K. 527, Act II	with Staatsorchester Stuttgart & Simon Hewett	3:28
8.	"Donde lieta uscì"	Giacomo Puccini	Aria of Mimi from La Boheme, Act III	with Staatsorchester Stuttgart & Simon Hewett	3:07
9.	"Umzi Watsha" ("The House Is Burning")	Kevin Volans		with Aurora Orchestra & Iain Farrington	3:28
10.	"Saduva" ("Hush, I Hear You")	MacKay Davashe		with Aurora Orchestra & Iain Farrington	2:43
11.	"Holilili"	Alan Silinga		with Aurora Orchestra & Iain Farrington	3:12
12.	"Qongqothwane" ("The Click Song")	Nathan Mdledle; Joseph Mogotsi; Rufus Khoza; Ronnie Sehume		with Aurora Orchestra & Iain Farrington	2:27
13.	"Iya Gaduza"	Miriam Makeba		with Aurora Orchestra & Iain Farrington	1:39
14.	"Lakutshon Ilanga" ("When The Sun Sets")	Mackay Davasche		with the Royal Liverpool Philharmonic & Iain Farrington	3:28
15.	"Freedom Come All Ye"	Hamish Henderson		with Sura Susso, Mamadou Ndiaye Cissokho, Fiona Hamilton, Phil Cunningham	4:19

=== Germany, Austria and Switzerland release ===
Track #	Title / Alternative title	Composer	Aria from	Additional credits	Length
1.	"Thula Baba" ("Hush, My Baby")	Traditional		with Aurora Orchestra & Iain Farrington	3:11
2.	"O mio babbino caro"	Giacomo Puccini	Aria of Gianni Schicchi	with Staatsorchester Stuttgart & Simon Hewett	2:04
3.	"Malaika" ("My Angel")	William Fedhile		with Aurora Orchestra & Iain Farrington	2:47
4.	"Vedrai, carino"	Wolfgang Amadeus Mozart	Aria of Zerlina from Don Giovanni, K. 527, Act II	with Staatsorchester Stuttgart & Simon Hewett	3:28
5.	"Lakutshon Ilanga" ("When The Sun Sets")	Mackay Davasche		with the Royal Liverpool Philharmonic & Iain Farrington	3:28
6.	"Ntyilo Ntyilo" ("Little Bird")	Allan Silinga		with Aurora Orchestra & Iain Farrington	3:32
7.	"Donde lieta uscì"	Giacomo Puccini	Aria of Mimi from La Boheme, Act III	with Staatsorchester Stuttgart & Simon Hewett	3:07
8.	"Holilili"	Alan Silinga		with Aurora Orchestra & Iain Farrington	3:12
9.	"The Naughty Little Flea"	Norman Byfield Thomas		with Aurora Orchestra & Iain Farrington	3:08
10.	"Qongqothwane" ("The Click Song")	Nathan Mdledle; Joseph Mogotsi; Rufus Khoza; Ronnie Sehume		with Aurora Orchestra & Iain Farrington	2:27
11.	"Umzi Watsha" ("The House Is Burning")	Kevin Volans		with Aurora Orchestra & Iain Farrington	3:28
12.	"Saduva" ("Hush, I Hear You")	MacKay Davashe		with Aurora Orchestra & Iain Farrington	2:43
13.	"Pata Pata"	Miriam Makeba; Jerry Ragovoy		with Aurora Orchestra & Iain Farrington	2:10
14.	"Baxabene Oxam" ("Click Song 2")	Miriam Makeba		with Aurora Orchestra & Iain Farrington	2:06
15.	"Senzeni Na?" ("What Have We Done?")	Albert Nyathi		with African Children's Choir, Jesse Kirabo, Dirk Brosse	3:07
16.	"Nkosi Sikelel' iAfrika" ("God Bless Africa")	Enoch Sontonga		with African Children's Choir; Dirk Brosse	2:25
17.	"Umhome" ("Nowhere to Go")	Miriam Makeba			2:25
18.	"Signore, ascolta!"	Giacomo Puccini	Aria of Liù from Turandot, Act I	with Staatsorchester Stuttgart & Simon Hewett	2:49

== Charts ==
Chart (2014)	Peak position
Danish Albums (Hitlisten)	12
French Albums (SNEP)	188
Scottish Albums (OCC)	25
UK Albums (OCC)	71
