= Pumeza Matshikiza =

South-African operatic soprano (born 1979)

- Born: 27 February 1979 (age 47); Lady Frere, South Africa
- Education: South African College of Music, Royal College of Music
- Occupation: Opera singer (soprano)
- Website: pumezamatshikiza.com

Pumeza Matshikiza (born 27 February 1979) is a South African operatic soprano. A graduate of the Royal College of Music and a member of the Royal Opera's Jette Parker Young Artists Programme from 2007 to 2009, she made her début as a flower maiden in Parsifal and has gone on to sing leading soprano roles with Stuttgart Opera. Matshikiza has released two solo albums on the Decca Classics label.

== Career ==
Matshikiza was born in Lady Frere, South Africa. She studied at the University of Cape Town College of Music, graduated cum laude under Professor Virginia Davids, then at the Royal College of Music, London, with a full three-year scholarship and in the Young Artist Programme at the Royal Opera House, Covent Garden, where she made her début as a flower maiden in Parsifal. Winner of the Veronica Dunne International Singing Competition in Dublin in 2010, Pumeza later joined the Stuttgart Opera, where she has been part of the full-time ensemble since 2011, performing Pamina in Die Zauberflöte, Susanna in Le nozze di Figaro, Mimì in La bohème, Micaëla in Carmen.

Signing with the London-based label Decca in 2013, she recorded her debut album, Pumeza – Voice of Hope, at Abbey Road Studios.

She sang one of the Innocents in the 2008 première of Harrison Birtwistle's The Minotaur, and her first major role was that of Mimì at the Edinburgh Festival in 2010 in a production by Opera Bohemia. There she was described as "the real star of the show ... who plays the role of Mimì ... with a rich, lustrous voice. She also sang at the wedding of Albert II, Prince of Monaco, and Charlene Wittstock, accompanied by French guitarist Eric Sempe and percussionist Patrick Mendez. She was a South Bank Sky Arts Breakthrough Award in 2011. Pumeza performed a rendition of "Freedom Come-All-Ye" at the opening ceremony of the 2014 Commonwealth Games, which was viewed by one billion people worldwide. The song refers to Nyanga, one of the oldest black townships in Cape Town, which is also one of the places where Pumeza grew up as a child. Speaking about the song afterwards, she said: "The song ... is not one I was even aware of until I was given it to rehearse but it is so beautiful. I love what the song stands for – freedom for everyone regardless of race or social standing or nationality."

She released her debut studio album, Voice of Hope in 2014 on Decca Records and containing four classical arias from Puccini and Mozart, in addition to mainly African popular and traditional. The Staatsorchester Stuttgart and Simon Hewett accompany her for the arias, whereas the Aurora Orchestra and Iain Farrington accompany her for most of the songs, with one song with the Royal Liverpool Philharmonic.

== Discography ==
=== Studio albums ===
List of studio albums, with selected chart positions
Title	Album details	Peak chart positions				Certifications
Title	Album details	DEN	FRA	SCO	UK	Certifications
Voice of Hope	Released: 21 March 2014 (GER, AT, SWI); Label: Decca Records; Formats: CD, digital download	12	188	25	71	
Arias	Released: 6 May 2016; Label: Decca Records; Formats: CD, digital download	—	—	—	—	
"—" denotes a recording that did not chart or was not released in that territory.

=== Singles ===
Title	Year	Album
"God Bless Africa"	2013	Voice of Hope

=== Music videos ===
Title	Year	Album
"God Bless Africa" "Thula Baba (Hush, My Baby)" "O mio babbino caro"	2014	Voice of Hope
"Dvorák: Song to the Moon" "Hahn: A Chloris" "Après un rêve, Op. 7, No. 1" "Tuning in"	2016	Arias
