= Hannah Miller =

American figure skater

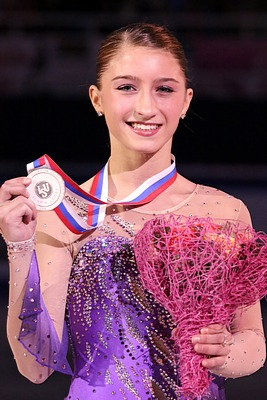
- Miller in 2012

Personal information
- Born: October 29, 1996 (age 29) Chicago, Illinois, U.S.
- Home town: Williamston, Michigan, U.S.
- Height: 5 ft 0 in (1.52 m)

Figure skating career
- Country: United States
- Coach: Tammy Gambill
- Skating club: East West Ice Palace
- Began skating: 2000
Medal record
Figure skating: Ladies' singles
Representing United States
Junior Grand Prix Final
Silver medal – second place	2012–13 Sochi	Ladies' singles

Hannah Miller (born October 29, 1996) is an American figure skater. She is the 2014 Ice Challenge champion, 2014 Lombardia Trophy silver medalist, and 2012 JGP Final silver medalist.

== Personal life ==
Miller was born in Chicago, Illinois, while her father was a member of the National Hockey League's Chicago Blackhawks. She is the daughter of Cheryl Hudgens Miller and Kevin Miller, a former ice hockey player who was a member of the 1988 U.S. Olympic team and played in the NHL. She has three younger sisters, Neysa and twins Braedyn and Giselle. In June 2015, Miller graduated from Williamston High School, having earned a GPA of 4.0 and served as valedictorian at her graduation. She decided to study kinesiology at Michigan State University.

== Career ==
Miller began learning to skate as a four-year-old. She also trained in gymnastics before deciding to focus on skating. She was coached mainly by her paternal aunt, Kirsten Miller-Zisholz, in Lansing, Michigan, until June 2015.

Miller won the 2011 U.S. novice title. The next season, she won a bronze medal in her Junior Grand Prix debut and the U.S. junior national bronze medal.

In 2012–13, Miller won a pair of silver medals at JGP events in Austria and Croatia and qualified for the 2012–13 Junior Grand Prix Final in Sochi, Russia. She won the silver medal after placing second in the short program and fourth in the long. She made her senior national debut at the 2013 U.S. Championships, finishing 10th.

In September 2014, making her senior international debut, Miller took the silver medal at the Lombardia Trophy, an ISU Challenger Series (CS) event in Sesto San Giovanni, Italy. In November, she won gold at the CS Ice Challenge in Graz, Austria.

In June 2015, Miller relocated to Artesia, California, to train under Rafael Arutyunyan. Miller-Zisholz, who encouraged her to move to a more competitive training environment, continues to work with Miller as an adviser and technical consultant. In August 2016, Miller announced a coaching change to Tammy Gambill.

== Programs ==
Season	Short program	Free skating
2018–2019	La Rosa by Vale Tango choreo. Hannah Miller, Massimo Scali	Rain, In Your Black Eyes by Ezio Bosso choreo. by Daniil Barantsev
2017–2018	Torn by Nathan Lanier choreo. by Daniil Barantsev	The Hanging Tree (from The Hunger Games: Mockingjay – Part 1) by James Newton Howard; Everybody Wants to Rule the World performed by Lorde; There are Worse Games to Play (from The Hunger Games: Mockingjay – Part 2) by James Newton Howard choreo. by Tom Dickson
2016–2017	Arabesque by Roni Benise choreo. by Tom Dickson	Spring Wind; The Unbending Chinese Tree; Ad Martem by Balázs Havasi choreo. by Nadia Kanaeva
2015–2016	Arabesque by Roni Benise choreo. by Tom Dickson; Big Spender (from Sweet Charity) performed by Gwen Verdon choreo. by Rohene Ward	Puccini's opera arias: Prelude; Si, Mi Chiamano Mimi (from La bohème) performed by Mirella Freni; Non piangere, Liù (from Turandot); Visi D'arte (from Tosca) choreo. by Tom Dickson
2014–2015	The Firebird by Igor Stravinsky	Perseverance by Michele McLaughlin; Illumination by Jennifer Thomas
2013–2014	The Firebird by Igor Stravinsky	Primavera by Ludovico Einaudi
2012–2013	Tanguera by Sexteto Mayor	The Storm by Balázs Havasi
2011–2012	Danse macabre by Camille Saint-Saëns	Masquerade Waltz by Aram Khachaturian
2010–2011	Singin' in the Rain by Mark Hale	Piano Fantasy by William Joseph

== Competitive highlights ==
GP: Grand Prix; CS: Challenger Series; JGP: Junior Grand Prix

International
Event	11–12	12–13	13–14	14–15	15–16	16–17	17–18	18–19
GP Cup of China					10th			
GP Rostelecom					11th			
CS Finlandia					6th			
CS Golden Spin							8th	
CS Ice Challenge				1st				
CS Lombardia				2nd				
International: Junior
JGP Final		2nd						
JGP Austria		2nd						
JGP Croatia		2nd						
JGP Estonia			12th					
JGP Italy	3rd							
National
U.S. Champ.	3rd J	10th	9th	9th	7th	18th	13th	15th
Levels: N = Novice; J = Junior
