= Giuseppe Di Stefano =

Italian opera singer (1921–2008)

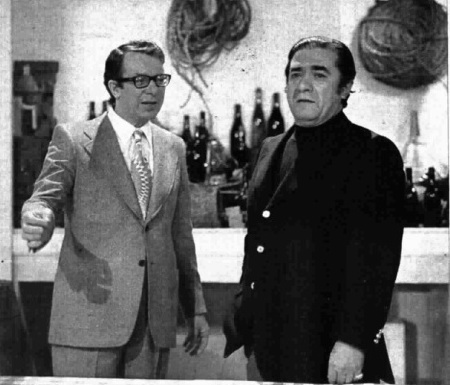
- Luigi Veronelli (left) and Giuseppe Di Stefano (right), 1972
- Born: 24 July 1921; Motta Sant'Anastasia, Sicily, Kingdom of Italy
- Died: 3 March 2008 (aged 86); Santa Maria Hoè, Lombardy, Italy
- Other name: Pippo
- Occupation: Opera singer (full-lyric tenor)
- Years active: 1946–1992
- Spouses: Maria Girolami (m. 1949; div. 1976) Monika Curth (m. 1994)
- Children: 3

Giuseppe Di Stefano (24 July 1921 – 3 March 2008) was an Italian operatic tenor who sang professionally from the mid-1940s until the early 1990s. Called "Pippo" by both fans and friends, he was known as the "Golden Voice" or "The Most Beautiful Voice", as the true successor of Beniamino Gigli. Luciano Pavarotti said he modeled himself after Di Stefano. In an interview Pavarotti said "Di Stefano is my idol. There is a solar voice...It was the most incredible, open voice you could hear. The musicality of Di Stefano is as natural and beautiful as the voice is phenomenal". Di Stefano was also the tenor who most inspired José Carreras. He died on 3 March 2008 as a result of injuries from an attack by unknown assailants.

Di Stefano performing the song 'Firenze Sogna' in 1955

== Early life and musical training ==
Giuseppe Di Stefano was born in Motta Sant'Anastasia, a village near Catania, Sicily, in 1921. He moved to Milan with his parents when he was six. He was the only son of a carabiniere turned cobbler and his dressmaker wife. Di Stefano was educated at a Jesuit seminary and briefly contemplated entering the priesthood.

When he was 16, he burst into song after losing a game of cards, and the friend with whom he was playing said he must get his voice trained. Two years later he began studying in earnest with the baritones Luigi Montesanto and Mariano Stabile, the latter impressing on the young tenor the importance of clear diction, advice he readily followed.

World War Two interrupted Di Stefano's early career as he had to join the Italian army, where he often entertained the troops with his singing. He was considered such a bad soldier that his commanding officer decided that he would better serve his country by leaving the forces in order to sing. He performed under the pseudonym Nino Florio until Italy was defeated, when he fled to Switzerland. After a period of internment he was allowed to sing on Lausanne Radio, where he made the first of his recordings, disclosing a tenor voice of decided beauty and a singer with personality. He recorded many of his native Sicilian songs, records of which first brought him to the attention of discerning ears outside Italy in the late 1940s.

== Career ==
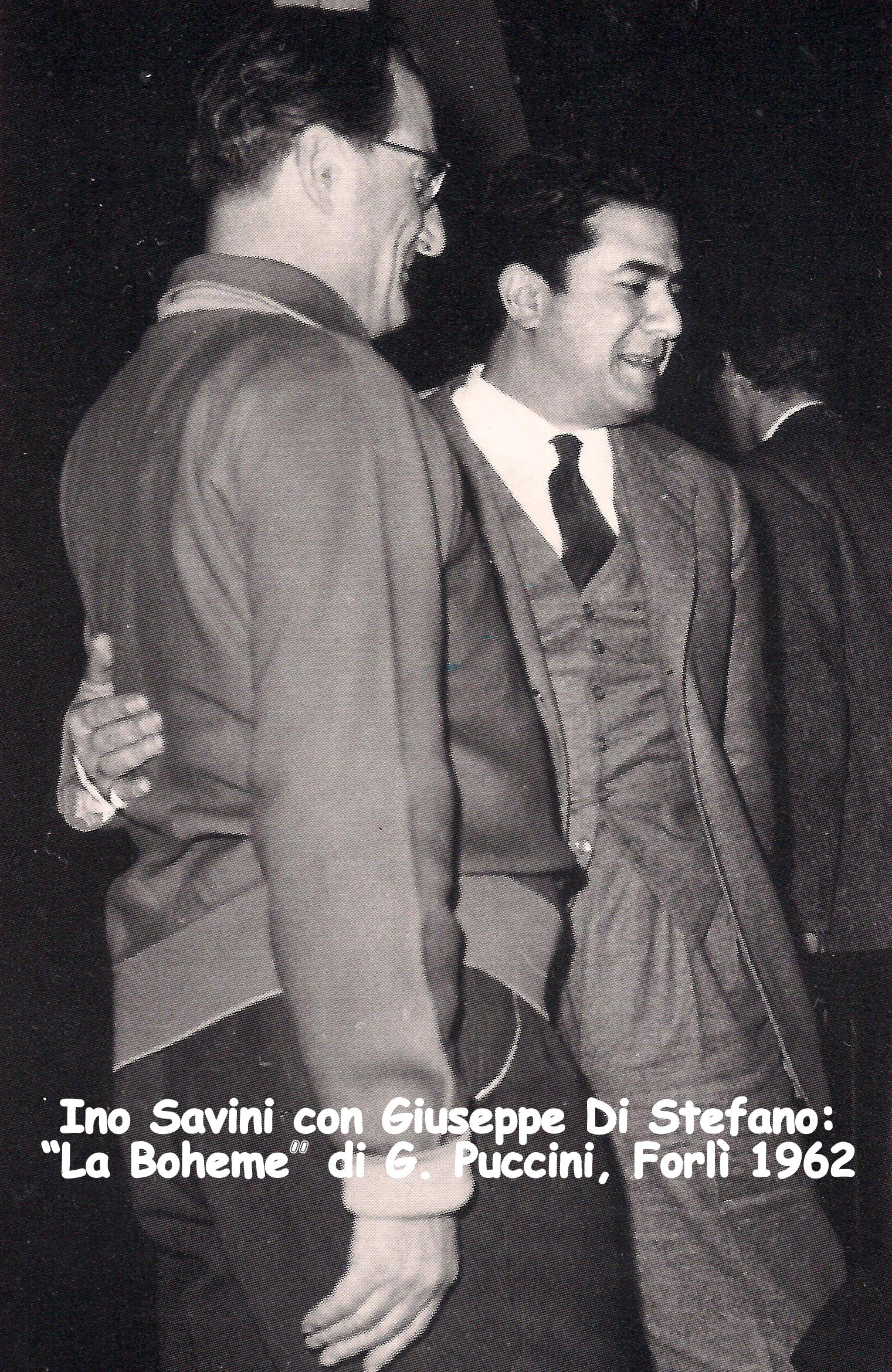
Giuseppe Di Stefano and Ino Savini - 'La Bohème' (1962)

He began his career as a lyric tenor, notable in roles such as Nemorino in Donizetti's L'Elisir d'Amore and Alfredo in Verdi's La Traviata. He made his New York debut at the Metropolitan Opera in February 1948 as the Duke of Mantua in Verdi's Rigoletto after singing the role in Riccione with Hjördis Schymberg in August of the previous year. After his performance in Manon a month later, Musical America wrote that Di Stefano "had the rich velvety sound we have seldom heard since the days of Gigli". He went on to perform regularly in New York for many years. In 1957, Di Stefano made his British debut at the Edinburgh Festival as Nemorino in L'elisir d'amore and his Royal Opera House, Covent Garden, debut in 1961, as Cavaradossi in Tosca.

As a singer, Di Stefano was admired for his excellent diction, unique timbre, passionate delivery and, in particular, for the sweetness of his soft singing. In his Metropolitan Opera radio broadcast debut in Faust, he attacked the high C forte and then softened to a pianissimo. Sir Rudolf Bing said in his memoirs, "The most spectacular single moment in my observation year had come when I heard his diminuendo on the high C in "Salut! demeure" in Faust: I shall never as long as I live forget the beauty of that sound".

During his years of international celebrity, Di Stefano won a gold Orfeo, an Italian musical award.

In 1953 Walter Legge, leader of EMI's classical wing, wanted a tenor to record all the popular Italian operas with Maria Callas, and chose Di Stefano. Among their recording achievements was the famous 1953 studio recording of Tosca under Victor de Sabata, which is considered "as being one of the great performances in the history of the gramophone". The two also performed together on stage frequently, from 1951 in South America to the end of 1957 in Un ballo in maschera at La Scala, the last time the two collaborated in an opera. He sang Alfredo in the famous Visconti production of La traviata in 1955 at La Scala, as well as Edgardo to her Lucia under Herbert von Karajan at La Scala, Berlin and Vienna. Rudolf Bing of the Metropolitan Opera House lamented Di Stefano's playboy lifestyle, which he felt was the cause of his vocal decline, although Di Stefano himself blamed allergies to synthetic fibres for permanently damaging his vocal cords.

In 1973, Di Stefano and Maria Callas went together for a recital tour that ended in 1974: critics remarked that Maria Callas had lost her voice, but the public reaction was nevertheless enthusiastic everywhere. It was during this period that there were rumors of a brief romantic relationship between the two singers. Di Stefano continued to sing successfully and his final operatic role was as the Emperor in Turandot, in July 1992.

=== Private life and death ===
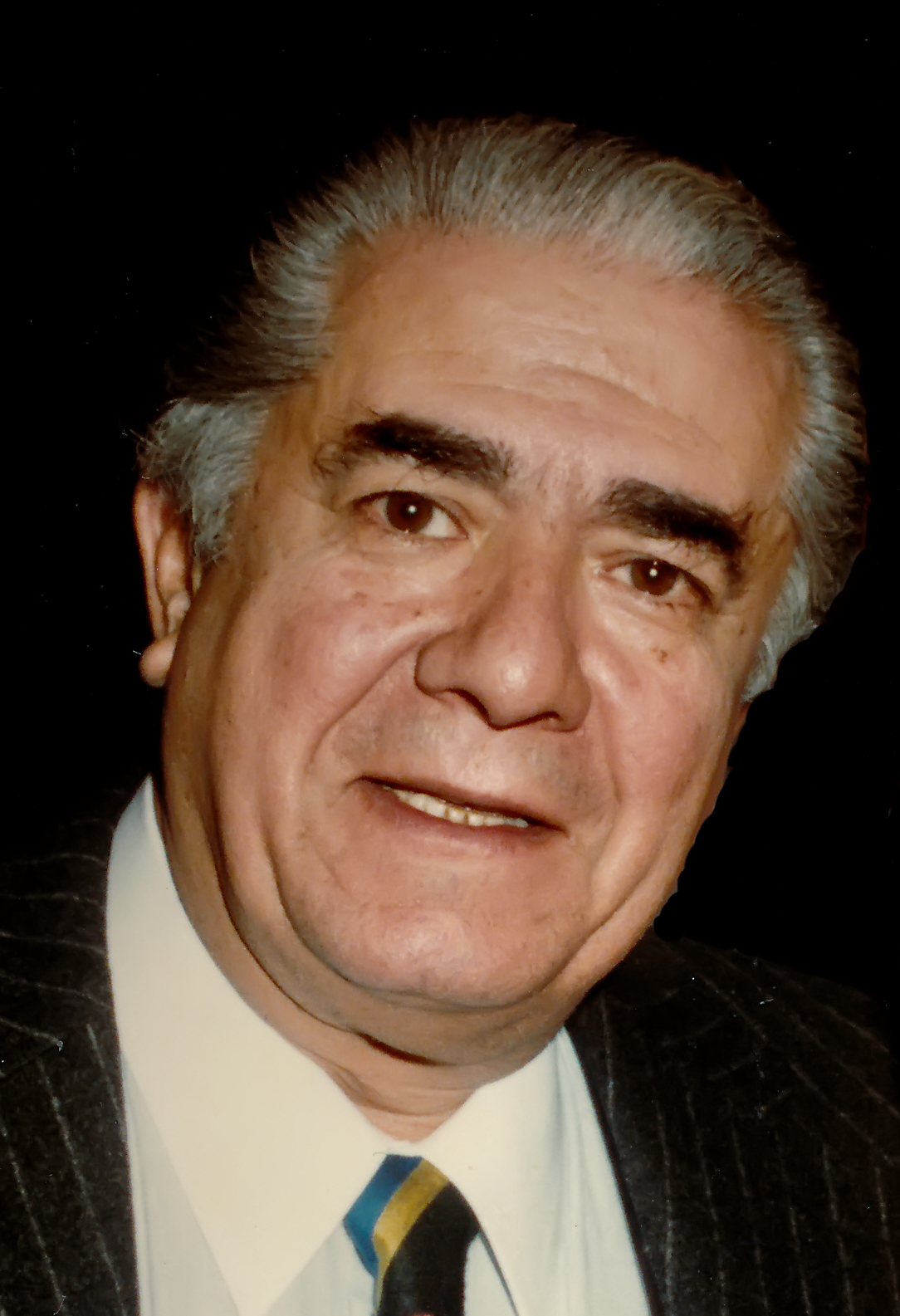
Giuseppe Di Stefano later in life - 1983

In 1949 he married the conservatory student Maria Girolami in New York, with whom he had three children. The pair separated in 1976. In 1977 he began a new romantic relationship with Monika Curth, an operetta soprano originally from Hamburg, whom he married in 1993.

His last public appearance was on 24 October 2004 in Oderzo to receive an award.

On 3 December 2004, he was seriously injured during a robbery at his home in Diani Beach in Kenya by unknown assailants who left him on the ground bloodied and unconscious. After being admitted to a hospital in Mombasa, his condition proved to be more serious than it had appeared at first. After undergoing at least three operations, he went into a coma on 7 December. On 23 December, he was transferred to Italy, where he was hospitalised in Milan. Eventually he awoke from the coma, but his health never fully improved. He died in his home in Santa Maria Hoè, north of Milan, on 3 March 2008 at the age of 86.

== Vocal and singing style ==
Giuseppe Di Stefano in stage clothes (photo with dedication from 1947)

Di Stefano was a lyric tenor with a soft voice and a warm and rich timbre. He was admired for his vocal skills, clear diction, passionate phrasing, captivating interpretation and the lightness of pianissimo and shades. Far from the precision and "aplomb" of a Bjorling or a Kraus, or the vocal overpowering of a Del Monaco or rigour of a Bergonzi, Di Stefano had a natural musicality, with an instinctive and communicative style of singing.

Di Stefano can be placed in the tradition of tenori lirici post-romantic of the Italian and French repertoire, where he gave memorable performances especially in the first part of his career (Rigoletto, La traviata, La bohème, The pearl fishermen, Manon, Faust). In the following years he developed into roles of the lyrical repertoire, with more drive and drama (Tosca, La forza del destino, Turandot, Carmen, up to Pagliacci and Andrea Chénier).

== Recordings with Maria Callas ==
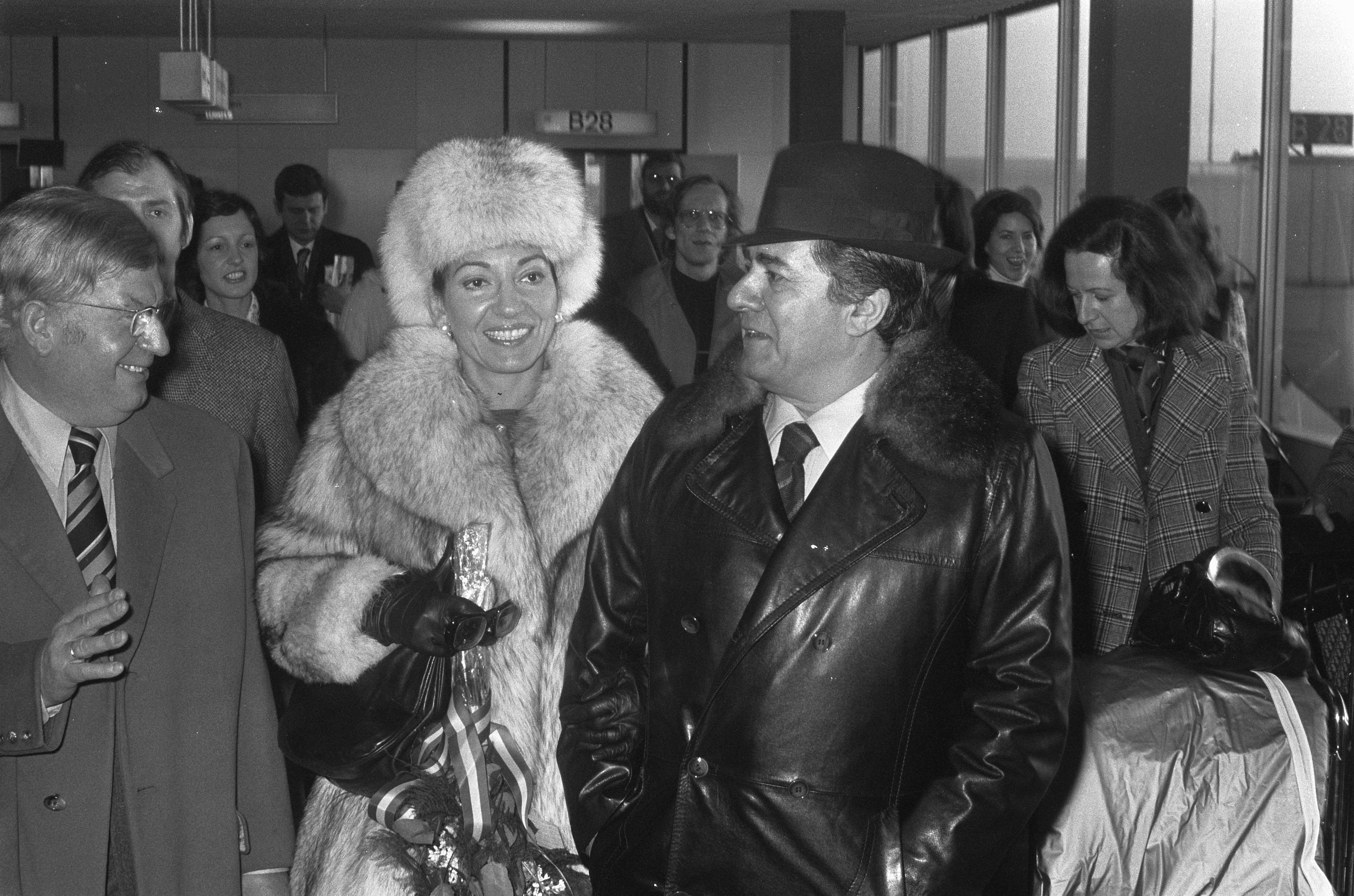
Giuseppe Di Stefano with Maria Callas on her farewell tour on 9 December 1973.

External videos
- Maria Callas 'London Farewell Concert' at the Royal Festival Hall with Giuseppe di Stefano, 1973, YouTube

Di Stefano and Maria Callas recorded many operas together, all of which for EMI. Together they recorded the following complete operas:

- Lucia di Lammermoor – 1953
- I puritani – 1953
- Cavalleria rusticana – 1953
- Tosca – 1953
- Pagliacci – 1954
- Rigoletto – 1955
- La traviata – 1955 (Live)
- Il trovatore – 1956
- La bohème – 1956
- Un ballo in maschera – 1956
- Manon Lescaut – 1957

A series of duets with Di Stefano and Callas was recorded by the Philips label in the period November–December 1972, with Antonio de Almeida conducting the London Symphony Orchestra. These recordings were not published officially, but a 'pirate' version did appear.

== Other recordings ==
Di Stefano also made many other recordings with other wonderful singers, complete EMI sets of Madama Butterfly (opposite Victoria de los Ángeles, 1954) and La traviata (with Antonietta Stella and Tito Gobbi, 1955).

For English Decca he recorded L'elisir d'amore with Hilde Gueden and Fernando Corena (1955), La Gioconda (with Zinka Milanov and Leonard Warren, 1957), La forza del destino (1958) and Tosca (with Leontyne Price and Giuseppe Taddei, Herbert von Karajan conducting, 1962).

For Ricordi (Ricordi MRO 104/105), he made a complete stereo Lucia di Lammermoor with Renata Scotto, Ettore Bastianini and Ivo Vinco in 1958, with Nino Sanzogno conducting the Orchestra and Chorus of La Scala, Milan.

In 1995, VAI issued an approved version of La bohème, from a 1959 performance in New Orleans, with the tenor starring opposite Licia Albanese, Audrey Schuh, Giuseppe Valdengo and Norman Treigle. Additionally, in 1962 the tenor recorded excerpts from Massenet's Manon, with Anna Moffo, conducted by René Leibowitz.

In 1951, Di Stefano sang in a performance of Verdi's Requiem, at Carnegie Hall, conducted by Arturo Toscanini, the other soloists being Herva Nelli, Fedora Barbieri and Cesare Siepi. It was released as a recording by RCA.

== Single songs ==
- Che gelida manina, Pourquoi me revéiller, Una furtiva lagrima, E lucevan le stelle, Del tempio al limitar (con Giuseppe Marchiò) RADIO LOSANNA-EMI 1945
- È la solita storia del pastore, Oh dolce incanto, Ed anche Beppe amò, Mi par d'udire ancora RADIO LOSANNA-EMI 1946
- Ah dispar vision, E lucevan le stelle, De' miei bollenti spiriti, È la solita storia del pastore, Addio Mignon, Ah non-credevi tu His Master's Voice 1947
- Com'è gentil, Pourquoi me revellier EMI 1951
- Firenze è come un albero fiorito, Non piangere Liù, Nessun dorma, Ch'ella mi creda, Or son sei mesi, Oh tu che in seno agli angeli EMI 1955
- Ah mi parla di lei, Tardi si fa, Notte d'amor, Già nella notte densa, Oh come al tuo sottile, Leila, Leila mia, Non hai compreso (con Rosanna Carteri) EMI 1957
- Un dì all'azzurro spazio, Come un bel dì di maggio, Recondita armonia, E lucevan le stelle, Non piangere Liù, Nessun dorma, Pourqoui me revellier, En fermant les yeux, La fleur, Salut demeure, De mon amie, fleur endormie Decca 1958
