= Feargus Hetherington =

Scottish violinist

Feargus Hetherington (born 1979 in Scotland) is a violinist and violist based in Glasgow. He has performed from an early age throughout Scotland and abroad. He arranges music, teaches and presents music workshops and seminars.

== Studies, teaching and coaching ==
Hetherington studied at the Royal Conservatoire of Scotland and the Cleveland Institute of Music, Ohio, supported by a Cleveland Institute of Music Scholarship and a Caird Trust Travel Scholarship. He attended summer short courses abroad including the Starling-DeLay Symposium on Violin Studies at the Juilliard School and the Aria International Summer School. In 2001/2002 he was leader of the National Youth Orchestra of Scotland as they toured in Scotland, The Netherlands and Germany. From 2012 - 2014 he has participated in Total Immersion Seminars with Joseph Swensen, in Vermont, USA, supported by the Musicians Benevolent Fund and Creative Scotland (twice).

Hetherington teaches violin, viola and chamber music at the University of St Andrews, Scotland.

== Performance: solo and duo ==
Hetherington has given unaccompanied recitals featuring works by major classical composers and by contemporary Scottish composers, some of which he has premiered. He has performed many of the major concertos with Scottish orchestras including Violin Concerto (Tchaikovsky), Violin Concerto (Elgar), Bruch's Scottish Fantasy, the Violin Concerto No. 1 (Bruch) with, and Autumn from Vivaldi's The Four Seasons. Hetherington had first performed this with the Scottish Bach Consort in 1996.

Hetherington has collaborated with a number of pianists. During a short tour in October 2014 he was interviewed and performed on Classics Unwrapped on BBC Radio Scotland. A much earlier review of the same duo noted that Hetherington could spin "a most beautiful tone ... floating a soft high note as pure and delicate as a thread of goassamer". A review of the Brahms Viola Sonatas at Edinburgh Festival Fringe in 2014 noted 'virtuosic technique and shrewd musical artistry". His tour of eight concerts throughout the UK in 2013 with Olga Gorelik ended with a "breathless audience" at an Edinburgh Festival Fringe concert, for a programme on 'Elgar and his Contemporaries'. A review of their Scottish tour the previous year indicated that "this is a partnership which will go far ..." A series of concerts with Edward Cohen following the programme format used during 'The Golden Age of Violin' (1920 - 1940) culminated with a West End Festival concert in Glasgow and two concerts at the 2015 Edinburgh Festival Fringe. For more than a decade Hetherington has performed in the concert series 'Music for a Summer Afternoon' in the Cathedral of the Isles, Isle of Cumbrae. Since 2013 he has toured regularly with Opera Bohemia's chamber version of Madame Butterfly (solo violin with piano) for small communities. Concerts abroad include New York, Poland, Germany, Sweden and a tour in Ireland. Hetherington has been involved with singers, in innovative art projects, new violin projects and exhibitions

== Chamber music and orchestra ==
Since 2015 Hetherington has performed with the newly formed Kentigern Quartet, based in Glasgow and since 2010 has led The Auriga Strings in Wiltshire. He is a former member of a number of chamber groups including Symposia, The Frevo Quartet and the Roxburgh Quartet. As a freelance musician Hetherington performs regularly with the BBC Scottish Symphony Orchestra. He has performed with many ensembles and orchestras including the Scottish Chamber Orchestra with whom he toured in Germany in 2008. Ensemble leadership included the Heisenberg Ensemble (guest leader since 2010), a thirteen-piece professional ensemble for Benjamin Britten's Opera Albert Herring., Opera Bohemia's Eugene Onegin(Tchaikovsky) and was violinist in the ensemble for Hirda, a Shetland Opera. He has led orchestras and ensembles, including the City of Glasgow Symphony Orchestra, for many major choral works including the Messiah (Handel), The Seasons (Haydn), Elgar's The Apostles, Elgar's The Dream of Gerontius, The Creation (Haydn) and A German Requiem (Brahms).

== Instruments ==
Hetherington performs on contemporary instruments. He was interviewed by the Strad magazine (July 2014) about his instruments, two of which were made by Neil Kristóf Értz, one in 2001 (now adapted for Baroque repertoire) and the latest in 2007, after Stradivari c. 1715.

== Workshops ==
Hetherington conducted workshops throughout the UK for Live Music Now, and in 2009 gave workshops in Abu Dhabi as part of Abu Dhabi Music and Arts Festival organised by the Abu Dhabi Music & Arts Foundation. As a member of Symposia, he toured in the UK, US and South Africa, promoting specially composed and recorded music, The Farmer's Cheese, for young people with cochlear implants. In 2013/2014 he was invited by the Scottish Ensemble to assist in their Music for Change programme in prisons. He has held seminars and concerts in various educational institutions including Napier University and The University of Edinburgh.

== Discography ==
- A Highland Ballad, with pianist Mira Opalińska, released in 2012 by Natural Studio Records
- The Auriga Strings, Brahms String Sextet No. 1 in B Flat, Op. 18 and Strauss Capriccio, Op. 85, 2011, Mooncalf Studio, Wiltshire.
- Frevo Quartet, Standing Stones, Natural Studio Records
- Frevo Quartet, Histoire du Tango, Natural Studio Records
- Maelasta, Natural Studio Records
- Ness by Gareth Williams recorded on CD "Contemporary Music from Ireland" for the Contemporary Music Centre of Ireland

== Contributor ==
- Violinist on Classical Accordionist, Paul Chamberlain's CD, Accordion Sensations
- Violinist on Meall a' Bhuiridh, SPAD CD
- Violinist on Sound Track for Drift (music by Eddie McGuire) recorded Summer 2015 by Vision Mechanics
- Violinist in 2007 recording of the Rosslyn Motet recorded in Rosslyn Chapel
