= Olga Gorelik =

Belarusian-born American pianist

Olga Gorelik is a Belarusian-born American pianist who obtained both bachelor's and master's degrees as well as Artist Diploma in music from Cleveland Institute of Music where she studied under guidance from such teachers as Paul Schenly, Margarita Shevchenko, and Sergei Babayan. In May 2005 she received an invitation to perform at the Las Galas Concert Series in Mexico and two years later got a silver medal at the Fischoff National Chamber Music Competition and joined Klimt. She also was a recipient of the Coleman Chamber Ensemble Competition's Barstow Prize which granted her to perform Rachmaninoff’s Piano Concerto No. 3 at the Cleveland Institute of Music Concerto Competition the following year finishing her award grabbing years with Sadie Zellen's Piano Prize. She has performed at the John F. Kennedy Center for the Performing Arts as well as Chicago and Naples. Golerik's tour of eight concerts throughout the UK in 2013 with violinist Feargus Hetherington culminated with a full house and a "breathless audience" at an Edinburgh Festival Fringe concert, for a programme on 'Elgar and his Contemporaries'. In 2012 their Scottish tour was also a success. Gorelik and Hetherington's Inverness concert was highly praised with comments such as "both musicians contributed to a powerful reading of these evocative and intense pieces ... this is a partnership which will go far ..."
