= Old Museum Building, Brisbane =

Building in Brisbane, Australia

Coordinates: 27.4519°S 153.0294°E

Old Museum Building
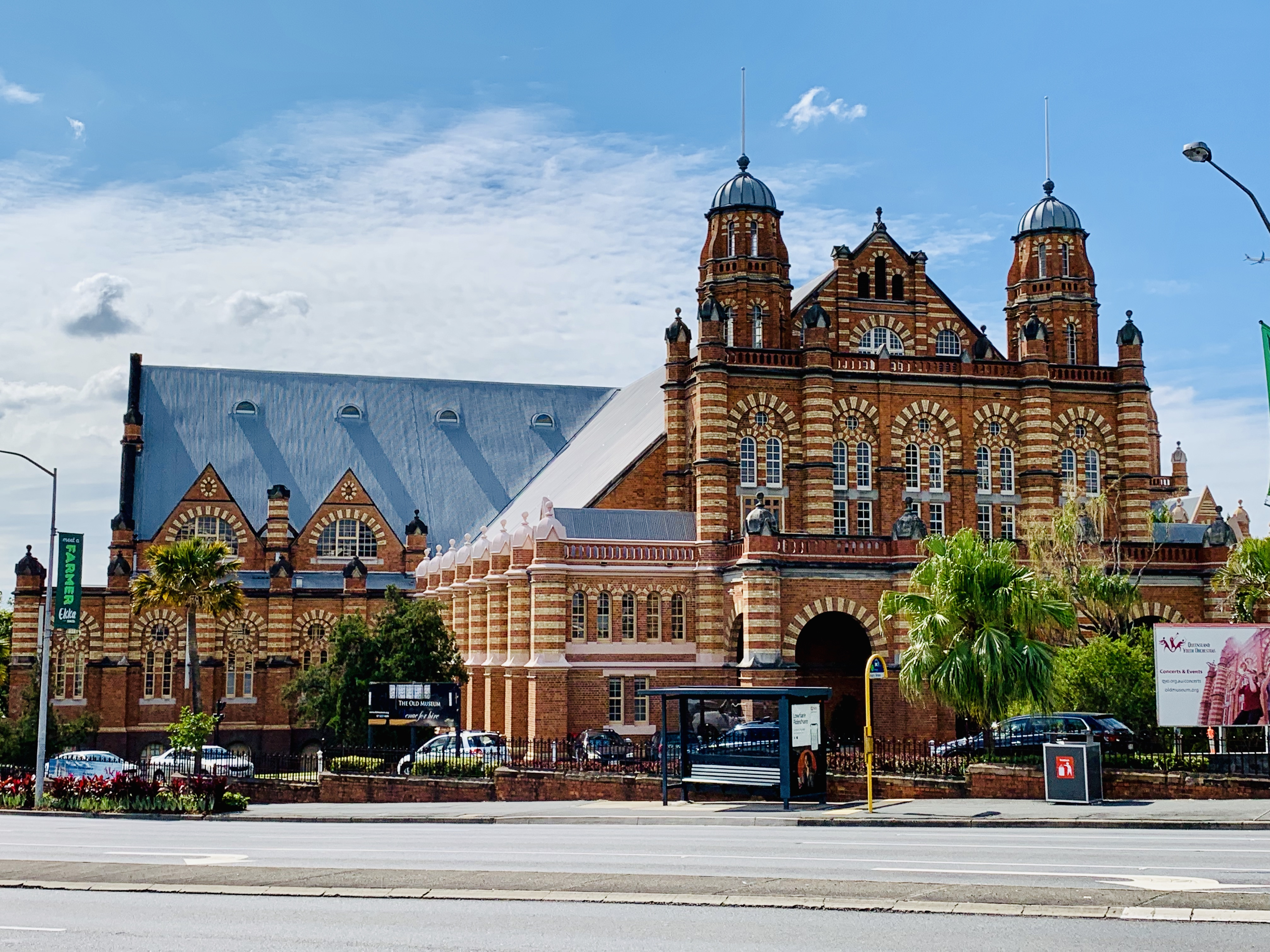
- The Old Museum Building, 2019
- Former names: Exhibition Building and Concert Hall

General information
- Architectural style: Federation Romanesque
- Location: Cnr Gregory Terrace and Bowen Bridge Road, Bowen Hills, Brisbane, Queensland
- Completed: 1891; 135 years ago
- Owner: Queensland Government

Design and construction
- Architect: George Henry Male Addison

The Old Museum Building is a heritage-listed former exhibition building, former museum and now performance venue in Bowen Hills, Brisbane, Queensland, Australia. It is made from 1.3 million red bricks and bordered by Gregory Terrace and the Exhibition Grounds. The Old Museum Building is one of only two remaining exhibition buildings built in Australia during the 19th century, the other being the Royal Exhibition Building. The Old Museum Building is a cultural landmark of Brisbane, and is noted for its history in the performing arts with recitals by Dame Nellie Melba and Ignacy Jan Paderewski.

== History ==
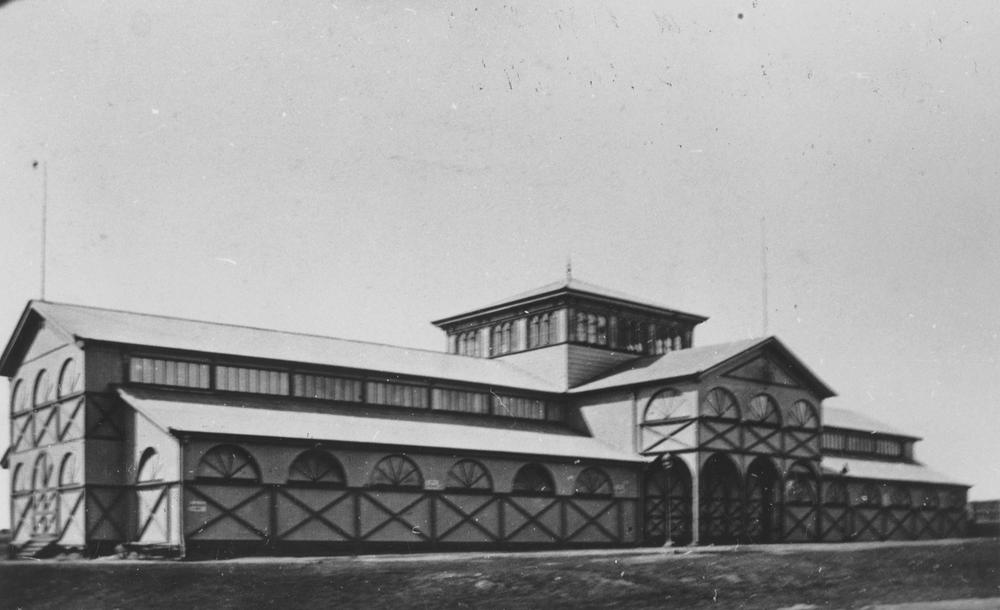
The original exhibition building, Bowen Hills ca. 1877

The Old Museum was originally called the Exhibition Building and Concert Hall. It was built in 1891 for the Queensland National Agricultural and Industrial Association after Brisbane's first exhibition building, which had occupied the land, was destroyed by fire on 13 June 1888. At the time of the fire the building was being used as a skating rink.

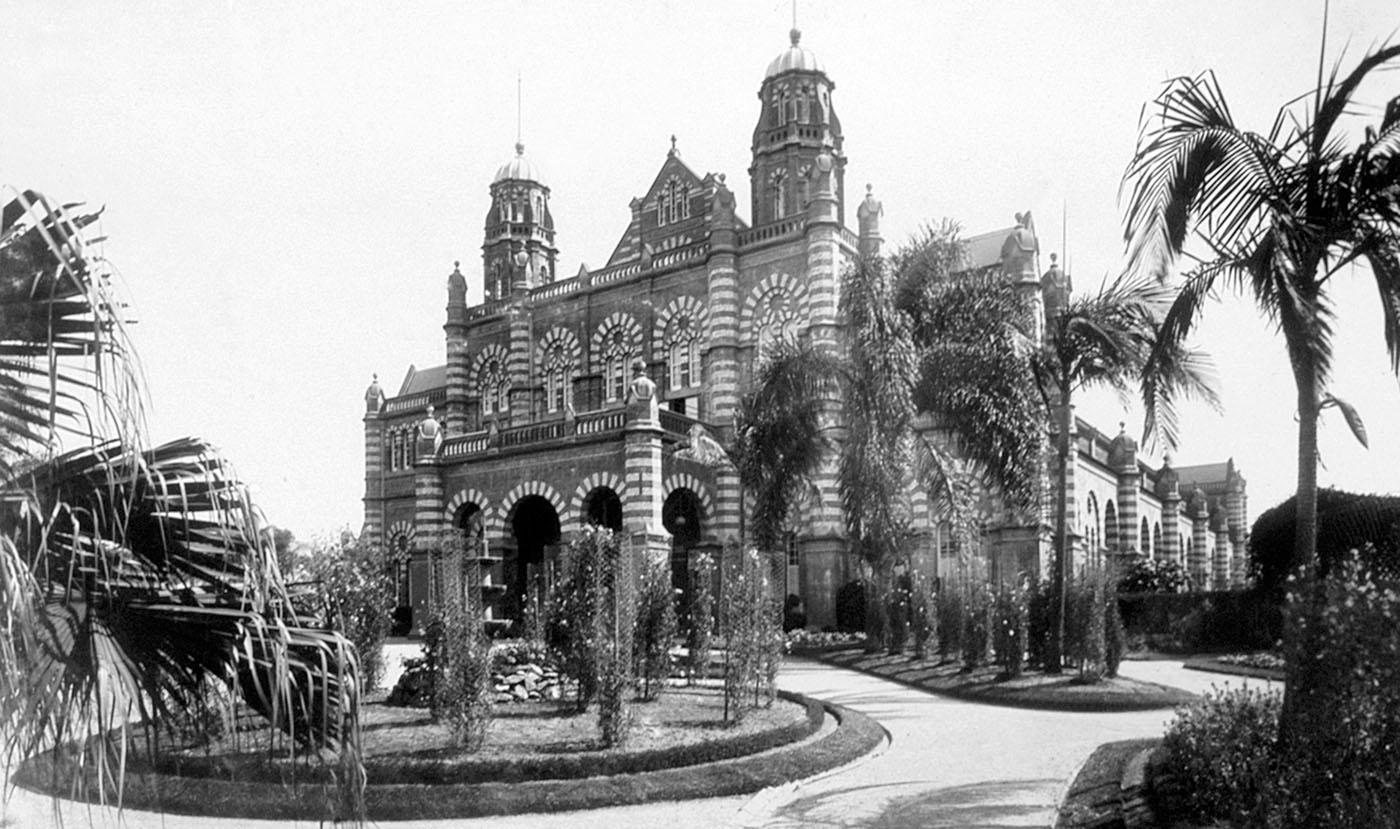
The formal gardens at the Gregory Terrace portico, ca. 1926

On 25 April 1891, the laying of the foundation stone ceremony was held. Sir Arthur Hunter Palmer, acting Governor of Queensland, was given the honour of laying the foundation stone. Buried beneath the foundation stone is a bottle containing each of Brisbane's leading journals. The construction of the Old Museum was completed in August 1891

The land had been used by the Queensland Acclimatisation Society from 1863 to 1875.

The new exhibition building was designed by the architect George Henry Male Addison (1857–1922). The style of the building may best be described as progressive eclecticism or Indo-Saracenic. The edifice was built over a period of 12 months by over 300 workers. It is entered in the Queensland Heritage Register.

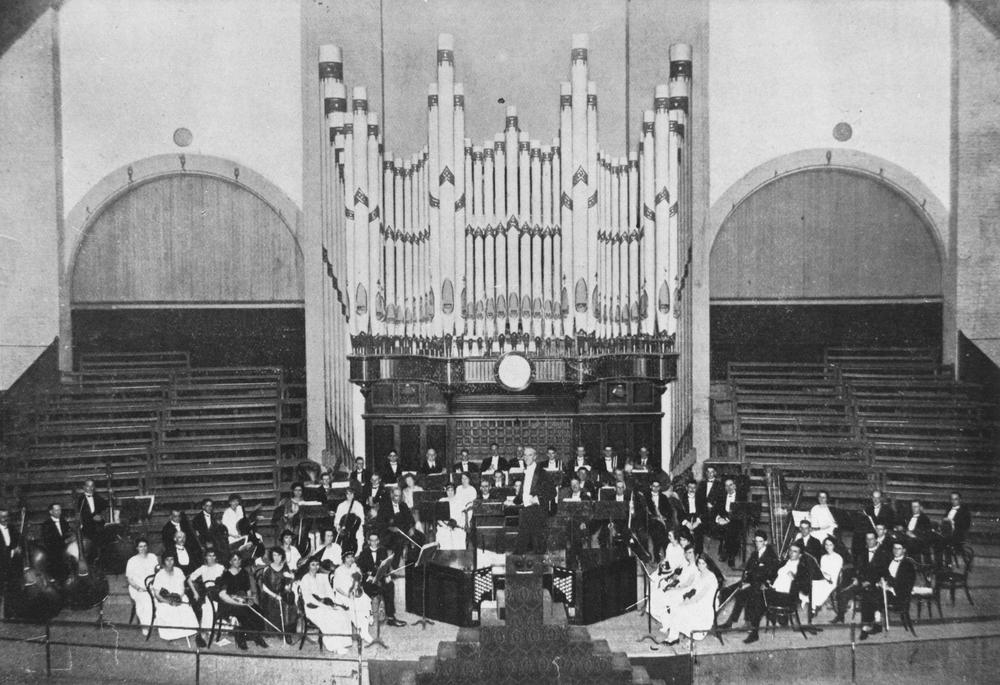
Sampson Orchestral Society at the Exhibition Concert Hall, ca. 1923

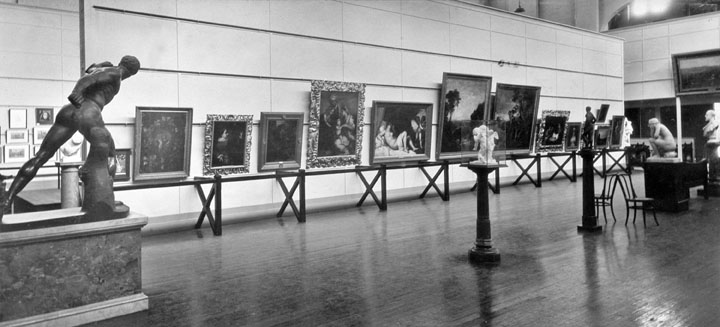
Interior of the Queensland Art Gallery, ca. 1931

The Queensland Government took over control of the building and grounds when the National Association was forced into liquidation by the economic depression in 1897.

In 1899, the Exhibition Hall became home to the Queensland Museum, with the museum remaining in the building until the museum's relocation to the Queensland Cultural Centre in 1986. During the Queensland Museum's 86 years in the building, other parts of the building were used as a Concert Hall and an Art Gallery. Because of the Queensland Museum's long occupancy of the building, the building is now known as the Old Museum.

In 2016, the building was taken back for Ekka and has since been used for the flower and garden displays.

== Performance venue ==
The Old Museum building is home to the Queensland Youth Orchestras, who use the building as a rehearsal, performance and office space. The building is also home for the Brisbane Symphony Orchestra, Brisbane Philharmonic Orchestra, Queensland Youth Choir, Queensland Wind and Brass, Brisbane River City Clippers Barbershop Chorus, Queensland Rhythmic Gymnastics Organisation, Queensland Police Pipes and Drums and the Zen Zen Zo Physical Theatre Company.

The play Troilus and Cressida by William Shakespeare, was also presented in the Old Museum building in 1989. Members of the cast included Geoffrey Rush, Jane Menelaus and Russell Dykstra.

The Old Museum building was also used as one of the sites for the 1980s Australian series of Mission: Impossible.

== Photographs of the Old Museum ==
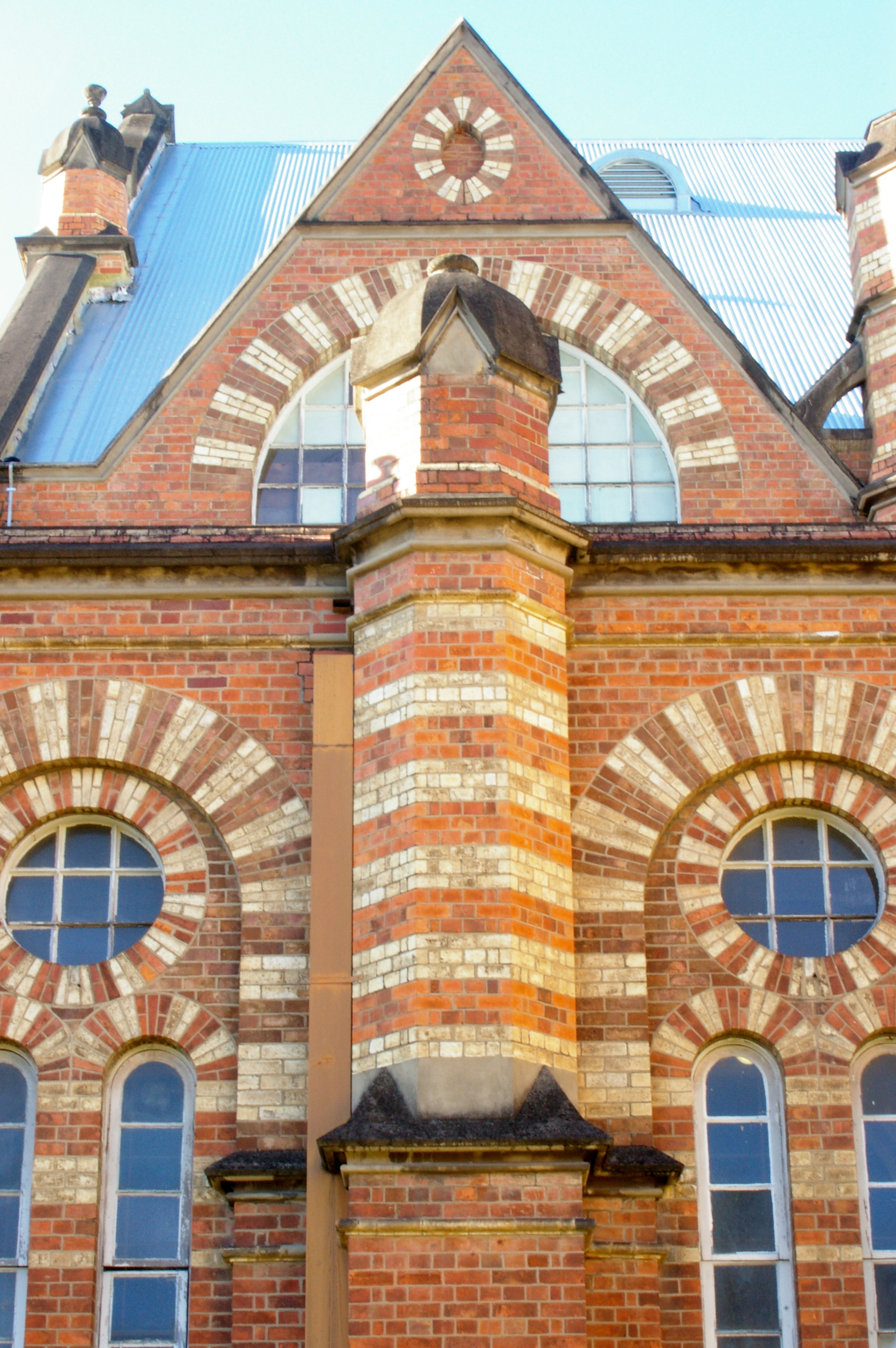
The exterior of the Old Museum Building in Brisbane.

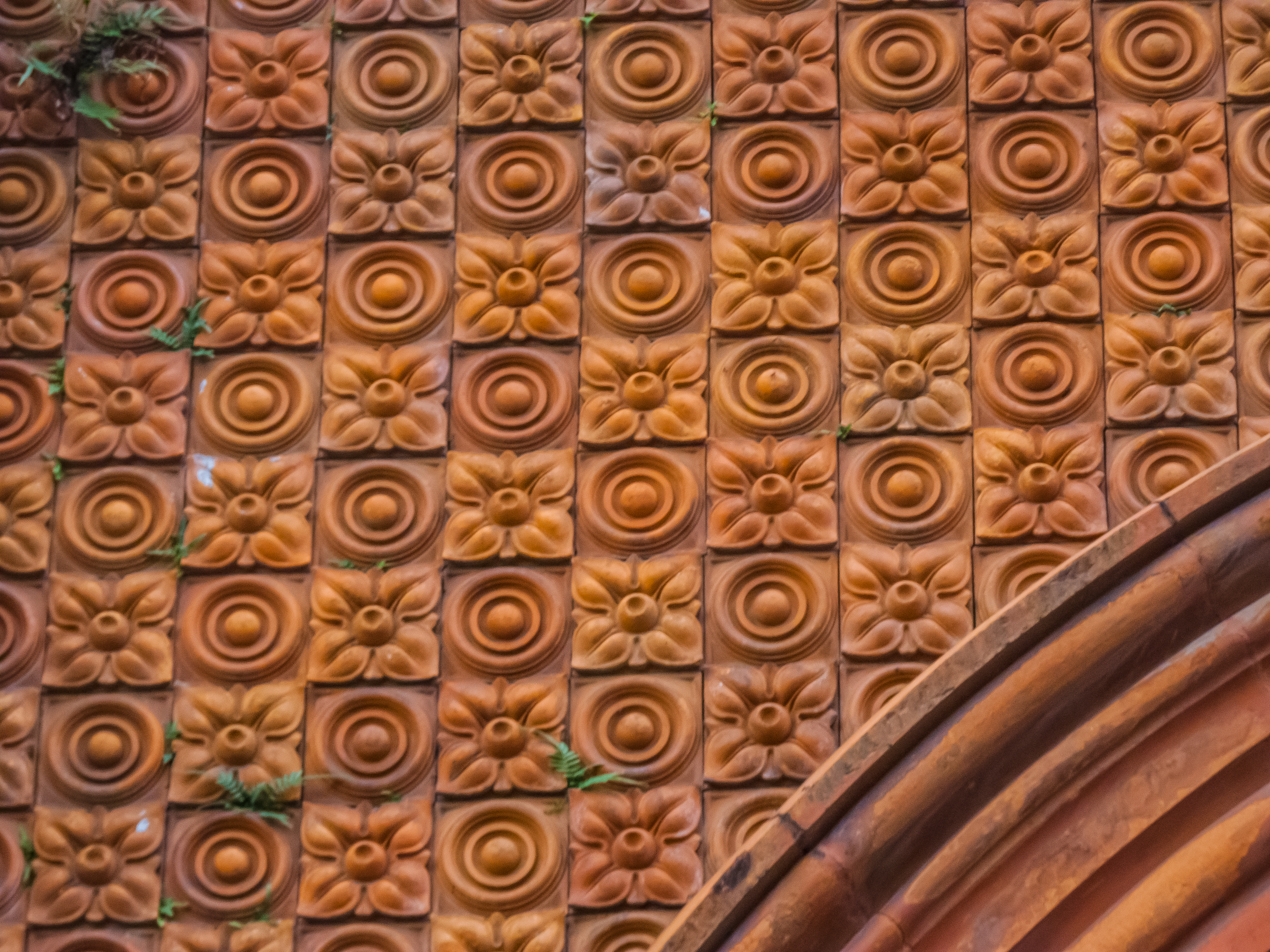
Terracotta tile work above the portico arches.

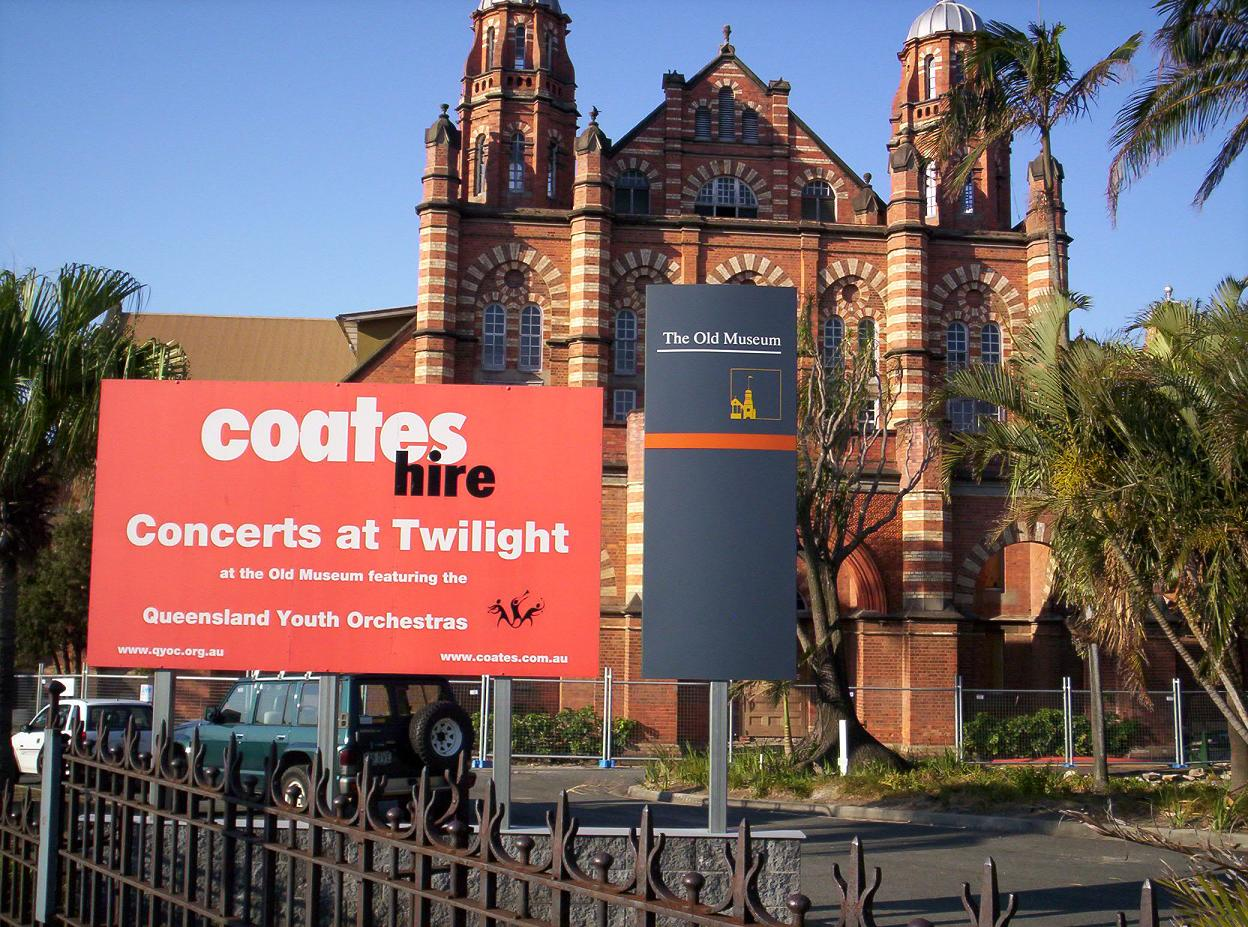
The Old Museum
as the home of the Queensland Youth Orchestras.

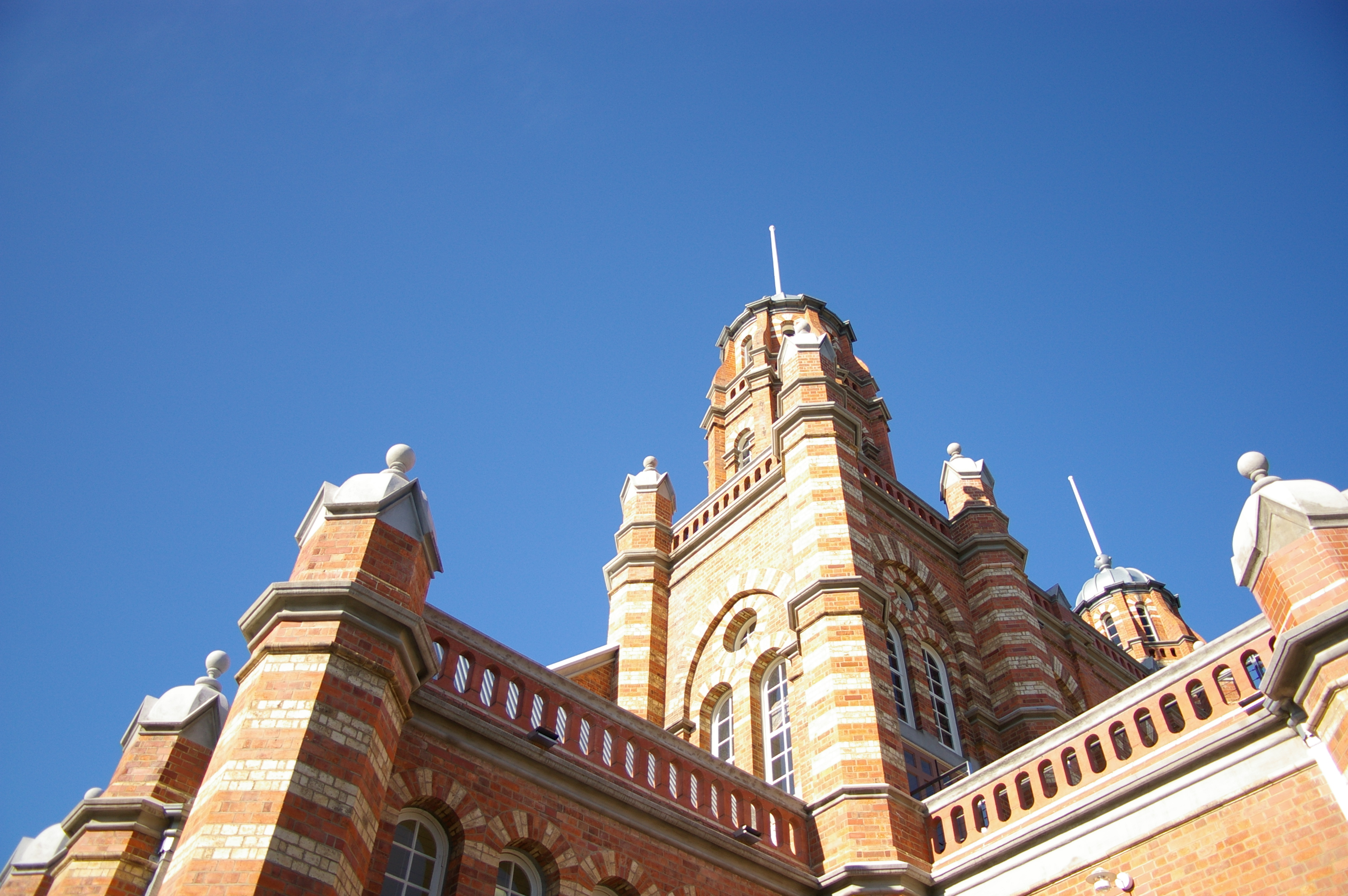
The roof of the Old Museum.

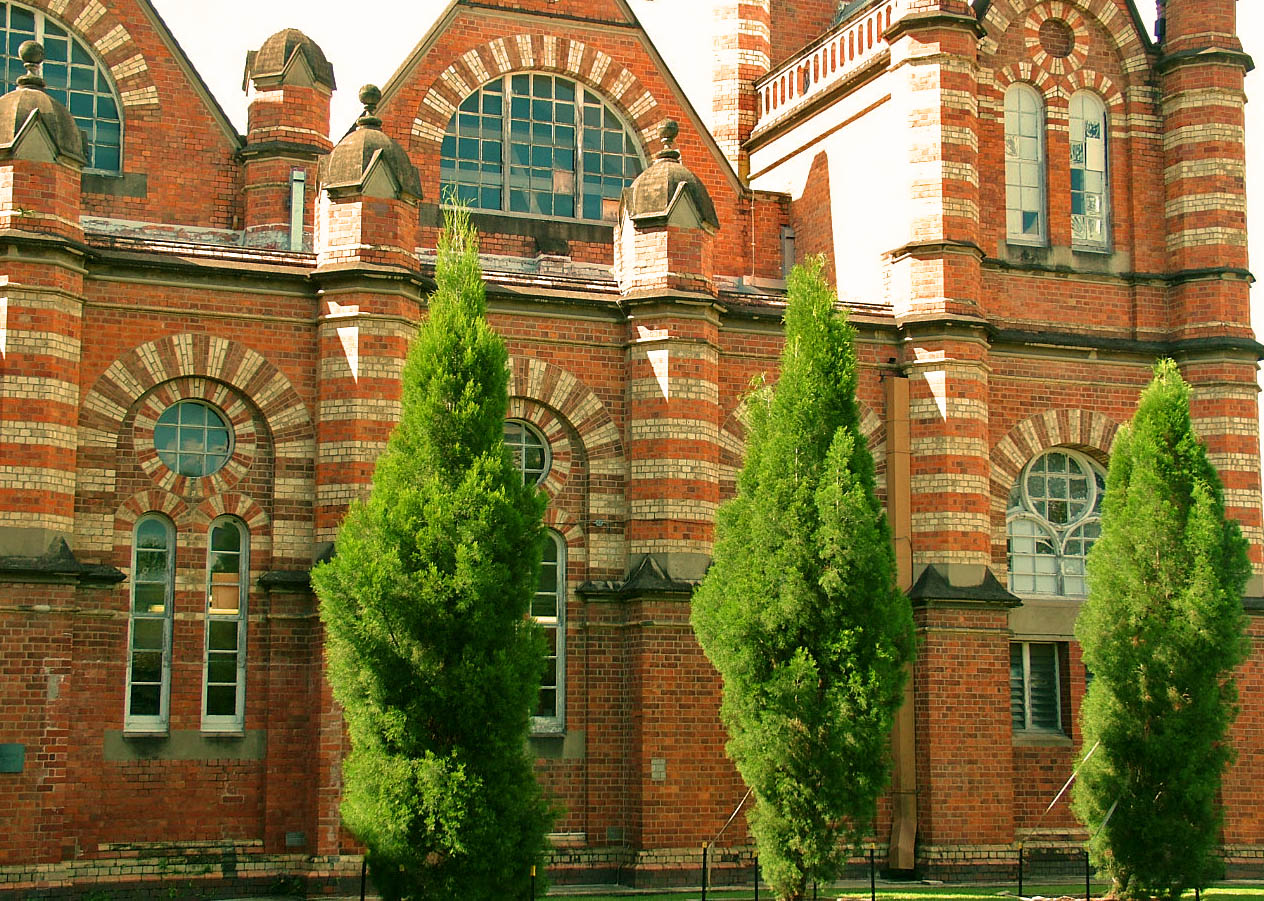
Side view of the Old Museum building.

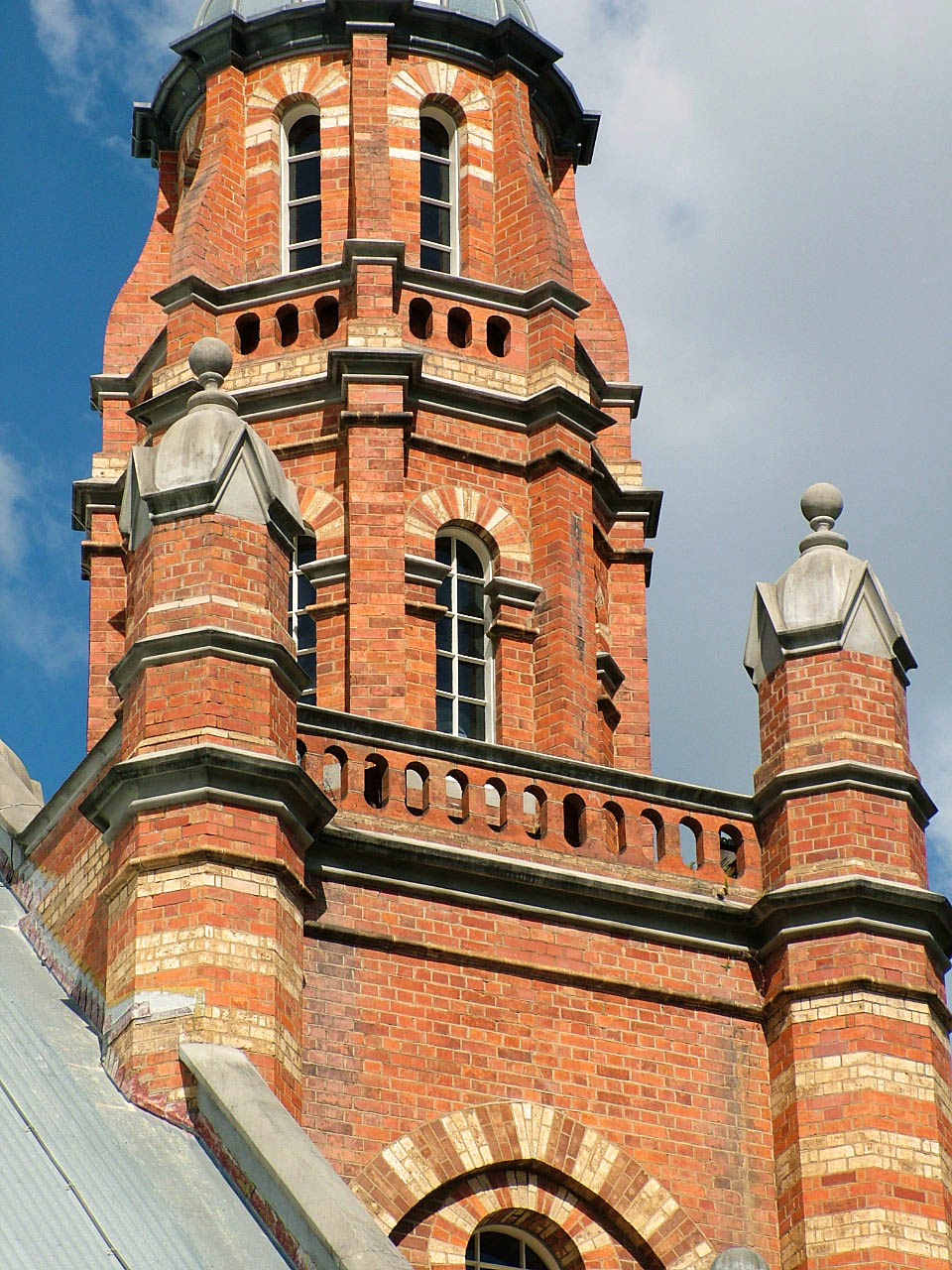
Detail of tower on Western side of Old Museum building.

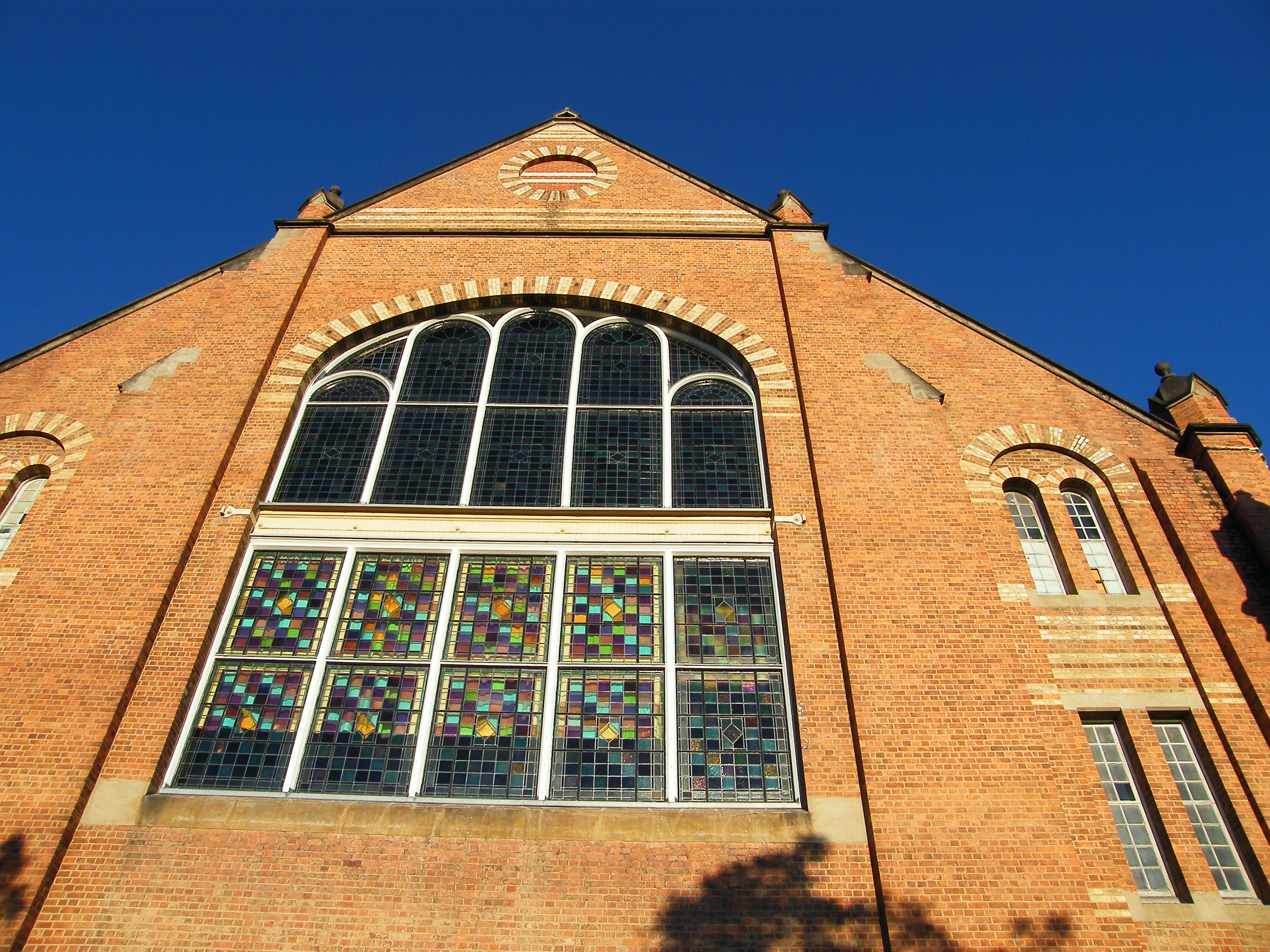
Side view of the Old Museum Building.

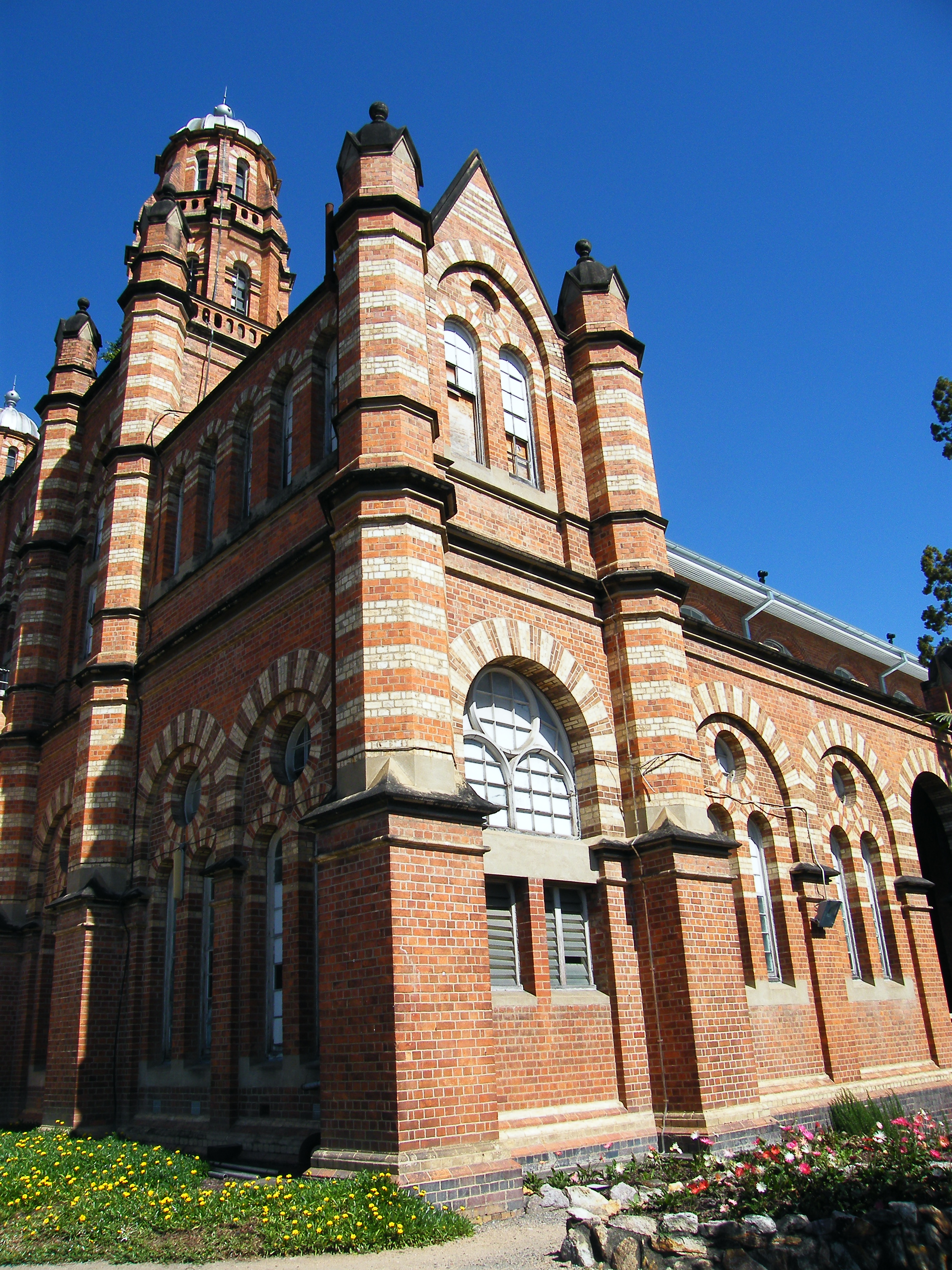
Corner view of the tower.

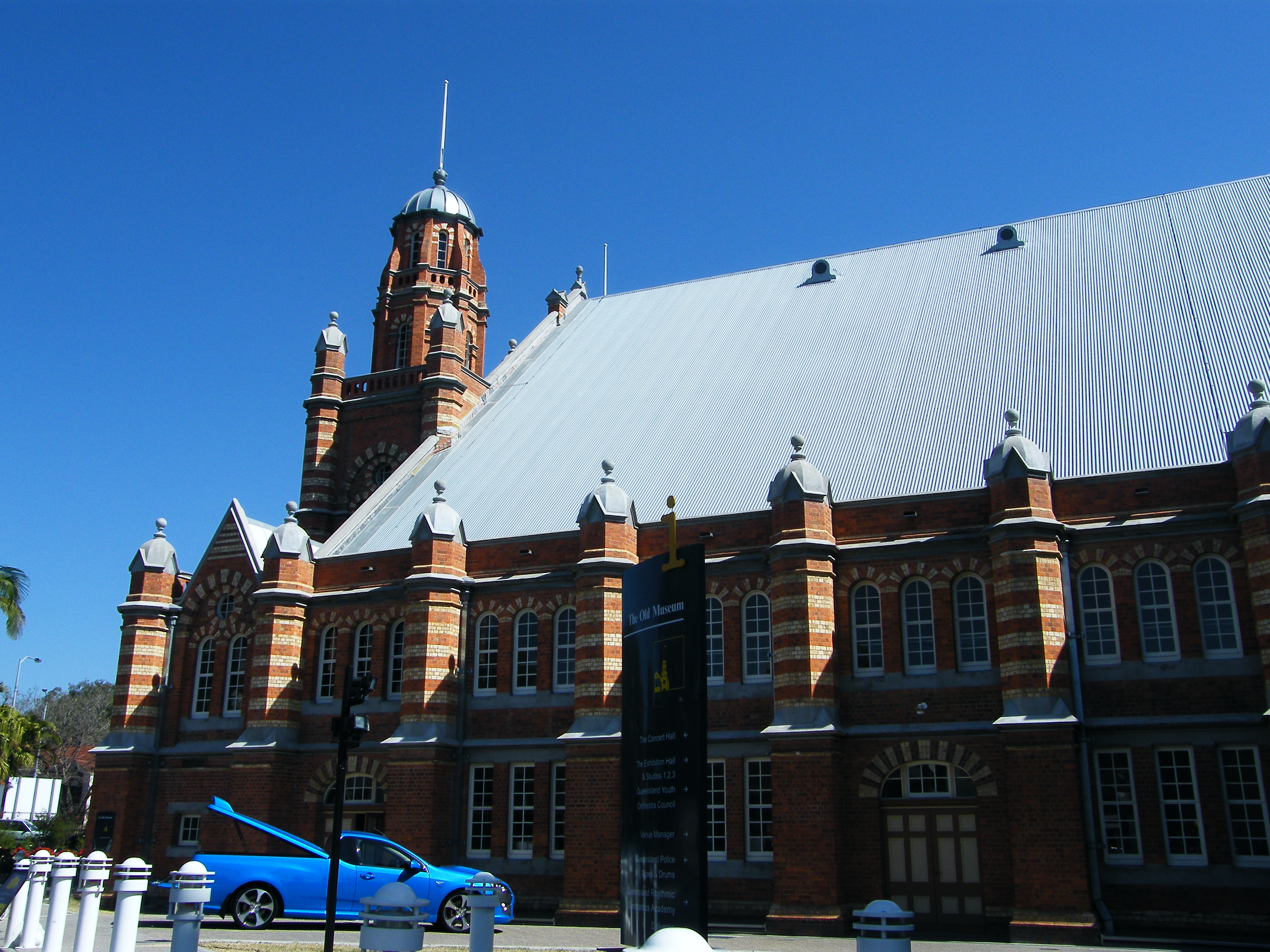
View over the roof and towers.

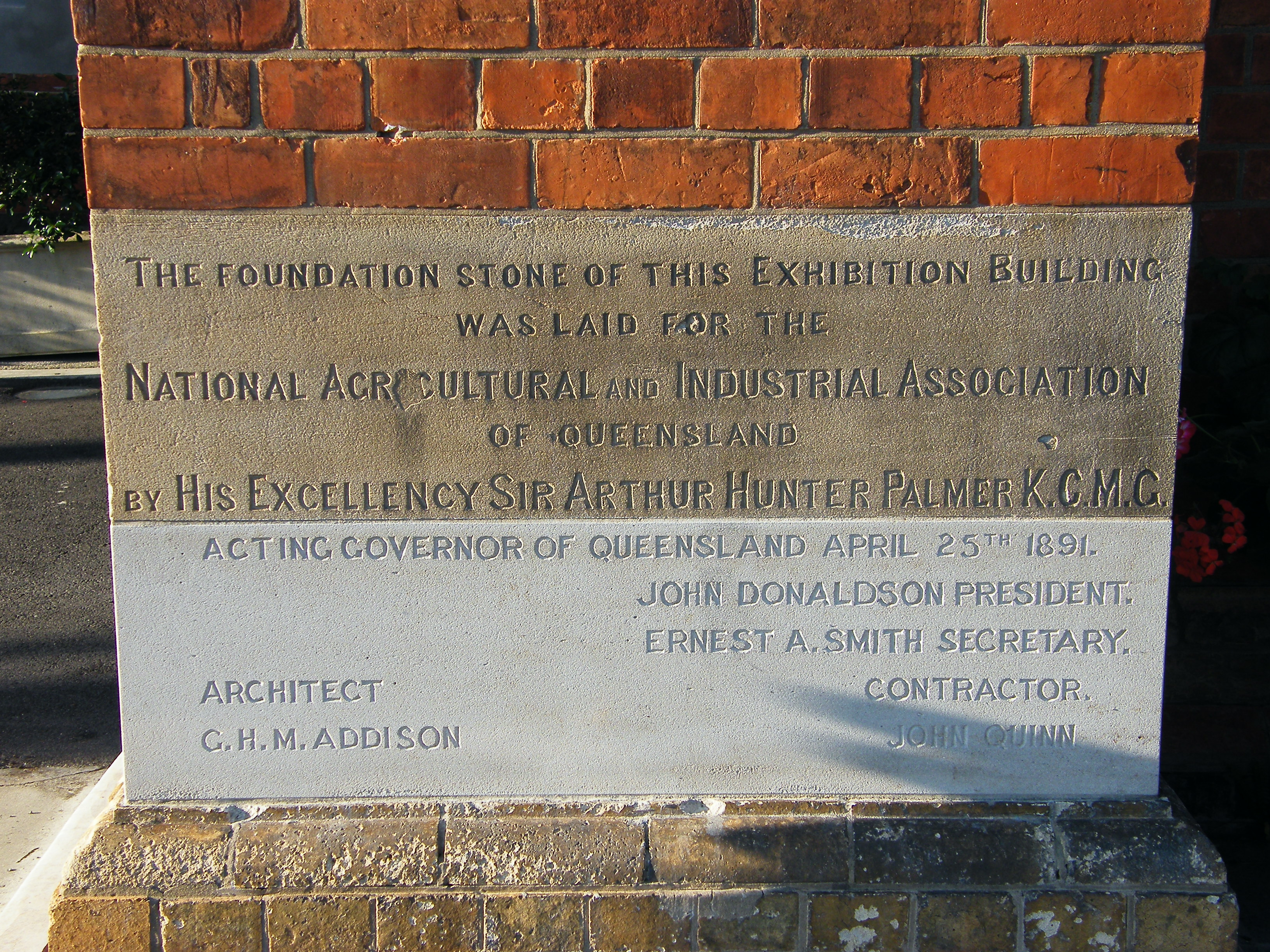
Foundation stone laid by Sir Arthur Hunter Palmer.

== Heritage listing ==
The building was listed on the Queensland Heritage Register on 21 October 1992.

In 2009 as part of the Q150 celebrations, the Old Museum Building was announced as one of the Q150 Icons of Queensland for its role as a "structure and engineering feat".
