= Queensland Wind and Brass =

- Concert band
- Short name: QWAB
- Founded: 1989 (36 years ago)
- Location: Brisbane, Australia
- Website: www.qwab.com.au

The Queensland Wind and Brass (QWAB) is a community wind ensemble based in Brisbane, Australia. It was formed in 1989 and is composed of approximately 55 amateur and professional musicians.

QWAB plays works written specifically for wind ensembles as well as arrangements of well known pieces. Their performances include themed concerts (From Russia With Love, Movies & Musicals etc.) as well as kids' concerts. QWAB also participates in local and national band competitions.

The group performs at venues throughout Brisbane including New Farm Park, Queen Street Mall, South Bank Parklands and the Old Museum Building. QWAB rehearses in the Old Museum Building.

Queensland Wind and Brass was formed in December 1989 and arose from a need for a high standard musical group for post-secondary musicians.

Since its inception, Queensland Wind and Brass has grown rapidly. In 1991, the group was the highest awarded concert band in the Queensland Festival of Music, Community Ensemble Section. In 1992 and again in 1999, Queensland Wind and Brass was the overall winner of this section where it was awarded the Most Outstanding Performance trophy. In 2001, QWAB came third in the A Grade National Band Competition and first in the A Grade Festival of Music. In 2005, 2006 and 2007 it was the highest awarded Wind Ensemble in the Brisbane City Council's “Battle of the Bands”.

The group consists of both amateur and professional woodwind, brass and percussion players, aged from 17 years upwards. New members are always welcome! Rehearsals currently take place on Tuesday evenings from 7:00pm in the Main Concert Hall of The Old Museum, Bowen Hills.

QWAB's performances include functions and special events, public outdoor venues such as the Brisbane City Mall, festivals and competitions... and of course concerts at major venues, including their "home", The Old Museum Concert Hall.

Themed concerts, such as Movies & Musicals are a QWAB specialty, appealing to a wide range of musical tastes and offering something for everyone.

The QWAB Kids’ Concerts are not only very entertaining for the young (and not-so-young!) audience members - they are carefully structured so as to provide a stimulating and inspiring educational experience for young children. Recent kids’ concerts have been enormously popular, featuring appearances by Darth Vader (standing in for the conductor) and Harry Potter's theme music.

View the QWAB events page for dates & details of QWAB performances.

QWAB is organised and operated by a dedicated committee consisting of current QWAB members and long-time friends of QWAB.

== See also ==
- Community band
- Music of Brisbane
- Arts and culture in Brisbane
