= Queensland Youth Orchestras =

Queensland Youth Orchestras (QYO) is one of the state's organisations for orchestral training and performance and is based at the Old Museum building in Gregory Terrace, Bowen Hills, Brisbane, Queensland, Australia.

Under the artistic leadership of Maestro Simon Hewett since 2020, QYO has 470 members aged from 9 to 24 in three symphony orchestras, two concert bands, two junior string ensembles (as of 2023), a chamber orchestra and a big band. Each group has its own annual program of rehearsals, tutorials, concerts and, in some cases, music camps and tours.

The leading orchestra, the Queensland Youth Symphony conducted by Simon Hewett, tours internationally every four years and performs an annual concert series at the Queensland Performing Arts Centre and The Old Museum.

Each October, around 640 musicians audition for QYO before a panel of professional musicians and over 500 musicians are offered positions in orchestras. Performing members of QYO must re-audition for a place each year alongside new applicants.

== Conductors ==
- Simon Hewett: Conductor of QYS (Queensland Youth Symphony (previously known as QYO1)) since 2020
- Paul Dean: Conductor of QYO2 (Second Queensland Youth Orchestra) since 2021.
- David Deacon: Conductor of QYO3 (Third Queensland Youth Orchestra) since 2021.
- Rob McWilliams: Conductor of the Wind Symphony since 2020.
- David Law: Conductor of the Wind Ensemble since 2009.
- Chen Yang: Conductor of the Junior String Ensemble since 1991.
- Bohdan Davison: Conductor of the Big Band since 2018.

== National Youth Concerto Competition ==
The John Curro National Youth Concerto Competition (NYCC) was established in 1976 by QYO founder John Curro (1932-2019). Open to string players (violin, viola, cello, and double bass) in Australia under the age of 18, the NYCC is the most prestigious competition of its kind in Australia. Up to four Recitalists are selected to perform recitals, and rehearse and perform as members of the Queensland Youth Symphony during Finals Week. Three finalists are selected to perform their concerto with the Queensland Youth Symphony at the Finals Concert each October, from which an overall winner is chosen.

== Photos of The Old Museum Building ==
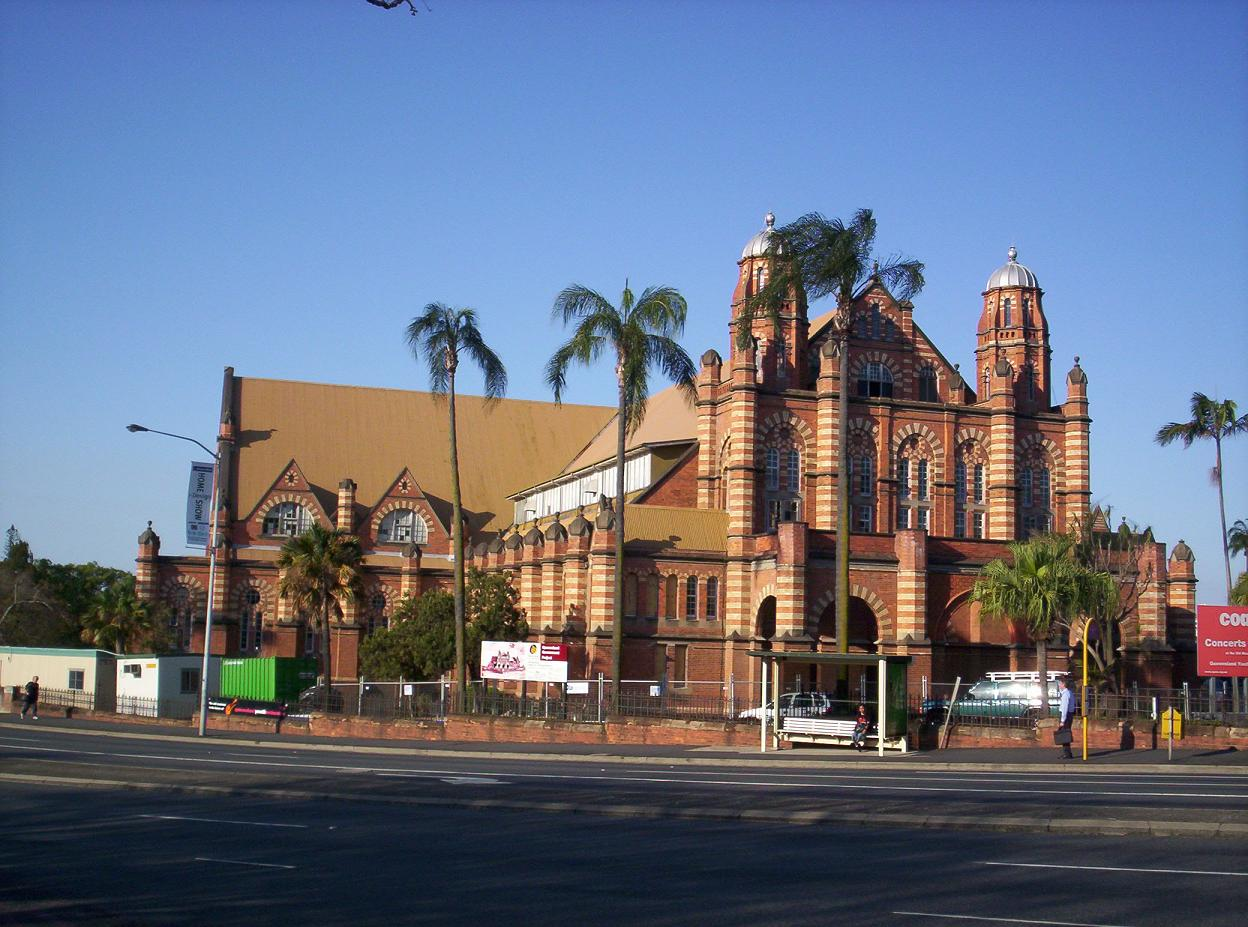
The Old Museum Building

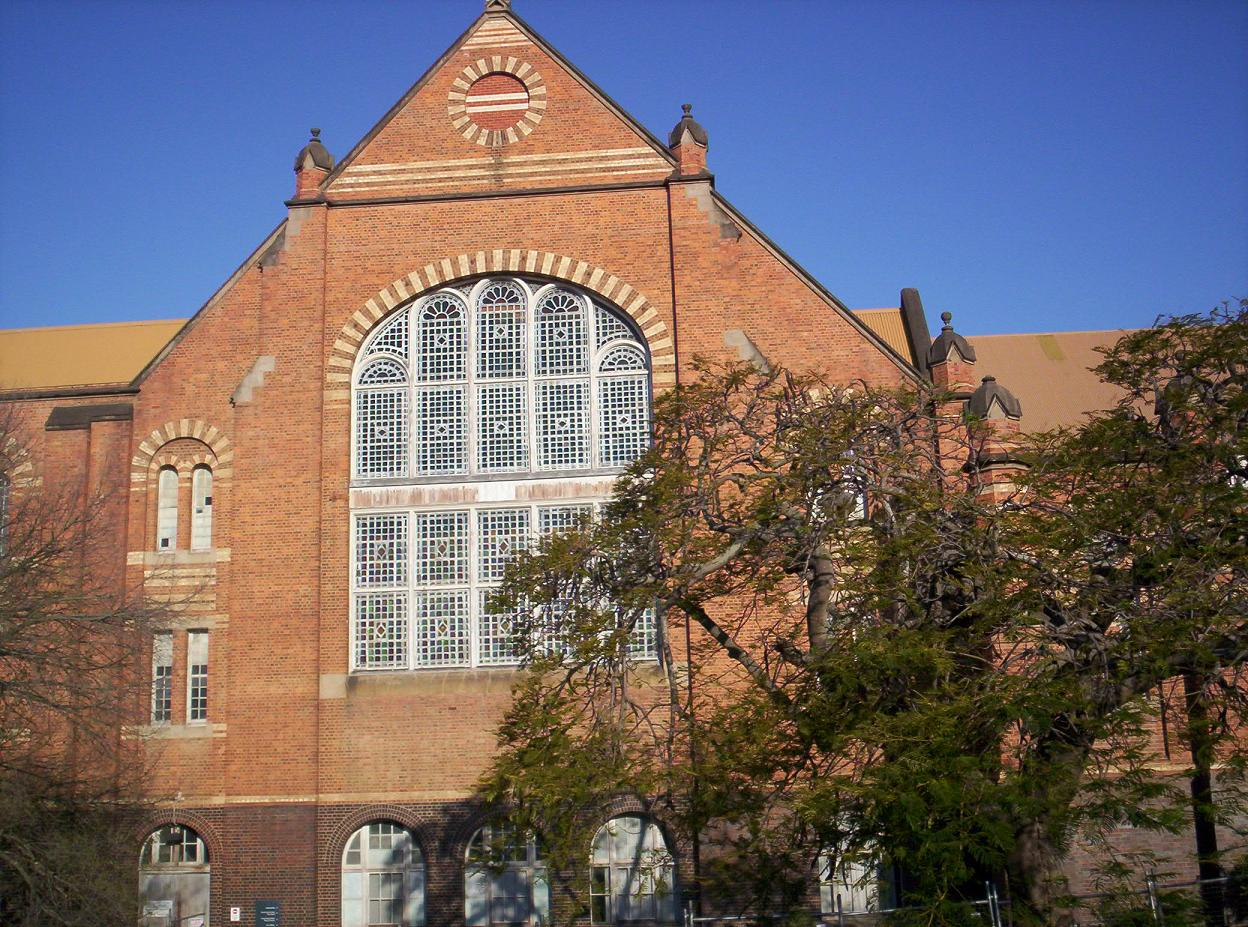
A side entrance to
the Old Museum building

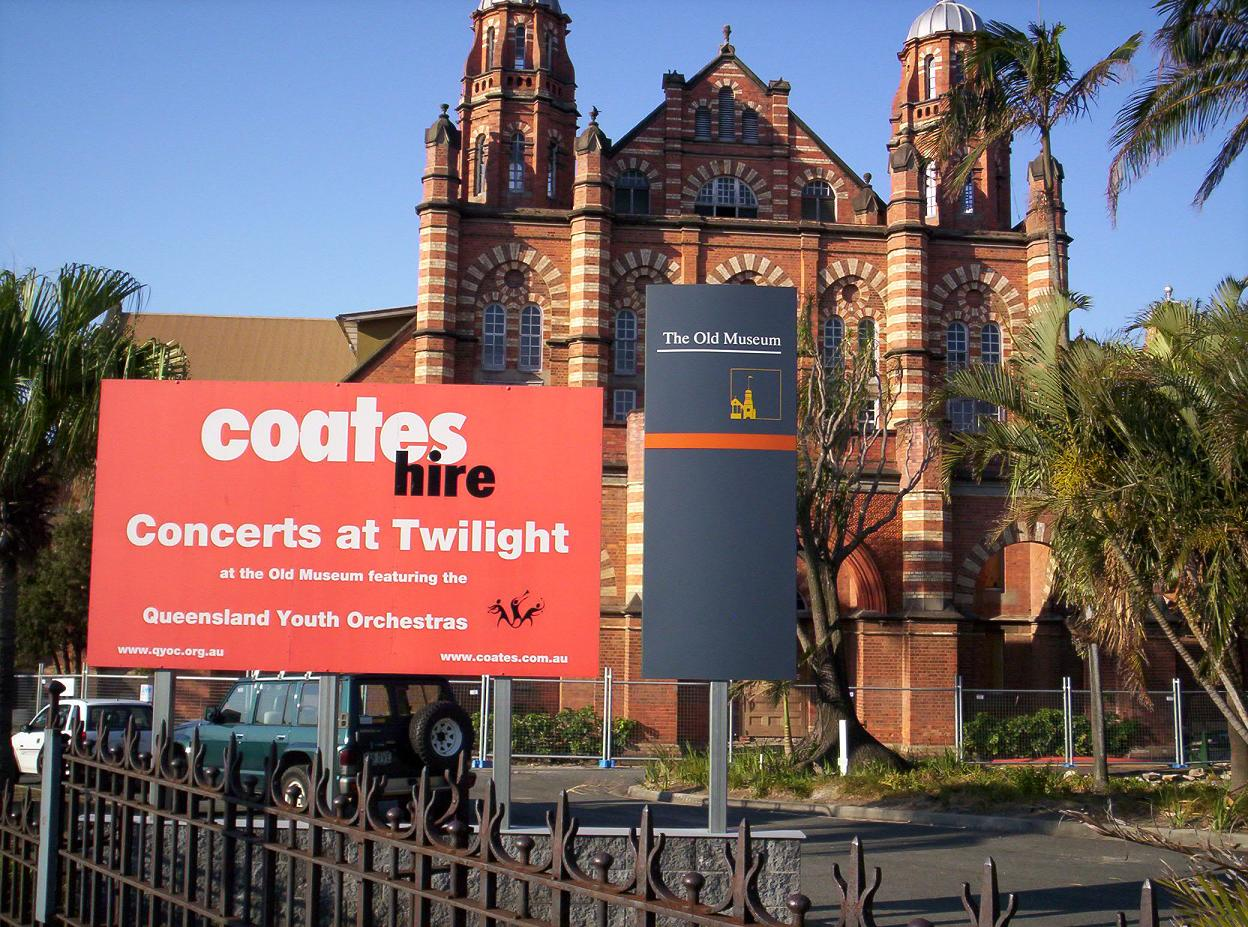
The Old Museum
( QYO concert announcements )

== See also ==
- List of youth orchestras
