= Michele McLaughlin =

- Born: 1974 (age 51–52)
- Origin: Salt Lake City Utah
- Genres: New-age
- Occupation: Pianist Composer
- Instruments: Piano
- Years active: 2000s–present
- Website: http://michelemclaughlin.com/

Michele McLaughlin (born 1974) is an American New-age music Billboard charts pianist and composer who has achieved over 1.8 billion music streams. She has released twenty-two albums and seven singles, many of which have received awards, nominations and favourable reviews.

A self-taught pianist and composer, McLaughlin played the instrument as a kindergartner. Inspired by a performance of George Winston's she saw at just eight years old, she applied herself to learn his tunes by ear and eventually began writing her own pieces. She released her first album Beginnings in 2000.

McLaughlin tours throughout the USA and performs regularly in her home town area of Salt Lake City, Utah.

Pianists she has performed with include Jennifer Thomas, Tim Neumark and Scott D. Davis.

== Selected awards and nominations ==
- 2023 Nomination - 'Home' for Album of the Year on Whisperings Solo Piano Radio
- 2022 Nominated "Album of the Year" on 2022 Whisperings Solo Piano Radio Awards
- 2021 Nominated "Album of the Year" on 2020 Whisperings Solo Piano Radio Awards
- 2020 Nominated "Album of the Year" on 2020 SoloPiano.com in the "Contemporary & Modern" Category
- 2020 Nominated "Album of the Year" on 2020 Whisperings Solo Piano Radio Awards
- 2020 Nominated "Album of the Year" on 2020 SoloPiano.com in the "Contemporary & Modern" Category
- 2019 Nominated "Best Solo Piano Album" in 2019 One World Music Awards
- 2019 Nominated "Best Piano Album" in 2019 Zone Music Reporter Awards
- 2018 Winner- Best Holiday/Christmas Album on 2018 SoloPiano.com Awards
- 2017 Winner - Utah Music Awards - Life
- 2017 Nominees and Finalists - American Songwriting Awards - Life
- 2017 Nominated - Just Plain Folks Music Awards - Breathing in the Moment
- 2017 Nominated "Album of the Year" in 2017 IMC Awards
- 2017 Nominated "Best Female Instrumental Artist" in 2017 IMC Awards
- 2017 Nominated "Best Instrumental Song" in 2017 IMC Awards (Give It Time, Stronger, At Home)
- 2017 Nominated "Best Instrumental Recording" in 2017 IMC Awards (Give It Time, Stronger, At Home)
- 2017 Winner - Best Instrumental Song in 2017 IMC Awards (Give It Time)
- 2017 Finalist - Best Instrumental Song in USA Songwriting Competition (The Gift)
- 2015 Nominated - The Indie Music Channel (IMC) Best Album Award - Undercurrent
- 2015 Nominated - The Hollywood Music in Media Awards™ (HMMA) - Undercurent
- 2015 Nominated - One World Music Radio Awards - Undercurrent '
- 2015 Nominated - The 15th Independent Music Award - The Space Between
- 2015 Finalist - The John Lennon Songwriting Contest - 11,000 Miles
- 2013 Winner - Whisperings Solo Piano Radio (founder David Nevue) album of the year - Waking the Muse
- 2012 Nominated - Independent Music Awards - Melancholy Snowfall

== Albums ==
- 2026 The Little Things
- 2024 Iceland
- 2022 Luminous
- 2021 Home
- 2020 Sketches
- 2019 Memoirs
- 2017 Life (reached number 7 New Age Albums Billboard charts March 4, 2017)
- 2015 Undercurrent (reached number 5 New Age Albums Billboard charts March 14, 2015)
- 2015 Top 20 Solo Piano
- 2013 Waking the Muse
- 2012 Breathing In the Moment
- 2010 Christmas Plain & Simple II
- 2010 Out of the Darkness
- 2008 A Celtic Dream
- 2007 Dedication
- 2006 Christmas Plain & Simple
- 2006 Reflections 2000-2005: The Best of Michele McLaughlin
- 2005 After the Storm
- 2004 The Beginning of Forever
- 2003 A Change of Color
- 2002 The Journey
- 2001 Elysium
- 2000 Beginnings

== Singles ==
- 2019 "Dark Moon"
- 2019 "Thankful"
- 2019 "Pure Joy"
- 2018 "Triumph"
- 2018 "Little Love"
- 2018 "My Life with You"
- 2017 "Dismissed"

== Reviews ==
- Rolling Stone feature
- Album Review Luminous
- Album Review - Life
- Album Review - Top 20
- Album Review - Undercurrent
- Album Review - Breathing in the Moment
- Album Review - Waking the Muse
- Song Review - Joffrey Ballet - Contemporary Choreographers - Crossing Ashland - Perseverance
