= Signore, ascolta! =

Aria from Turandot by Puccini

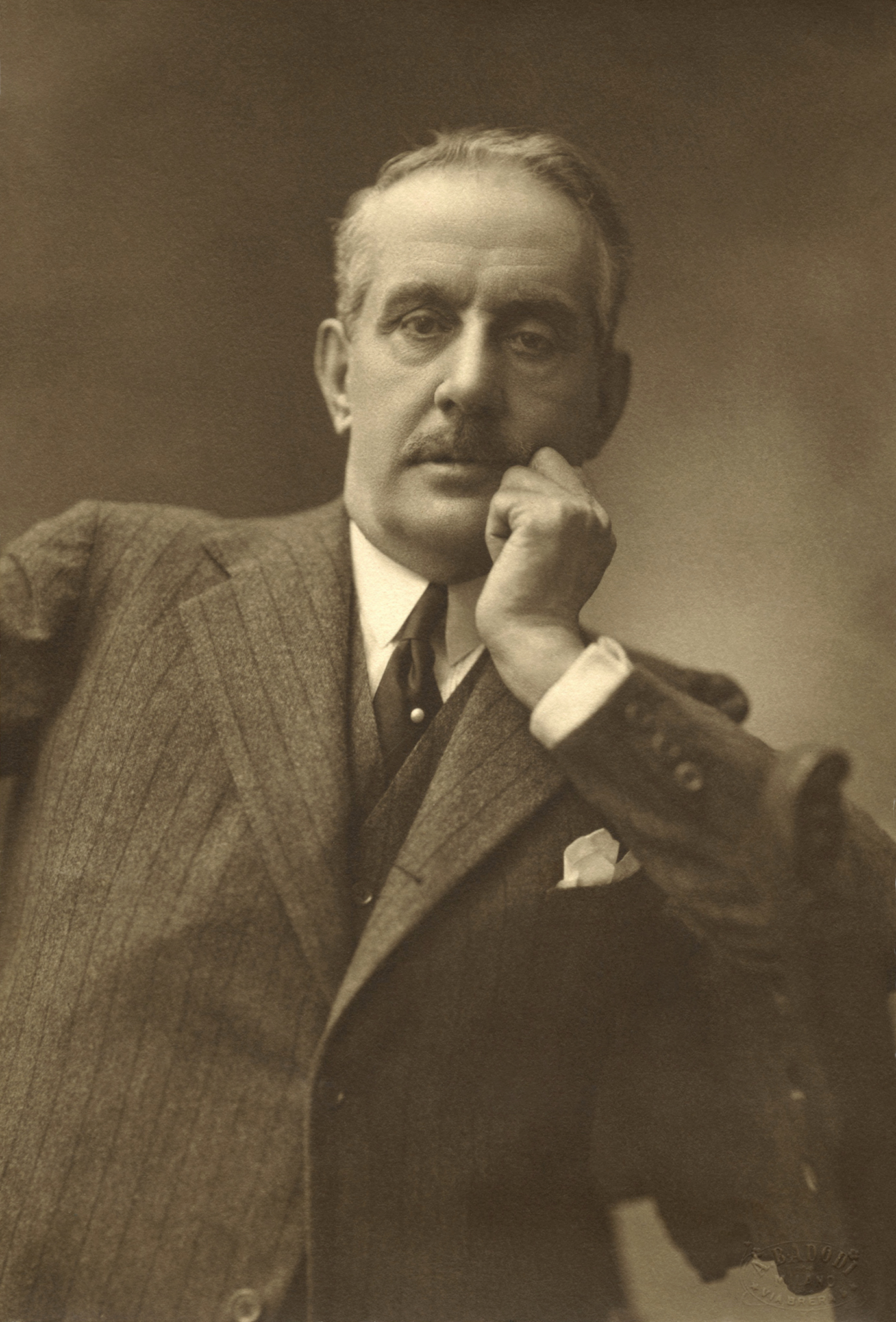
Giacomo Puccini in 1924

"Signore, ascolta!" ("My lord, listen!") is a soprano aria in act one of the opera Turandot by Giacomo Puccini. The Italian lyrics were written by Giuseppe Adami and Renato Simoni.

It is sung by Liù (a slave girl) to Prince Calaf, with whom she is secretly in love. Liù sings this aria begging Calaf not to risk his life for his love to a beautiful but cold Princess Turandot, who set a condition that any man who wishes to marry her must first answer her three riddles, and if he fails, he will be beheaded.

Liù's words touch the Prince's heart, and he replies with "Non piangere, Liù" ("Don't cry, Liù").

== Libretto ==
Signore, ascolta! Deh!, signore, ascolta!
Liù non regge più!
Si spezza il cuore!
Ahimè, quanto cammino
col tuo nome nell'anima
col nome tuo sulle labbra!
Ma se il tuo destino,
doman, sarà deciso,
noi morrem sulla strada dell'esilio.
Ei perderà suo figlio...
io l'ombra d'un sorriso!
Liù non regge più!
ha pietà!

Sir, listen! Oh! Sir, listen!
Liù can bear it no more!
My heart is breaking!
Alas, how long have I travelled
with your name in my soul,
your name on my lips!
But if your fate
is decided tomorrow
we'll die on the road to exile!
He will lose his son...
And I, the shadow of a smile!
Liù can bear it no more!
Ah, have pity!
