= Opera Bohemia =

- Type: Theatre group
- Location: Scotland
- Artistic director(s): Douglas Nairne and Alistair Digges
- Website: operabohemia.co.uk

Opera Bohemia is an opera company based in Scotland that performs operas throughout the country. The operas are adapted for small venues and are often performed in remote communities. The company began presenting operas in 2010.

== History ==
Opera Bohemia was established by two Scottish musicians, conductor Alistair Digges and baritone Douglas Nairne, with the aim of presenting opera across Scotland, introducing opera to a wider audience, especially to a younger generation, and creating opportunities for young artists. Opera performances have taken place towns and cities all across Scotland, from the Isle of Skye in the West Highlands, to the east coast, to the Scottish borders, to the Central Belt and to the Edinburgh Festival Fringe. Operas are adapted for a small stage and a small cast with no chorus. A piano and solo instrument often replace an orchestra. For larger scale performances the company performs with The Bohemia Ensemble, a chamber orchestra.

== Productions and performers ==
Each new production leads to tours which include remote and small venues. The company has staged productions of La bohème, Lucia Di Lammermoor, Madama Butterfly (including at the Perth Festival of the Arts), Eugene Onegin, Gianni Schicchi, Les pêcheurs de perles, La traviata, The Marriage of Figaro, Tosca and Falstaff. A 10th anniversary tour of The Merry Widow toured 18 venues and reached an audience of four thousand people across Scotland. The company has toured twice to England including a performance of Madama Butterfly in London's Middle Temple. In the first Edinburgh Festival Fringe production of La Bohème, Mimi was played by international star Pumeza Matshikiza. For Donizetti's Lucia di Lammermoor in 2012 another international star, Australian soprano Suzanne Shakespeare, performed Lucia. Regular lead performers include the soprano Catriona Clark and baritone Andrew McTaggart. Alistair Digges has conducted all orchestral performances. Directors have included John Wilkie, Tom Cooper, Douglas Nairne, Adrian Osmond, Lissa Lorenzo and Oliver Platt. Designers have included Alisa Kalyanova, Kenneth MacLeod and Magnus Popplewell.

== Funding ==
Opera Bohemia has received Creative Scotland Lottery Funding and funding from a number of trusts, companies and individuals.
