= Freedom Come-All-Ye =

Scots folk song

The "Freedom Come-All-Ye" (Scottish Gaelic: Thig Saorsa Uile) is a Scots language song written by Hamish Henderson in 1960.

== History ==
An early two-stanza version of the song was published in a broadsheet "Writers against Aparthied" (sic) in the Spring of 1960; as the first line refers to Harold Macmillan's Wind of Change speech, given in February of that year, the composition can be dated quite precisely. Henderson was recorded singing the complete 3-stanza version of the song that year.

The song's tune is an adaptation of the World War I pipe march "The Bloody Fields of Flanders", composed by John McLellan DCM (Dunoon), which Henderson first heard played on the Anzio beachhead. He wrote the lyrics after discussions with Ken Goldstein, an American researcher at the School of Scottish Studies, who had enjoyed Henderson's rendition of the tune. It was subsequently adopted by Glasgow Peace Marcher CND demonstrators and the anti-Polaris campaign (for example, notably at the anti-Polaris protests at Holy Loch in 1961).

A product of the Scottish folk revival, and originally a 1960s protest song, it is still popular in Scotland and overseas, especially as an anthem of Scottish Socialists. Henderson described the song as "expressing my hopes for Scotland, and for the survival of humanity on this beleaguered planet.". It has been suggested as choice for a Scottish national anthem (although there is no official Scottish anthem), though Henderson felt that part of its strength lies in the fact that it is an alternative, "International Anthem".

A version of the song was performed by South African soprano Pumeza Matshikiza at the opening ceremony of the 2014 Commonwealth Games.
