= Pianissimo (disambiguation) =

Pianissimo is a term in music dynamics meaning "to be played very softly."

Pianissimo may also refer to:

- Pianissimo, a 1990 album by Suzanne Ciani
- Pianissimo, a part of the Requiem trilogy by Virgin Black

== See also ==
- Giuoco Pianissimo, a chess opening
- Pianissimo Peche, a brand of Japanese cigarettes made by Japan Tobacco
- Now Pianissimo, an album in the Now That's What I Call Music! series
