= Simon Hewett =

Australian conductor

- Born: Seattle, Washington, U.S.
- Education: University of Queensland
- Occupation: Conductor
- Organizations: Hamburg Ballet; Staatsoper Stuttgart
- Website: www.simon-hewett.com

Simon Hewett is an Australian conductor focused on ballet, as principal conductor of the Hamburg Ballet from 2005 to 2023. He conducted operas at Opera Australia and the Staatsoper Stuttgart, among others.

== Life and career ==
Hewett was born in Seattle. He studied clarinet and conducting at the University of Queensland. He was the youngest finalist of the ABC Young Performers Awards at age 19.

Hewett worked with the ELISION Ensemble on contemporary music from 1996, touring worldwide including Korea and Europe. They performed world premieres including Liza Lim's Moon Spirit Feasting and Richard Barrett's Opening of the Mouth. The latter was part of the 1997 Perth Festival, and its recording of the latter was chosen as Recording of the Month by BBC Music Magazine.

Hewett received a scholarship from German Academic Exchange Service to study further at the University of Music Franz Liszt Weimar from 1998 to 2001.

He worked first as assistant to the general music director of Opera Australia in Sydney where he made his debut as conductor with Bizet's Les pêcheurs de perles in 2003. He also conducted the revival of Verdi's Otello, directed by Harry Kupfer, and new productions of Mozart's Così fan tutte and Le nozze di Figaro, Verdi's Aida and Macbeth, as well as Salome by Richard Strauss, and in Perth Verdi's Falstaff.

Hewett was appointed as Kapellmeister and assistant to the GMD at the Hamburg State Opera by Simone Young in 2005, and was principal ballet conductor from 2009, where he conducted more than 200 performances of opera and ballet, including new productions of John Neumeier's ballets Mahler's Seventh and Tenth Symphonies and Tatiana composed by Lera Auerbach in Hamburg. He led the music for a ballet on Mahler's Third Symphony at the Paris Opéra.

Hewett first conducted at the Komische Oper Berlin, Rossini's Il barbiere di Siviglia, and at the Staatsoper Stuttgart in 2011, Wagner's Der fliegende Holländer. He was appointment First Kapellmeister there and conducted Weber's Der Freischütz, Die Fledermaus by J. Strauss, Verdi's Nabucco, Puccini's Madama Butterfly, Tosca and a new production of La bohème, Tchaikovsky's Eugene Onegin, and Mussorgsky's Khovanshchina.

Hewett conducted several DVD recordings of ballets for Naxos.

Hewett moved to Brisbane in 2021 to be music director of the Queensland Youth Orchestras.
