= Staatsorchester Stuttgart =

German symphony orchestra

The Staatsorchester Stuttgart (Stuttgart State Orchestra; full name, Württembergisches Staatsorchester oder Orchester der Württembergischen Staatstheater) is a German symphony orchestra based in Stuttgart. The orchestra is resident at the Staatstheater Stuttgart, where it performs for productions of the Staatsoper Stuttgart and the Stuttgart Ballet, and regularly gives concerts at the Liederhalle (Beethovensaal).

== History ==
The historical roots of the orchestra trace back to the Württembergische Hofkapelle. The orchestra celebrated its 425th anniversary in 2018.

In 2002, the orchestra was awarded as "Orchestra of the year" based on a poll of the magazine Opernwelt.

The current Generalmusikdirektor (GMD) of the orchestra is Cornelius Meister, since 2018, appointed with an initial contract of six seasons. In October 2022, the orchestra announced the extension of Meister's contract as GMD through 2026.

== Music directors (GMD) ==
- 1918–1922: Fritz Busch
- 1922–1937: Carl Leonhardt
- 1937–1942: Herbert Albert
- 1947–1969: Ferdinand Leitner
- 1970–1972: Václav Neumann
- 1972–1980: Silvio Varviso
- 1980–1987: Dennis Russell Davies
- 1987–1991: Luis Antonio García Navarro
- 1992–1997: Gabriele Ferro
- 1997–2006: Lothar Zagrosek
- 2007–2011: Manfred Honeck
- 2012–2018: Sylvain Cambreling
- 2018–present: Cornelius Meister
