= Non piangere, Liù =

Aria in Puccini's opera Turandot

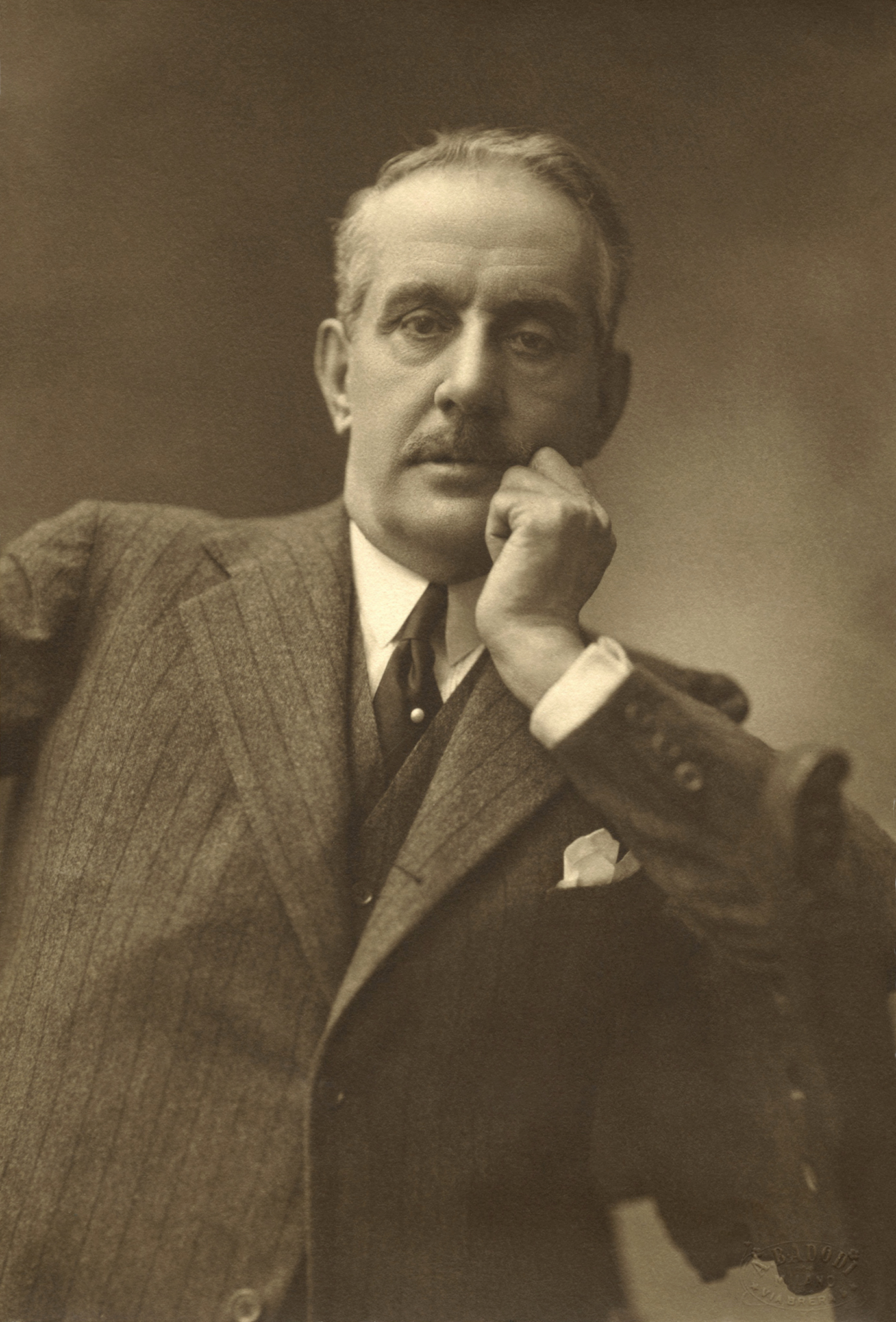
Giacomo Puccini, 1924

"Non piangere, Liù" ("Don't cry, Liù") is an aria sung by Calàf, the "Unknown Prince", in act one of the Italian opera Turandot by Giacomo Puccini. The lyrics were written by Giuseppe Adami and Renato Simoni. The scene takes place before the walls of the imperial palace. In the preceding aria ("Signore, ascolta!" - "My lord, listen!"), Liù begs Calàf not to risk his life by playing a deadly game to marry Princess Turandot, and Calàf responds to her gently, asking her not to cry.

== Libretto ==
Non piangere, Liù
se in un lontano giorno
io t'ho sorriso
per quel sorriso,
dolce mia fanciulla
m'ascolta
il tuo signore
sarà, domani,
forse, solo al mondo
Non lo lasciare...
portalo via con te
Dell'esilio,
addolcisci a lui le strade
Questo...questo,
o mia povera Liù,
al tuo piccolo cuore
che non cade
chiede colui
che non sorride più!

Do not cry, Liù,
If on a day long ago
I smiled at you;
For that smile,
My sweet girl,
Listen to me:
Your lord
will be, tomorrow,
perhaps, left alone in the world.
Do not leave him behind...
take him with you;
Of exile,
Ease for him the paths.
This... this,
oh my poor Liù,
of your modest heart
that does not faint
asks he
who smiles no more!
