= Shaun Bonétt =

Australian businessman and property developer

- Born: Shaun Keith Alfred Bonétt; 1 January 1971 (age 55); London, England
- Education: Saint Ignatius' College, Adelaide
- Alma mater: University of Adelaide; University of South Australia
- Occupations: Entrepreneur and property developer
- Spouse: Vanessa Bonétt (née Baron) (m. 2004)
- Children: 2
- Parent(s): Anton and Marlene Bonétt
- Awards: Sovereign Military Order of Malta; Honorary Doctorate (University of South Australia)

Shaun Bonétt (born 1 January 1971) is an Australian entrepreneur and property developer who founded and is CEO of the Precision Group.

== Early life ==
Shaun Bonétt was born in London, England, to parents of Australian and Maltese descent, Marlene and Anton Bonétt, the latter of whom was an oncologist for the World Health Organization. Bonett moved to Australia in 1978 and studied at Saint Ignatius' College, Adelaide. In the 1980s, Bonétt worked as a law clerk in Adelaide, and studied at the University of Adelaide, graduating in 1991 with a Bachelor of Laws and Arts. Bonétt is also a graduate of the University of South Australia.

== Career ==
Bonétt worked for the law firm Thomson Simmons & Co from 1990 to 1996 and then as a Senior Associate at Phillips Fox from 1996 to 1998.

In 1994 when he was 24 years old, Bonétt founded Precision Group, a property investment and management company, and was involved in the re-positioning of MacArthur Central, and collaborated with the Bank of China to purchase the Chevron Renaissance shopping centre. Bonétt also negotiated the establishment of a Tiffany & Company outlet in Adelaide Central Plaza, along with three other international retailers, including David Jones.

In 2003 Bonétt joined the board of directors of iSelect Health & Life Insurance, in 2005 he joined the board of Lenders Direct, and in 2007 he joined the board and became Chairman of Litigation Lending Services. In 2018 Bonétt acquired a material stake and board seat in the data analytics ASX listed company Skyfii Limited.

In May 2006, Bonétt negotiated one of the largest property swap transactions in Australian history, when he swapped Precision Group's property at 160 Ann Street, Brisbane for MacArthur Central in Brisbane, in a $186 million swap transaction.

In 2010 Bonétt's Precision Group was the first private Australian businesses to undertake various finance transactions with the Bank of China and Bonétt subsequently made submissions to the Foreign Investment Review Board ("FIRB") to enable more Australian businesses to access loans from International banks without having to first obtain FIRB approval. In 2015 Bonétt also actively supported and made representations to Government for Australia's free trade agreement with China.

In 2022, the University of South Australia conferred to Bonétt an honorary doctorate.

== Personal life ==
In 2004, Bonétt married model, Vanessa Baron. As of 2021, they have a daughter, Eve, and a son, Gabriel.

=== Net worth ===
Bonétt debuted on the Business Review Weekly (BRW) Young Rich List in 2006 placing third with a net worth of A$220 million and was ranked as Australia's Richest Person 40 and Under in 2007–2008. As of May 2025, Bonétt's net worth was estimated by Australian Financial Review to be A$1.70 billion. In 2019 Bonétt's net worth was estimated by The Australian to be A$1.17 billion.

Year	Financial Review Rich List		Forbes Australia's 50 Richest	
Year	Rank	Net worth (A$)	Rank	Net worth (US$)
2015		$478 million ▲		
2016				
2017		$718 million ▲		
2018	96 ▲	$784 million ▲		
2019	90 ▲	$1.00 billion ▲		
2020	99 ▼	$1.06 billion ▲		
2021	101 ▼	$1.17 billion ▲		
2022	61 ▲	$1.90 billion ▲		
2023	53 ▲	$2.31 billion ▲		
2024		$1.70 billion ▼		
2025	103	$1.70 billion		

Legend
Icon	Description
Steady	Has not changed from the previous year
▲	Has increased from the previous year
▼	Has decreased from the previous year
