= MacArthur Chambers =

Heritage listed building in Brisbane, Queensland

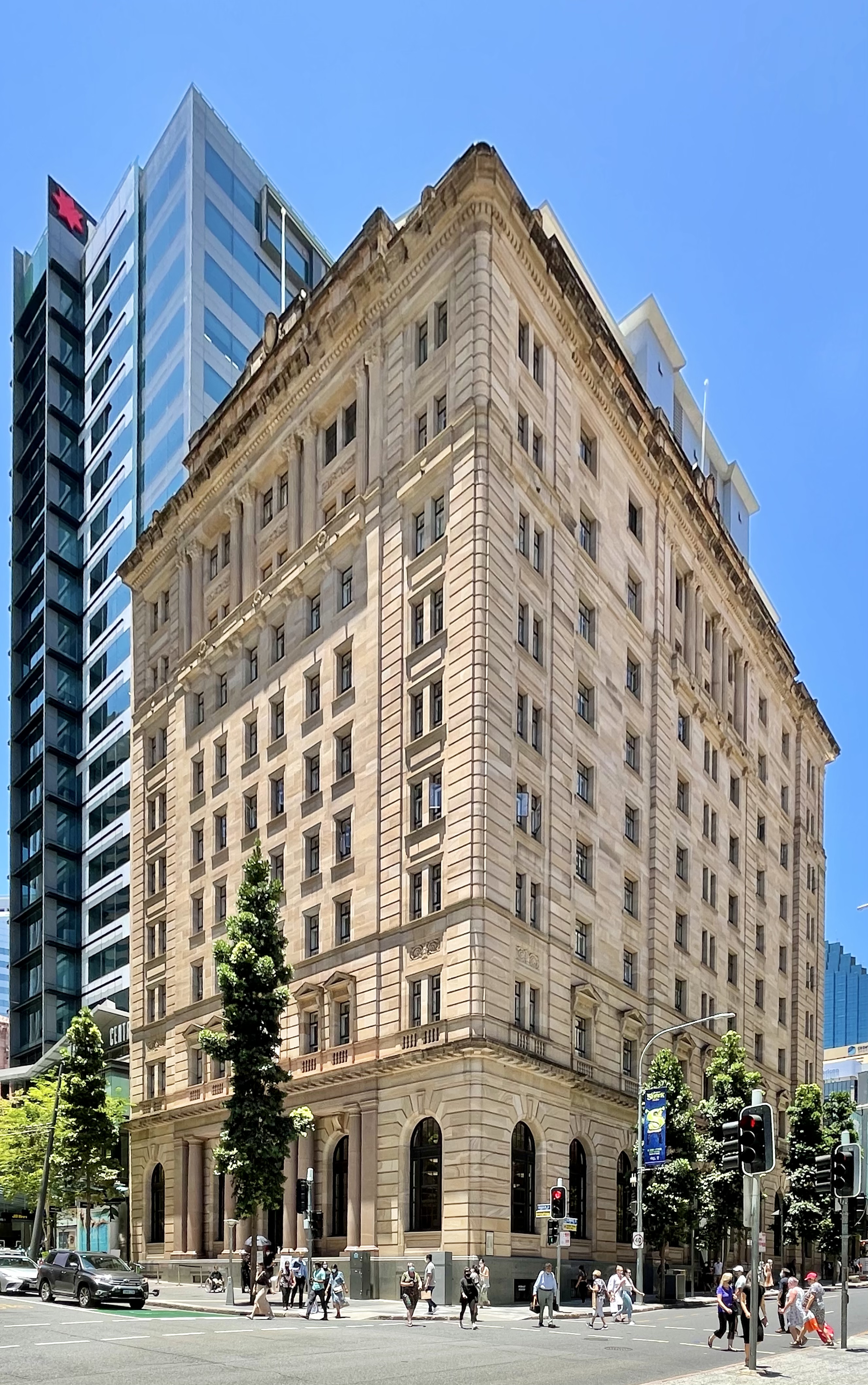
- MacArthur Chambers, 2021

- Location within Queensland
- 27.4684°S 153.0273°E
- Location: 229 Queen Street, Brisbane City, City of Brisbane, Queensland, Australia

History
- Design period: 1919–1930s (interwar period)
- Built: 1931–1934

Site notes
- Architect: Francis Richard Hall
- Owner: Precision Group

Queensland Heritage Register
- Official name: MacArthur Chambers, AMP Building
- Type: state heritage (built)
- Designated: 21 October 1992
- Reference no.: 600147
- Significant period: 1931–1934 (fabric); 1934–1978, 1942–1945 (historical)
- Significant components: banking chamber, furniture/fittings
- Builders: George Alexander Stronach

MacArthur Chambers is a heritage-listed former office building at 229 Queen Street (corner of Edward Street), Brisbane City, City of Brisbane, Queensland, Australia. It was designed by Francis Richard Hall and built from 1931 to 1934 by George Alexander Stronach. It was also known as the AMP Building. It was added to the Queensland Heritage Register on 21 October 1992.

The MacArthur Chambers building and sites adjacent to the building, comprising an entire city block, were redeveloped in the late 1990s, creating the shopping mall MacArthur Central. In 2016, MacArthur Chambers contains the MacArthur Chambers Apartment Hotel, the MacArthur Museum and an Apple Store.

== History ==
This building was constructed between 1931 and 1934 as the Queensland headquarters of the Australian Mutual Provident Society (AMP), replacing two earlier AMP buildings on the site (built in 1877–1879 and 1885).

The AMP Society was formed in Sydney, New South Wales in 1848–1849 under the Friendly Society's Act of 1843, and was one of a number of benefit and friendly societies established in the Australian colonies in the mid to late 19th century. Founded by a group of prominent Sydney philanthropists, the AMP Society initially offered life assurance policies, endowments and annuities aimed principally at ensuring that women and children were not left destitute on the death of the principal income earner. Growth in the early 1850s was slow, but in 1857 the Society was incorporated by act of parliament, and by the 1890s it was the most prominent of the Australian benefit and insurance societies, with a worldwide reputation.

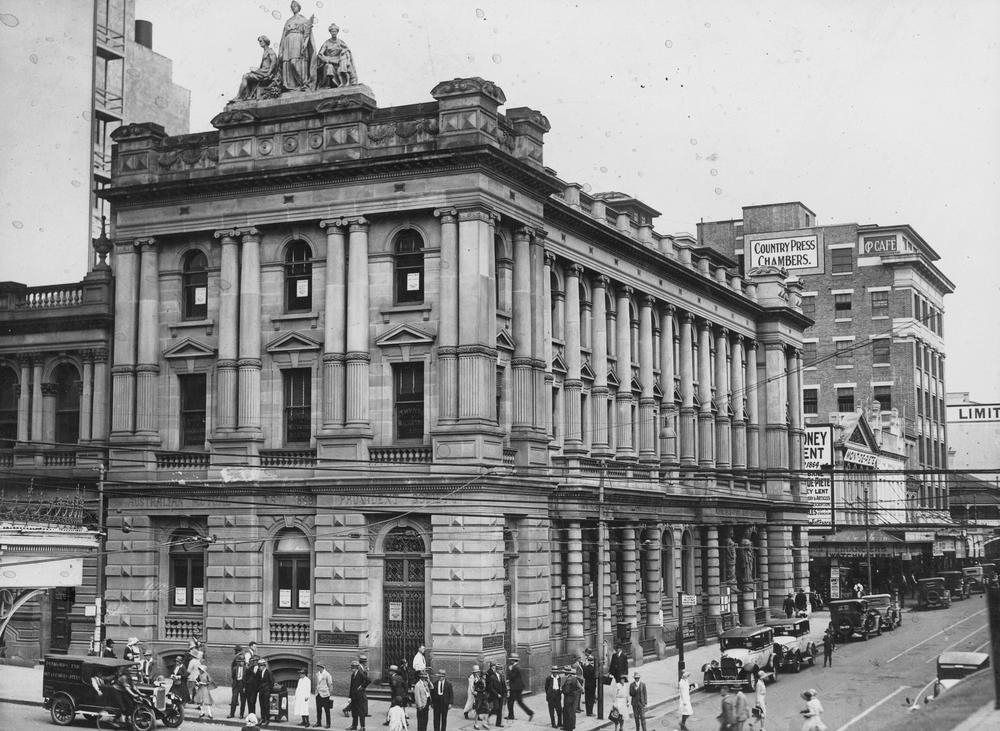
AMP Building built in 1885, prior to its demolition circa 1932

The first Queensland office (an agency) was opened in Brisbane in 1875. Purpose-designed offices were erected for the AMP in Brisbane in 1877–1879 and 1885 at the corner of Queen and Edward Streets, but these were replaced by the 1931–1934 building. It was a measure of the success of the society that its new Queensland headquarters were erected during the worst years of the 1930s depression.

Designed by established Brisbane architects Francis Richard Hall and Harold M Cook, the offices were constructed by local master builder George A Stronach (overseer Thomas Percy) with technical supervision by consulting Brisbane structural engineer RJ McWilliam, for approximately £255,000. Contemporary reports described the quality Australian materials, the high standard of craftsmanship, and the modern engineering techniques employed. The marble used throughout the building came from New South Wales and the building was faced with Helidon freestone. The granite used for the base was tested by the University of Queensland before construction, and was declared to be the finest granite in existence, with a crushing strength of 1,365 long ton/in^{2} (21.08 GPa). Queensland company Evans Deakin & Co. Ltd manufactured the 1,150 long tons (1,170 t) of steelwork used in the building. The five girders spanning the ground floor banking chamber have a span of 43 feet (13 m) and each weighs 24 long tons (24 t). Construction of the steel framework using bolts rather than rivets was considered particularly innovative in Brisbane in 1932.

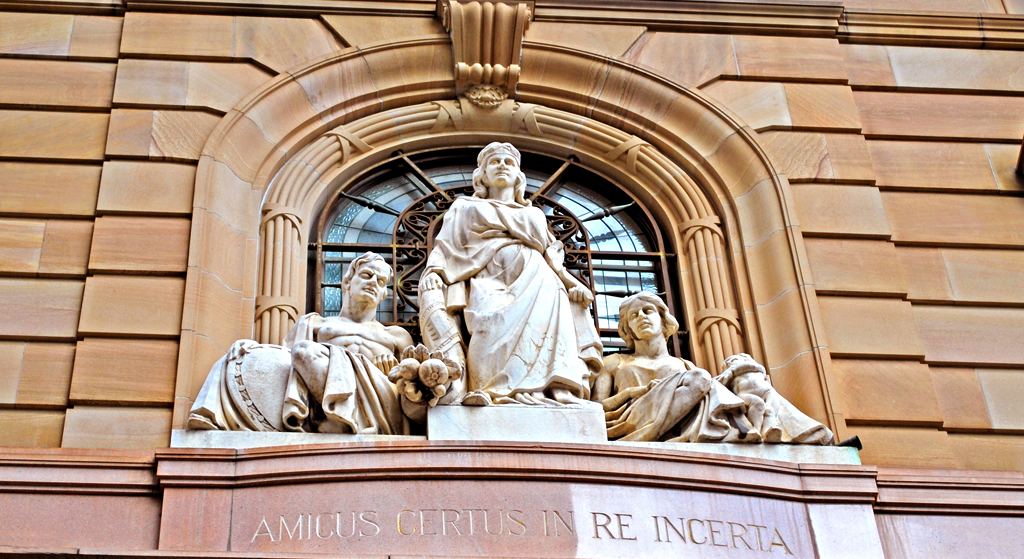
AMP Statuary on MacArthur Chambers, 2012

The emblematic statuary above the main entrance in Queen Street was carved by Fred Gowan of Sydney from Sicilian marble. The tableau illustrates the Society's motto Amicus certus in re incerta (a certain friend in uncertain times) and depicts an erect female figure, with a cornucopia by her right side, holding the palm of victory in her left hand. To her left is a seated woman and child; to her right a seated male. Until c. 1980 when the logo was changed, an Amicus tableau was erected on almost every AMP building, and usually was removed when the Society no longer occupied the premises. However, when the Society moved to new premises in Brisbane in 1978, the Amicus tableau remained on the Queen Street building.

The ground floor contained the vestibule, the manager's office and a spacious banking chamber, 136 ft × 87 ft (41 m × 27 m). The board room with adjoining luncheon room was on the eighth floor and featured a parquetry floor of Queensland timbers. Staff offices and facilities were provided on the seventh, eighth and ninth floors. The remainder of the building was tenanted.

The AMP building was one of several high-rise buildings erected in Queen Street in the 1920s and early 1930s. These included Ascot Chambers (1925), National Mutual Life Building (1926) and Colonial Mutual Life Building (1931, now the Manor Apartment Hotel).

The AMP building was officially opened on Friday 2 March 1934 by the Queensland Governor, Sir Leslie Orme Wilson.

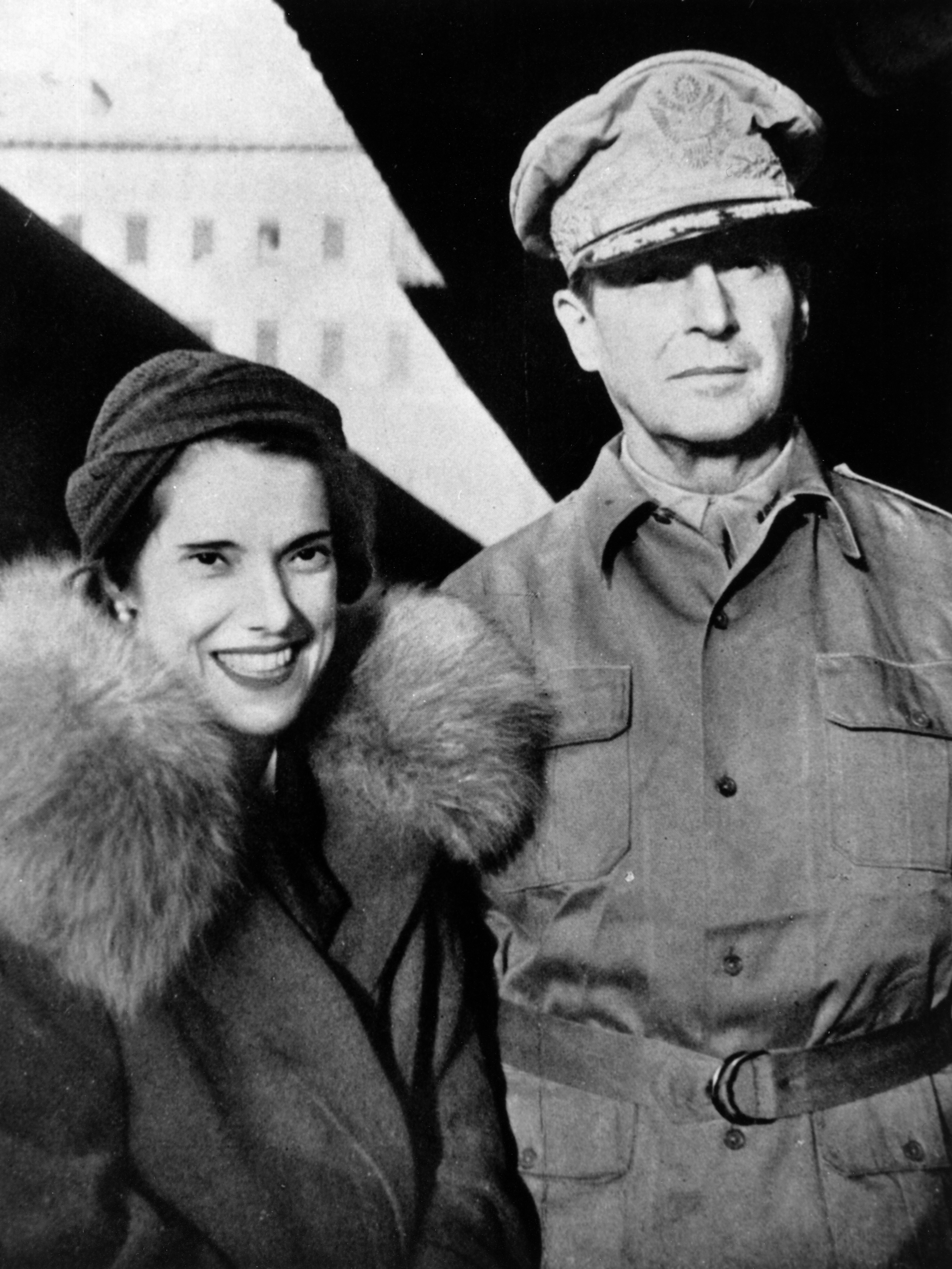
General Douglas MacArthur and Mrs Jean Marie MacArthur, Brisbane, 1942

Because of its central location and reinforced concrete roof, the building was used as the headquarters of the Allied Forces in the South-West Pacific during the Second World War. Tenants were compulsorily evacuated under military orders from 21 July 1942 until 14 June 1945. The AMP Society reserved the basement and part of the ground floor, while the Commander-in-Chief of Allied Forces in South West Pacific Area, General Douglas MacArthur occupied the board room and his staff occupied the remainder of the building.

After the Second World War the building reverted to its former use as the AMP's Queensland headquarters until February 1978 when the Society moved to AMP Place in Eagle Street. In 1979 the ground and mezzanine floors were refurbished and leased as retail premises and offices. The building was re-opened and named MacArthur Chambers in honour of General MacArthur. In November 1990 the Brisbane City Council acquired MacArthur Chambers.

The MacArthur Chambers building and sites adjacent to the building, comprising an entire city block, were redeveloped in the late 1990s, creating the shopping mall MacArthur Central. In 2016, MacArthur Chambers contains the MacArthur Chambers Apartment Hotel, the MacArthur Museum and an Apple Store which was redeveloped and is owned by the Precision Group.

== Description ==
MacArthur Chambers, an interwar commercial building, is located on the corner of Queen and Edward Streets. Comprising nine storeys with an attic and basement, the building has a concrete encased steel frame with an external shell consisting of a granite base and Helidon freestone facing.

The street facades are arranged symmetrically. The openings on the ground level are all arched. The stone facing of the ground and first floor levels is separated into horizontal bands which radiate from around the arches imitating voussoirs. These continue up the side bays of the building to the top level. The central bays, between the second and seventh floors have flush stonework. The three central bays above the seventh floor have a Corinthian colonnade that corresponds to that on the ground level. A dentilled cornice line occurs above ground level above which is a plinth with balusters in front of the window openings. Another horizontal cornice line runs at the seventh floor level which has a plinth above it. The entablature has a large dentilled cornice supporting a parapet with a raised section corresponding to the three central bays.

The Edward Street facade is longer but also symmetrical. The central window bays are flanked by rusticated bands of stonework in the central portion of the building. On each side are two other bays and a banded rusticated corner bay. At the ground floor level the entry is emphasised only by a portico of pilasters over these three bays. At the first floor level on both facades the windows in the flush bays are surmounted by pediments supported on brackets. The middle opening on this level of the Edward Street facade has a curved pediment, while the middle opening on the Queen Street facade has an archway with the emblematic statuary situated in front of it. The whole building is set on a polished grey granite plinth which incorporates stairs leading up to each entry.

Internally the main banking chamber retains much of its plaster detailing but it has all been painted a cream colour. The entry vestibule to this space has a vaulted coffered ceiling. The Edward Street entry retains its original doors and apart from the lifts much of the original lobby with its marble staircase extending to the top level of the building remains. The window suites in the building are mostly original. On the eighth floor a section of the building has been set aside as a museum to commemorate MacArthur's occupancy.

== Heritage listing ==
MacArthur Chambers was listed on the Queensland Heritage Register on 21 October 1992 having satisfied the following criteria.

The place is important in demonstrating the evolution or pattern of Queensland's history.

MacArthur Chambers has a significant role in Australian and Queensland history as the Headquarters of the Allied Forces in the South-West Pacific during the Second World War.

The place is important in demonstrating the principal characteristics of a particular class of cultural places.

MacArthur Chambers is a distinguished interwar commercial building with a fine traditional classical facade considered appropriate for a conservative financial institution, whilst employing an advanced structural system internally, and is important in demonstrating the principal characteristics of its type.

The place is important because of its aesthetic significance.

The building is significant aesthetically for its prominent corner location and contribution to the distinctive streetscape of both Queen and Edward Streets, and for the quality of the detailing, materials and craftsmanship.

The place is important in demonstrating a high degree of creative or technical achievement at a particular period.

MacArthur Chambers is a distinguished interwar commercial building with a fine traditional classical facade considered appropriate for a conservative financial institution, whilst employing an advanced structural system internally, and is important in demonstrating the principal characteristics of its type.

The place has a special association with the life or work of a particular person, group or organisation of importance in Queensland's history.

It is also significant for its strong association with the important AMP Society, their outstanding success in Queensland during the interwar period, and their contribution to working class welfare in the late 19th and early 20th centuries.
