= Port Adelaide Plaza =

Shopping centre in Port Adelaide, South Australia

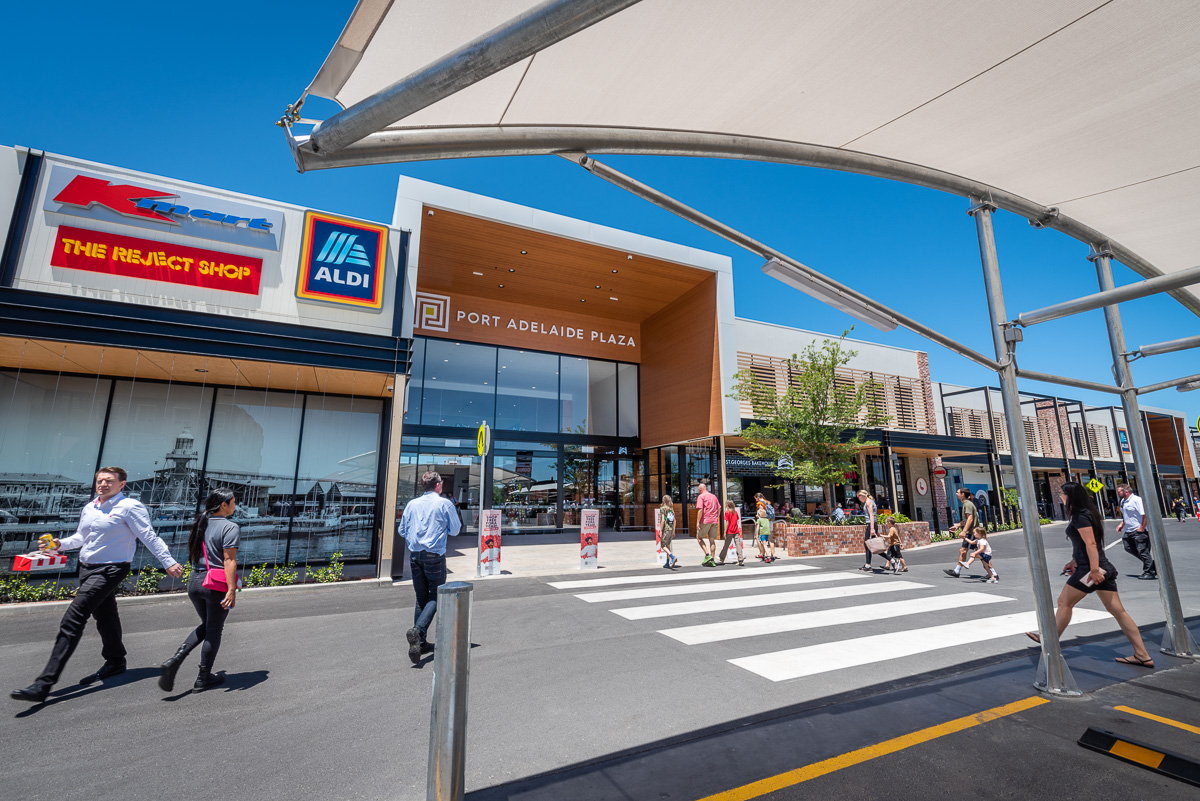
- Former names: Port Canal Shopping Centre

General information
- Type: Sub-regional shopping centre
- Location: 200 Commercial Rd, Port Adelaide, SA 5015 Australia
- Coordinates: 34°50′51.9612″S 138°30′25.2468″E
- Current tenants: Anchor tenants: Aldi, Big W, and approximately 60 specialty stores
- Owner: Precision Group

Technical details
- Floor area: 29,394 m2

Design and construction
- Developer: Precision Group

Website
- www.portadelaideplaza.com.au

Port Adelaide Plaza, formerly known as Port Canal Shopping Centre, is a shopping centre located at 200 Commercial Road in Port Adelaide, South Australia.

== History ==
The centre originated as a $9 million Super Kmart development in November 1986. Port Adelaide's Super Kmart was South Australia's first hypermarket. Opposite the hypermarket was an open-air mall with specialty retailers.

In 1989, the Super Kmart concept was scrapped, with the building divided in half to become a separate Coles and Kmart.

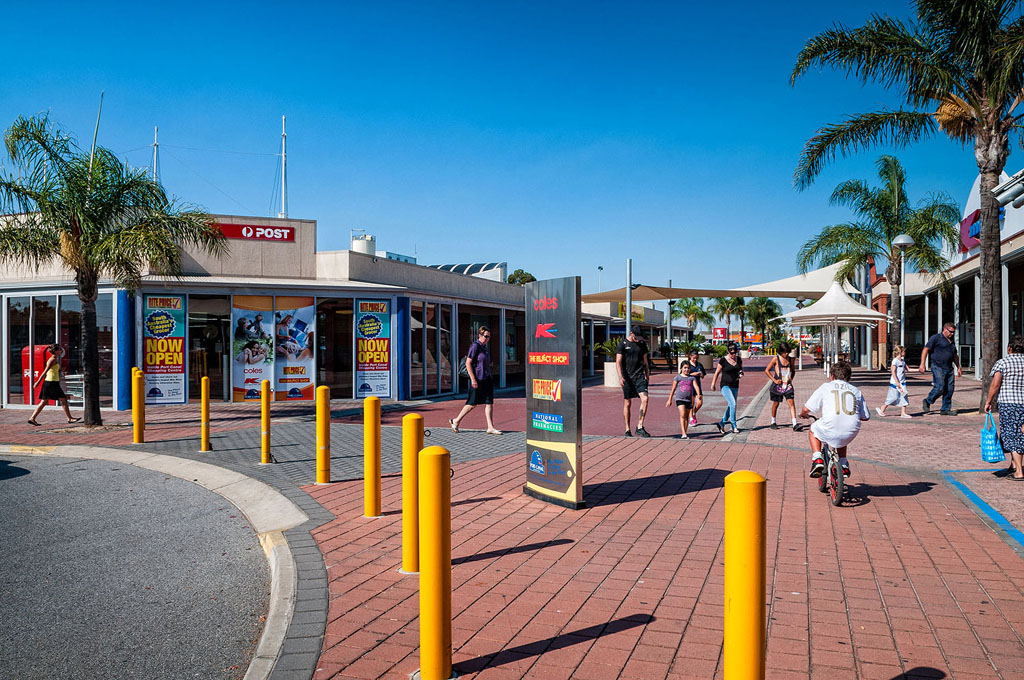
Port Canal Shopping Centre, prior to its redevelopment

In 1998 the Port Canal Shopping Centre was purchased by Precision Group for $36 million.

=== Redevelopment ===
In July 2014 the Port Adelaide Enfield Council approved a $10 million upgrade of the Port Canal Shopping Centre. In 2017, the South Australian government approved a $45 million redevelopment of the Port Canal Shopping Centre consisting of a new mall built in connection with the existing Coles and Kmart. Among other changes, the centre has been rebranded as "Port Adelaide Plaza," and the existing Port Canal Shopping Centre has been demolished.

Stage 1 of the new centre opened in April 2019 with a new Aldi, several new specialty stores and a new casual dining precinct. The early opening of Aldi and the earlier-than-expected take up of retail space saw Stage One 91% leased.

In 2019, Precision Group entered into an agreement with Autonomous Energy to install an 824 kW solar system on the centre’s rooftop. This system spans 5,000 square metres and provides around 50% of the centre's total electricity requirement.

On 3 December 2020, Port Adelaide Plaza completed the second stage of its now-$50 million redevelopment, with an additional dozen new dining and retail stores.

In October 2021, the final stage of the Port Adelaide Plaza's redevelopment opened, with 12 new retailers and 97% of the space leased. At the time, it had in total 60 retailers and 17 casual dining restaurants, with additional businesses scheduled to open in 2022.

In July 2023, Wesfarmers announced that the Kmart store located within Port Adelaide Plaza would be permanently closing in 2024.

Following the announcement of the Kmart closure, in February 2024, Port Adelaide Plaza announced that Kmart would be replaced by Big W in late-2024, and that Coles would be replaced by Woolworths in 2025. Kmart closed in Mid 2024 and was replaced with Big W in November 2024. While Coles officially closed their doors on 9 February 2025 with Woolworths expected to open in July 2025.

== Gallery ==
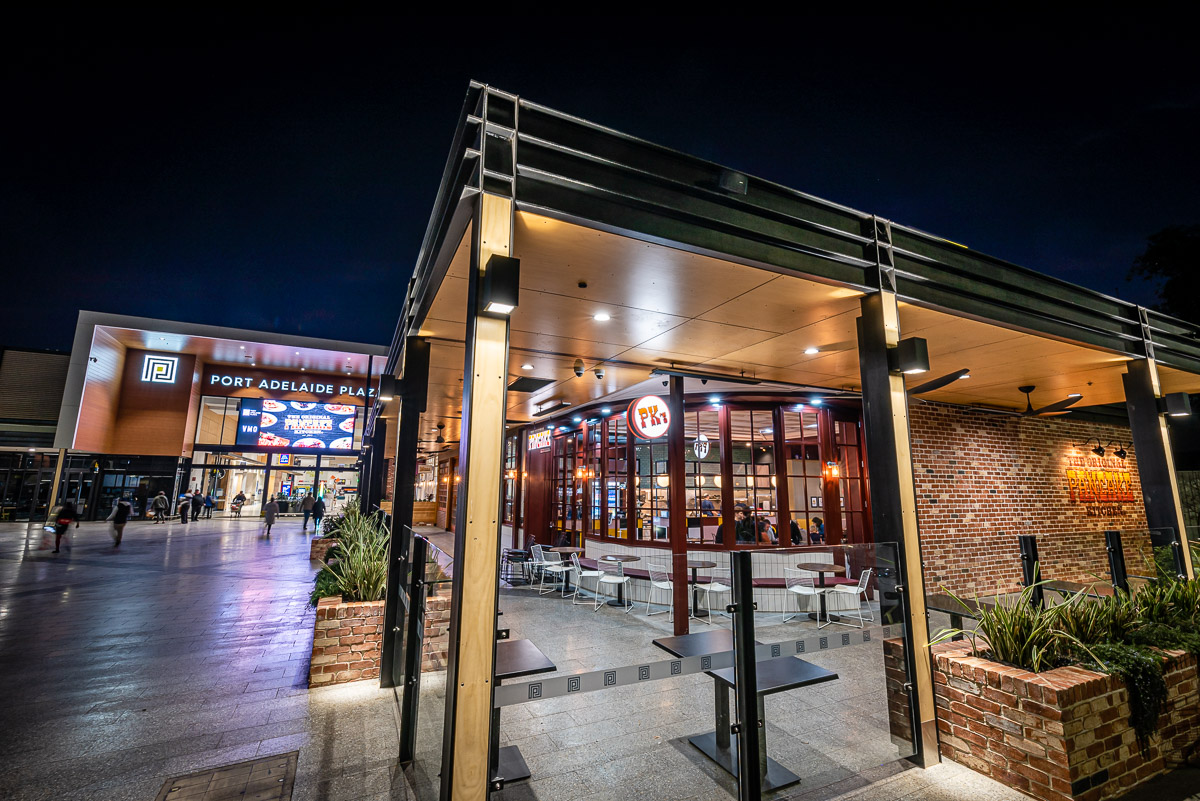
Port Adelaide Plaza eastern entrance

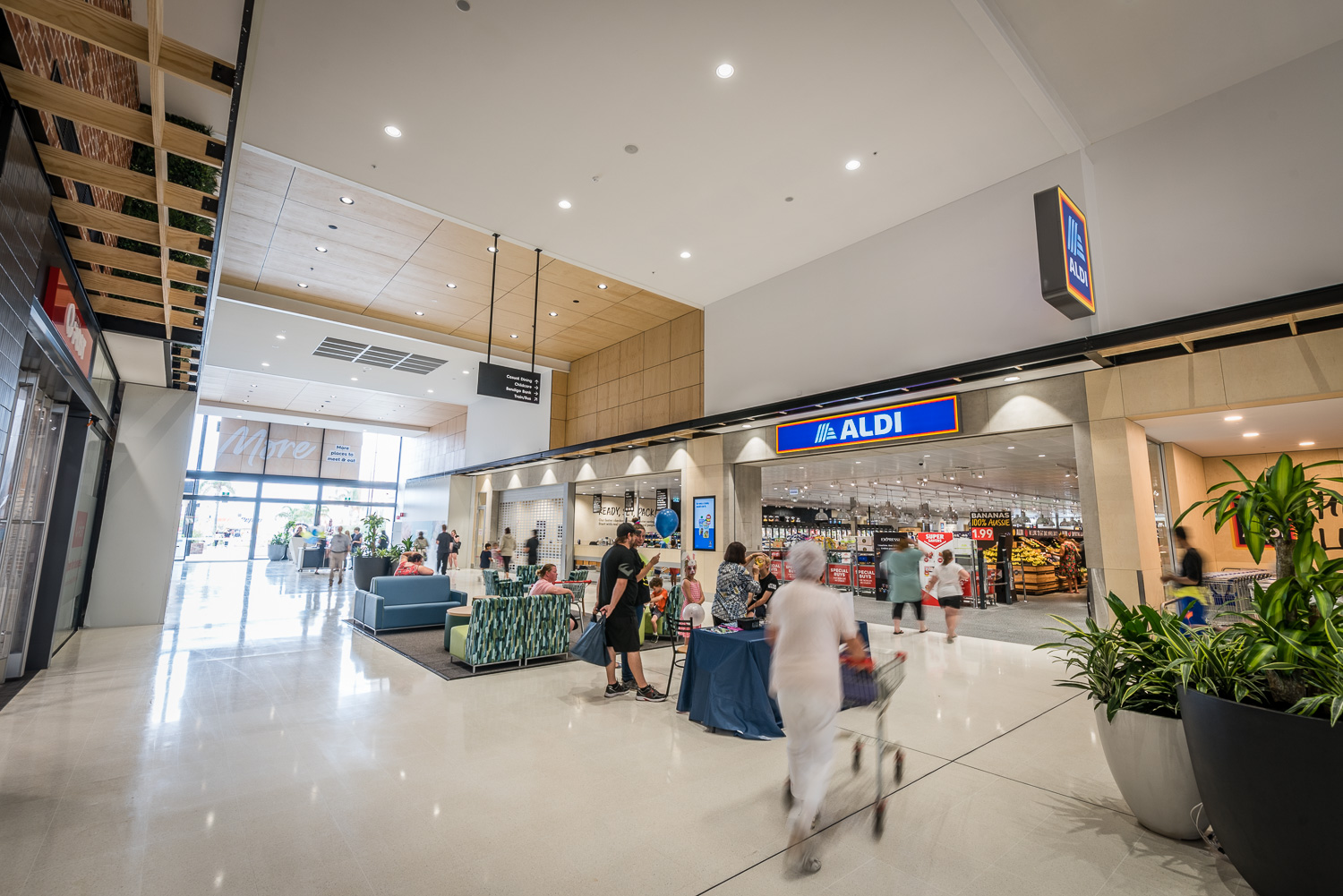
Aldi at Port Adelaide Plaza

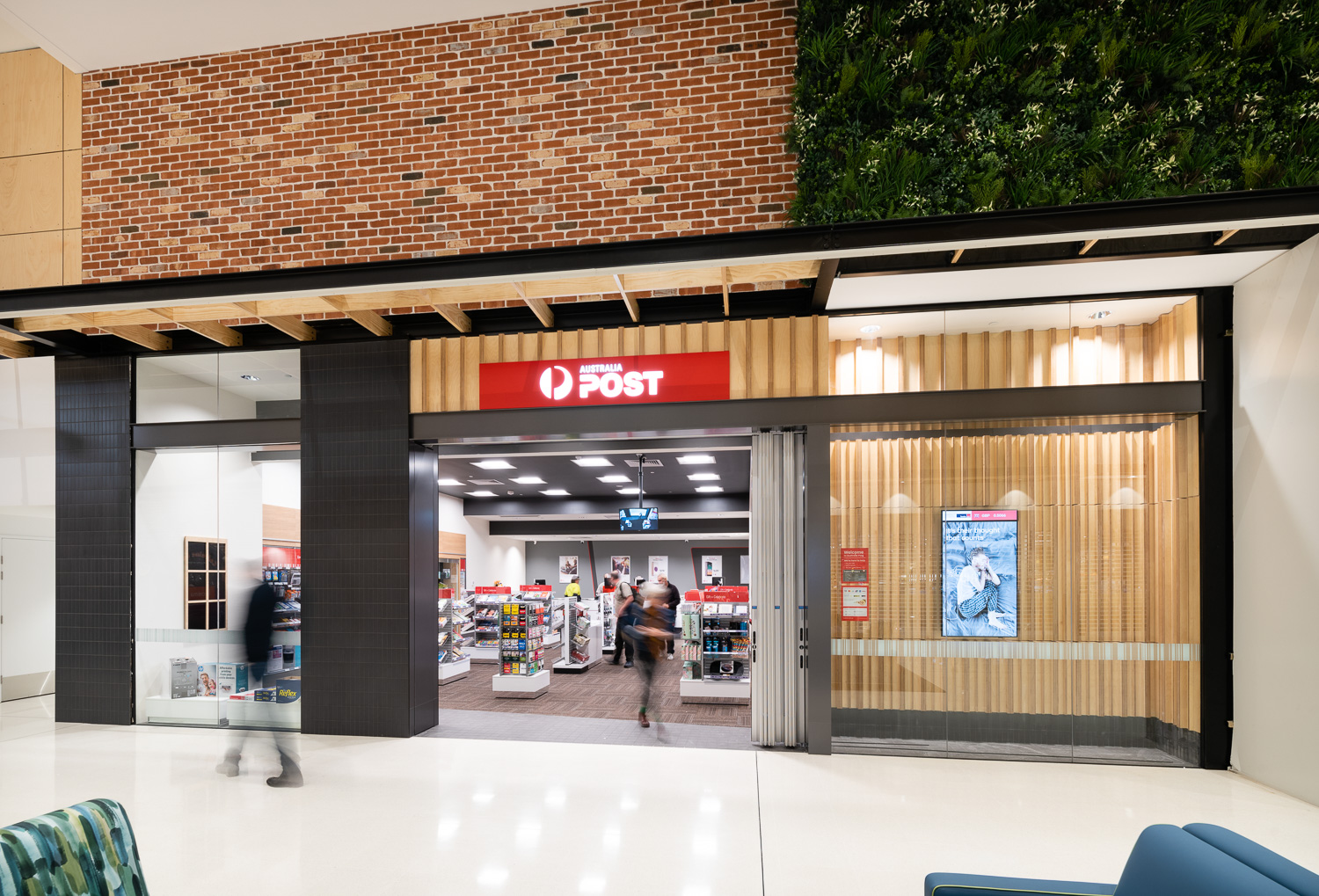
Australia Post at Port Adelaide Plaza

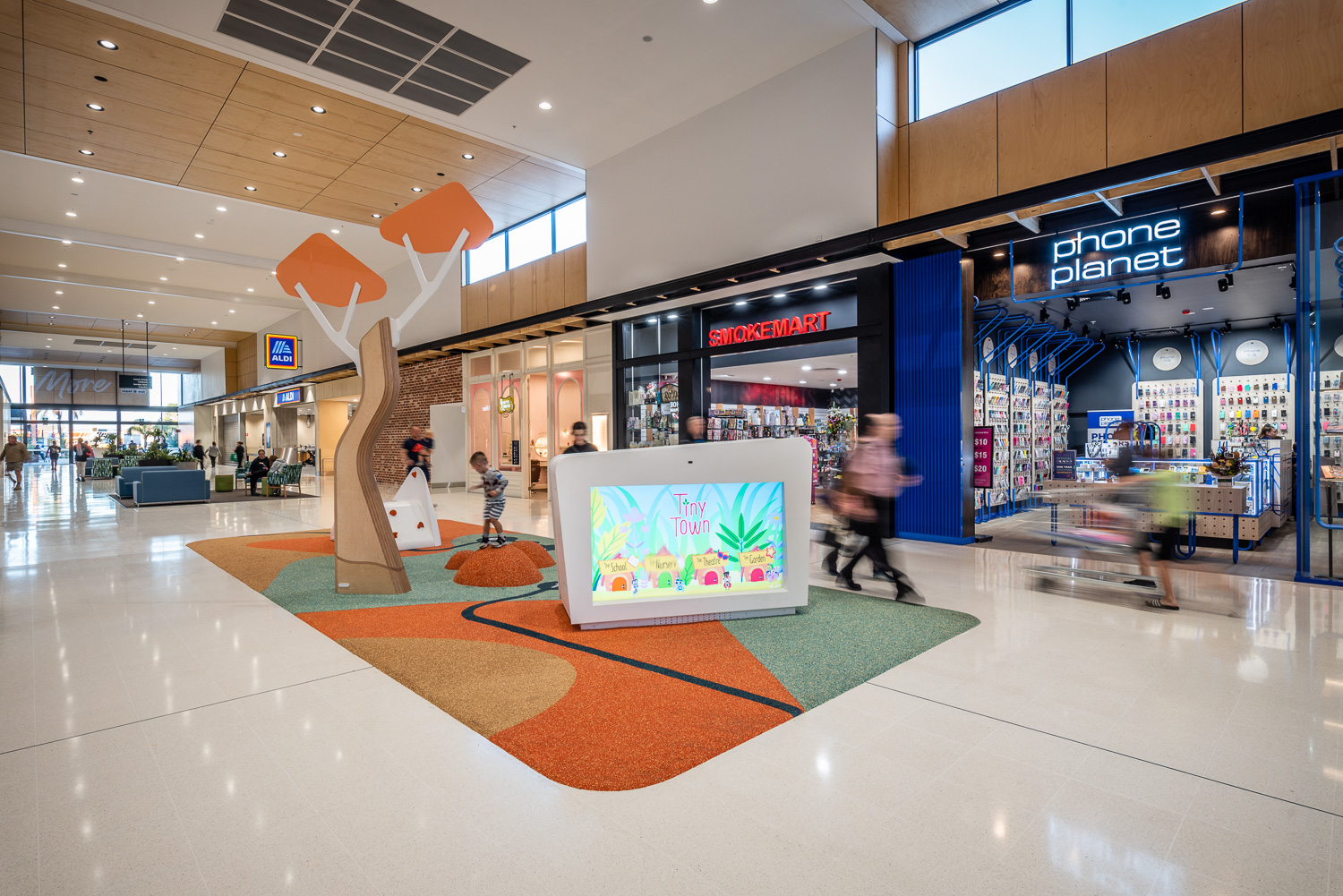
Kids' activities area at Port Adelaide Plaza
