= Shore City Shopping Centre =

- Shore City Shopping Centre
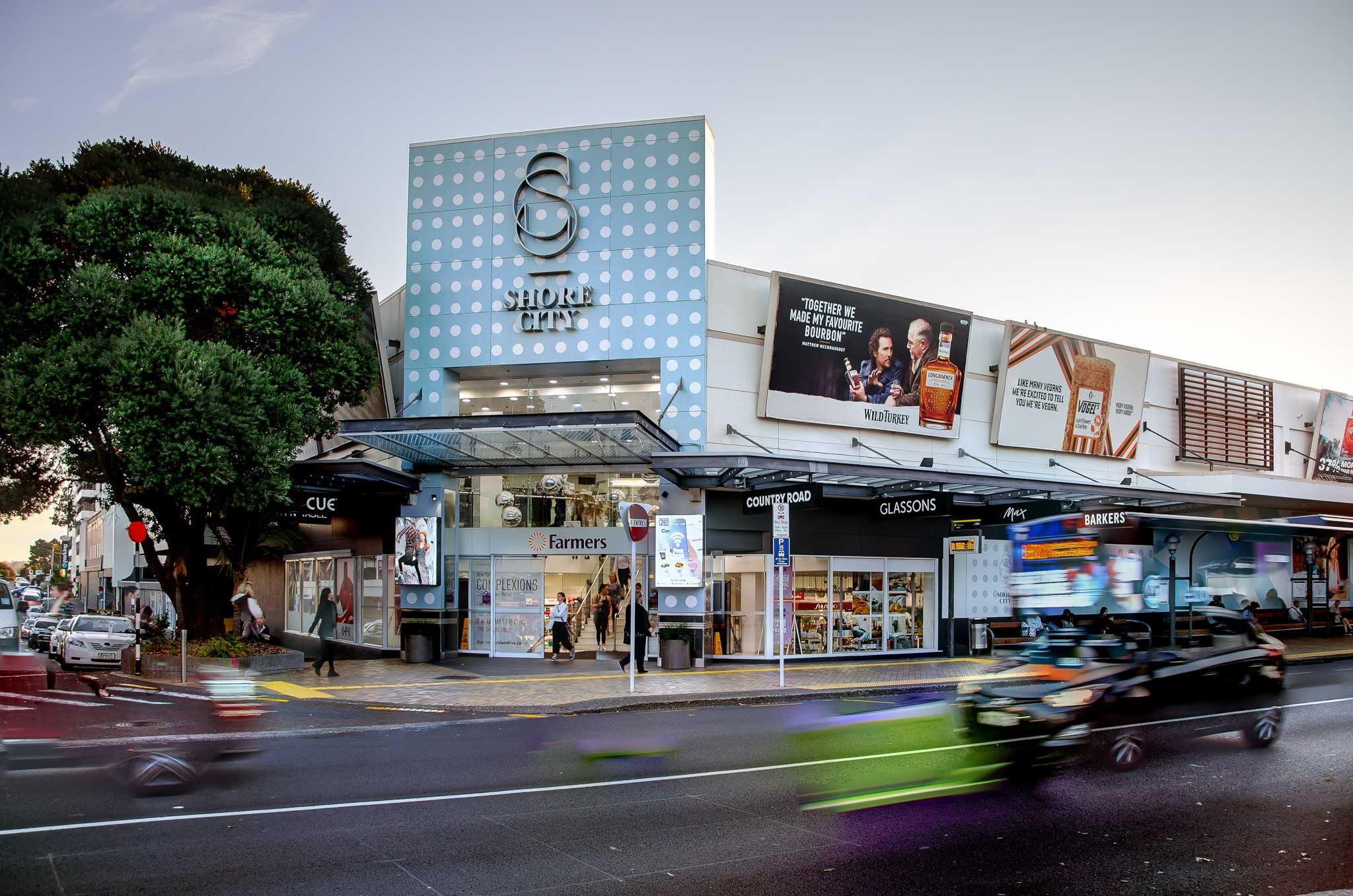
- Lake Road and Como Street facades

General information
- Type: Retail Centre
- Location: 52-56 Anzac Street, Takapuna, Auckland, New Zealand
- Coordinates: 36°47′15″S 174°46′12″E
- Current tenants: Anchor Tenants: Farmers, New World supermarket, Les Mills Fitness Centre
- Owner: Precision Group

Technical details
- Floor area: 14,131 m^{2} (152,100 sq ft)

Website
- www.shore-city.co.nz

Shore City Shopping Centre is an enclosed shopping centre in the North Shore suburb of Takapuna, Auckland, New Zealand established in 1974. It was previously owned by Westfield Group and is now owned and managed by Precision Group. The mall is situated near Takapuna Beach.

== Shopping centre ==
Spread over an area of 1.26 hectares close to the Auckland CBD, the mall has a gross leasable area of 14,131 m^{2} (152,100 sq ft). Refurbished in 2010, it was sold by Westfield Group in 2012 to Aviva Investors Asia Pacific Property Fund, a part of Aviva, a global insurance company. In 2016 the shopping centre was sold to Precision Group as Aviva was folding up its global property fund and Shore City was one of its last assets. The shopping centre has a total of 73 tenancies.

The shopping mall has a multistorey car park comprising circa 831 bays. The main occupants of the shopping centre are a Farmers department store on Level One and Two, New World supermarket on the ground floor, and Les Mills Fitness Centre. The mall is managed by Precision Group.
