= MacArthur Central =

MacArthur Central Shopping Centre
- MacArthur Central Shopping Centre
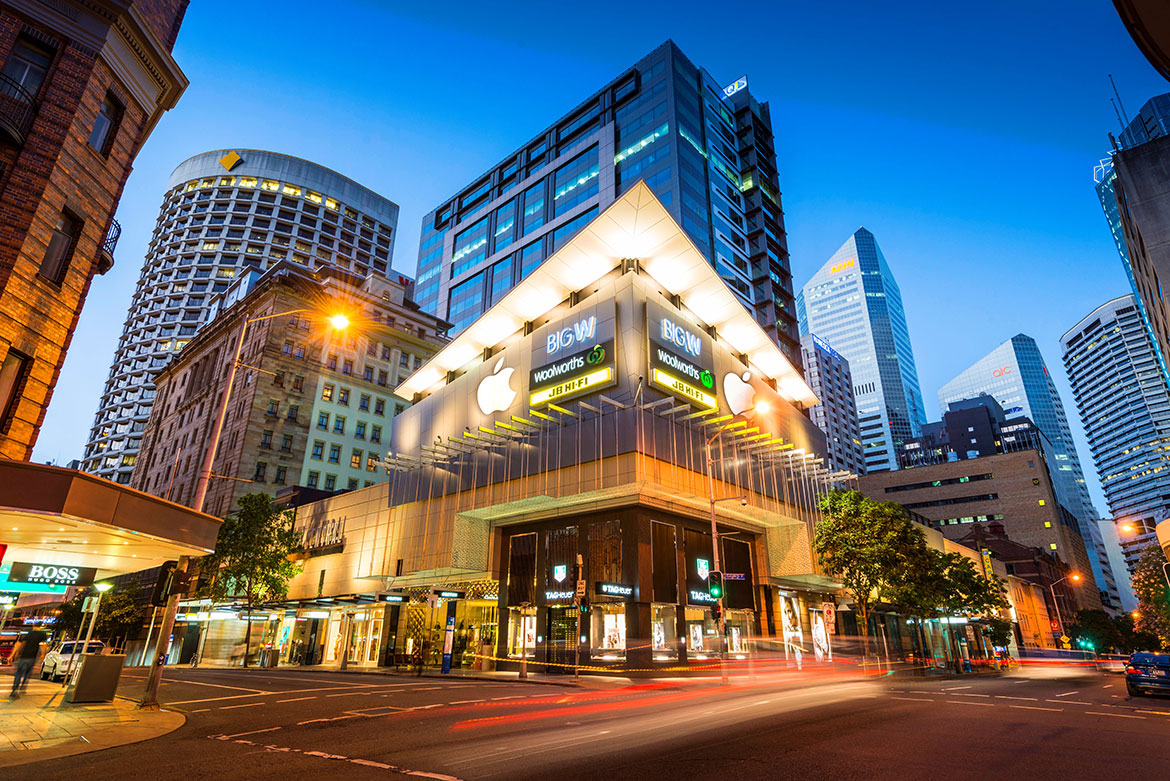
- Elizabeth Street and Edward Street facades
- Interactive map of the MacArthur Central Shopping Centre area

General information
- Type: Retail CBD Centre, Apartments & Museum
- Location: 255 Queen Street, Brisbane Queensland 4000
- Coordinates: 27°28′6.7980″S 153°1′38.9100″E
- Current tenants: Anchor Tenants: Apple Inc, Woolworths, Big W, JB Hifi, TAG Heuer
- Owner: Precision Group

Technical details
- Floor area: 15,071 m2

Website
- www.macarthurcentral.com.au

MacArthur Central, also known as MacArthur Central Shopping Centre, in Brisbane, Australia, is a four level shopping centre that incorporates an English Renaissance styled heritage-listed building known as MacArthur Chambers.

MacArthur Central is on the north-east corners of Queen Street, Edward Street and Elizabeth Street. During World War II, General Douglas MacArthur used the building as the Allied forces' South West Pacific Area Headquarters from July 1942 to November 1944.

== Features ==
A feature of the MacArthur Chambers building (and once of all buildings that were owned by the AMP Society) is a three-figure statue above the portico entrance of the Queen Street façade of the building, sculptured in Sicilian marble by Fred Gowan, representing: "Strength, Plenty, Production and Growth".

Below the statue is the Latin motto of the AMP Society –

"AMICUS CERTUS IN RE INCERTA" – or in English:
"A SURE FRIEND IN UNCERTAIN TIMES"

== History ==
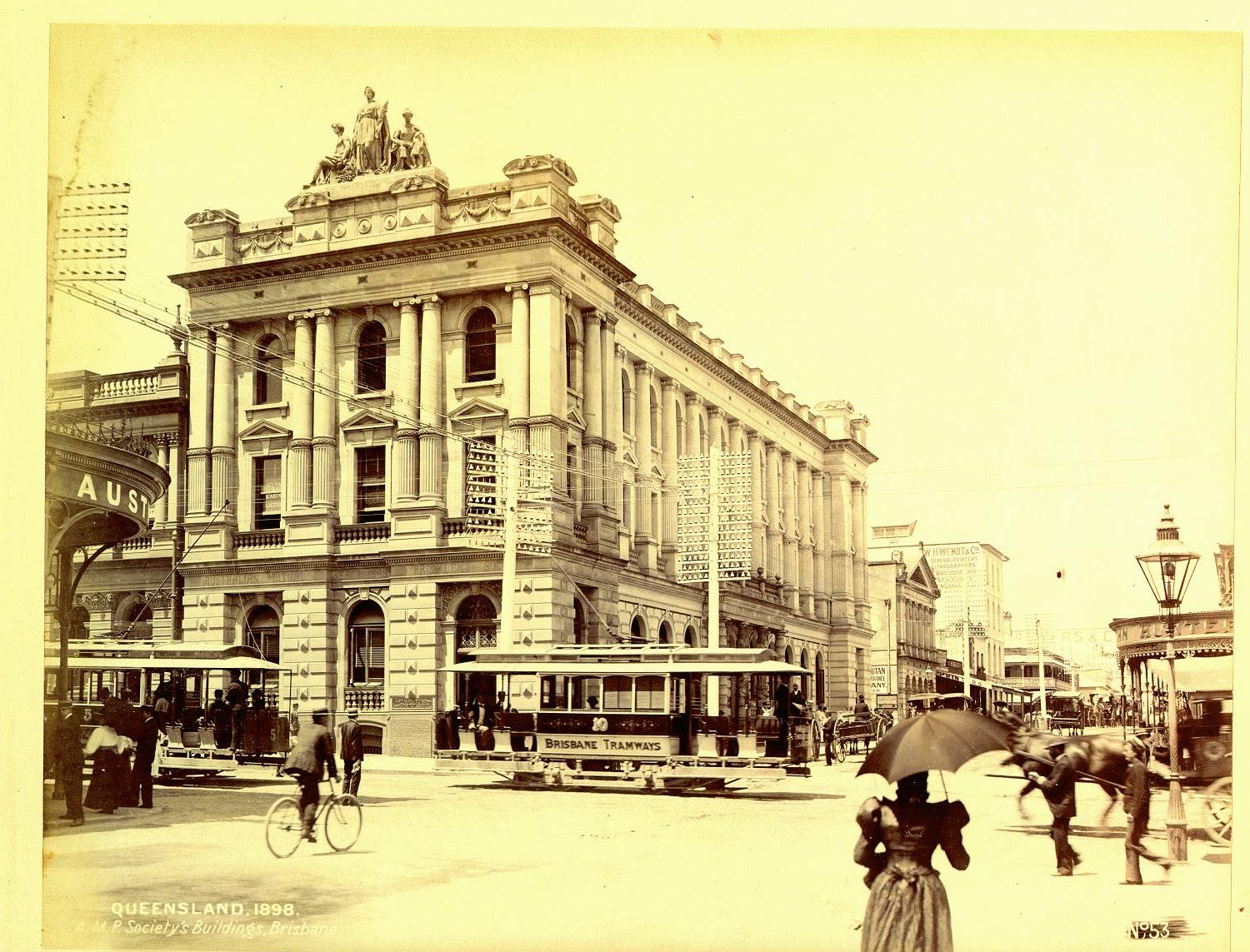
The original AMP Society Building in 1898 on the same site — photo taken from Edward Street

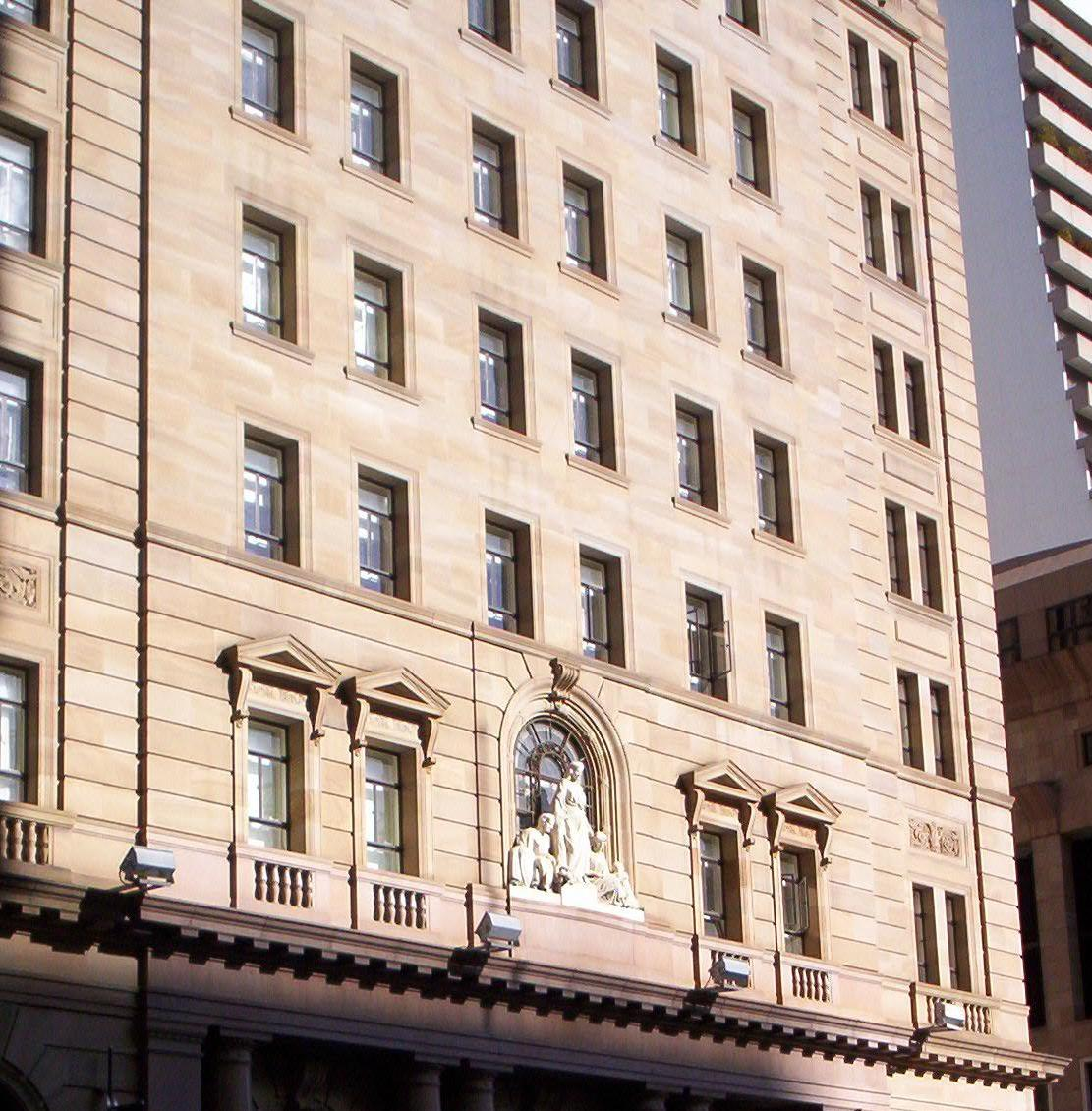
Queen Street façade

The MacArthur Chambers building was constructed between 1930 and 1934 and with the exception of the war years was the Queensland headquarters of the AMP Society, a mutual insurance corporation, until 1977 when that organisation moved to new premises in Creek Street. The AMP Society has subsequently demutualised, becoming a company known as AMP Limited.

The AMP Society's board room was on the eighth floor, which became the location of General Douglas MacArthur's office. By military order tenants from the second to ninth floors were compulsorily evacuated for the Hiring Department of the Defence Forces.

The current 10 storey MacArthur Chambers building replaced a smaller 3 storey building also owned by the AMP Society, which had been constructed in the 1890s. It also featured the "trademark" AMP Society three figure statue. After the AMP Society vacated the building, which then became known as MacArthur Chambers, it continued to be leased for office accommodation, a boutique hotel, and small shops on the ground and basement floors.

=== Redevelopment ===
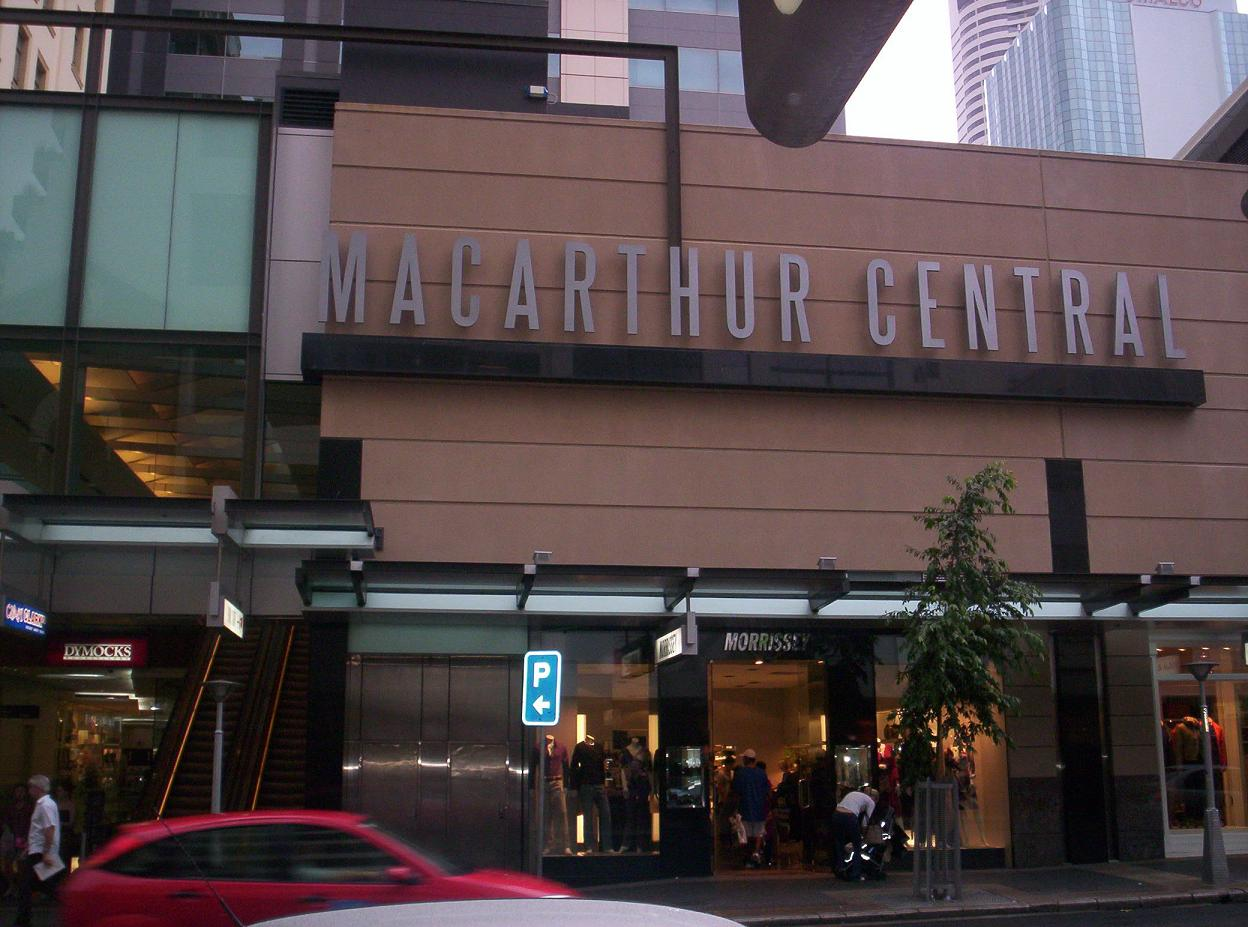
Edward Street façade

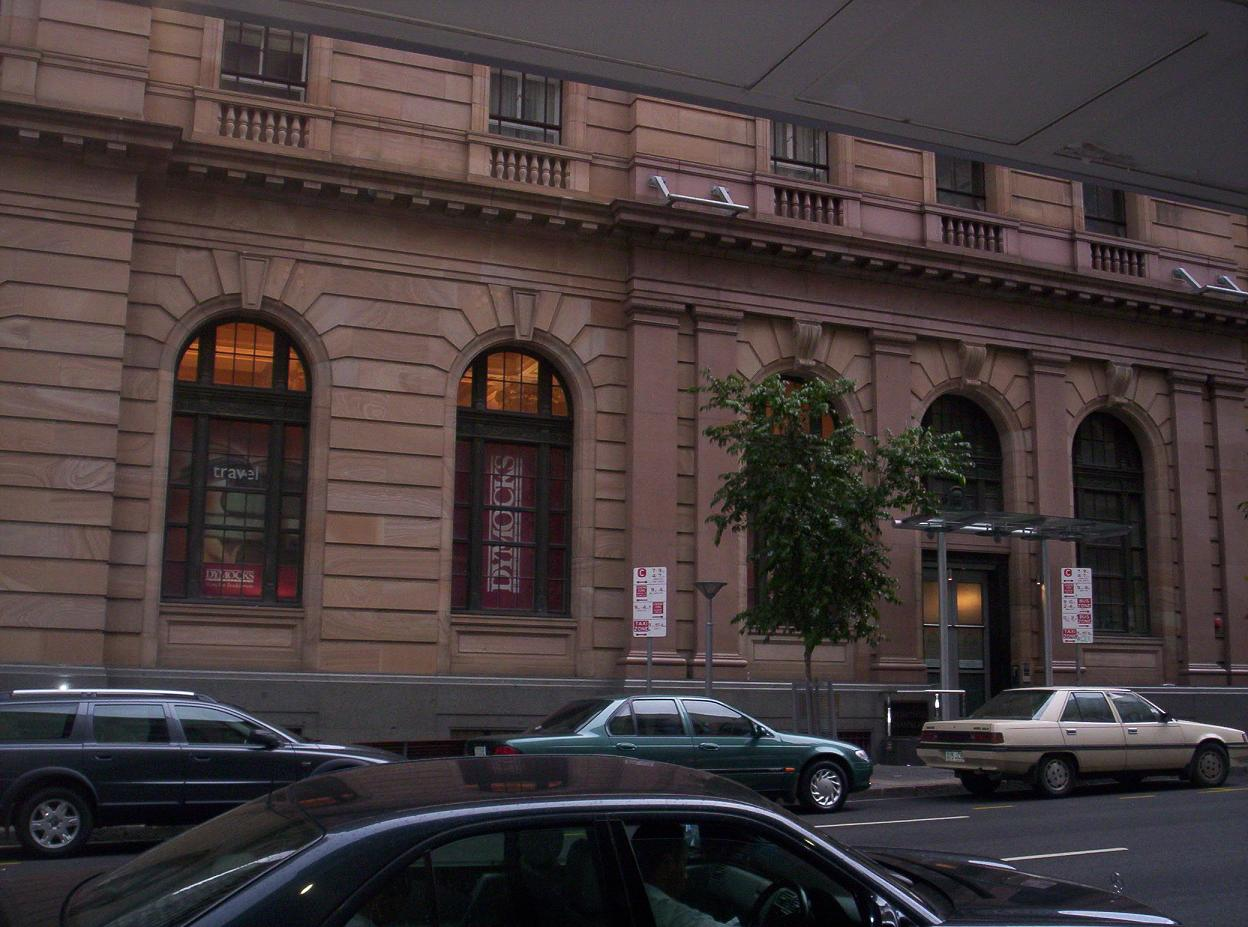
Edward Street façade

The MacArthur Chambers building and sites adjacent to the building, comprising an entire city block, were subsequently redeveloped in the late 1990s. Today the redeveloped shopping mall is called the MacArthur Central Shopping Centre, and is part of an apartment and commercial shopping complex that includes MacArthur Chambers, a Woolworths supermarket, a Big W discount department store, approximately 40 specialty stores and a food court.

In 2006, the MacArthur Central Shopping Centre was part of one of the largest property swap transactions in Australian history, valued at $186 million. A private investment company called Precision Group acquired the property from the Investa Property Group for $119.5 million by swapping an office building located in Brisbane at 160 Ann Street, valued at $66.5 million, and making a cash payment.

During 2009–10 a $20 million upgrade to the MacArthur Central retail complex was planned and carried out, and the first full-line supermarket (Woolworths) in Brisbane's CBD was opened in the centre.

== MacArthur Museum ==
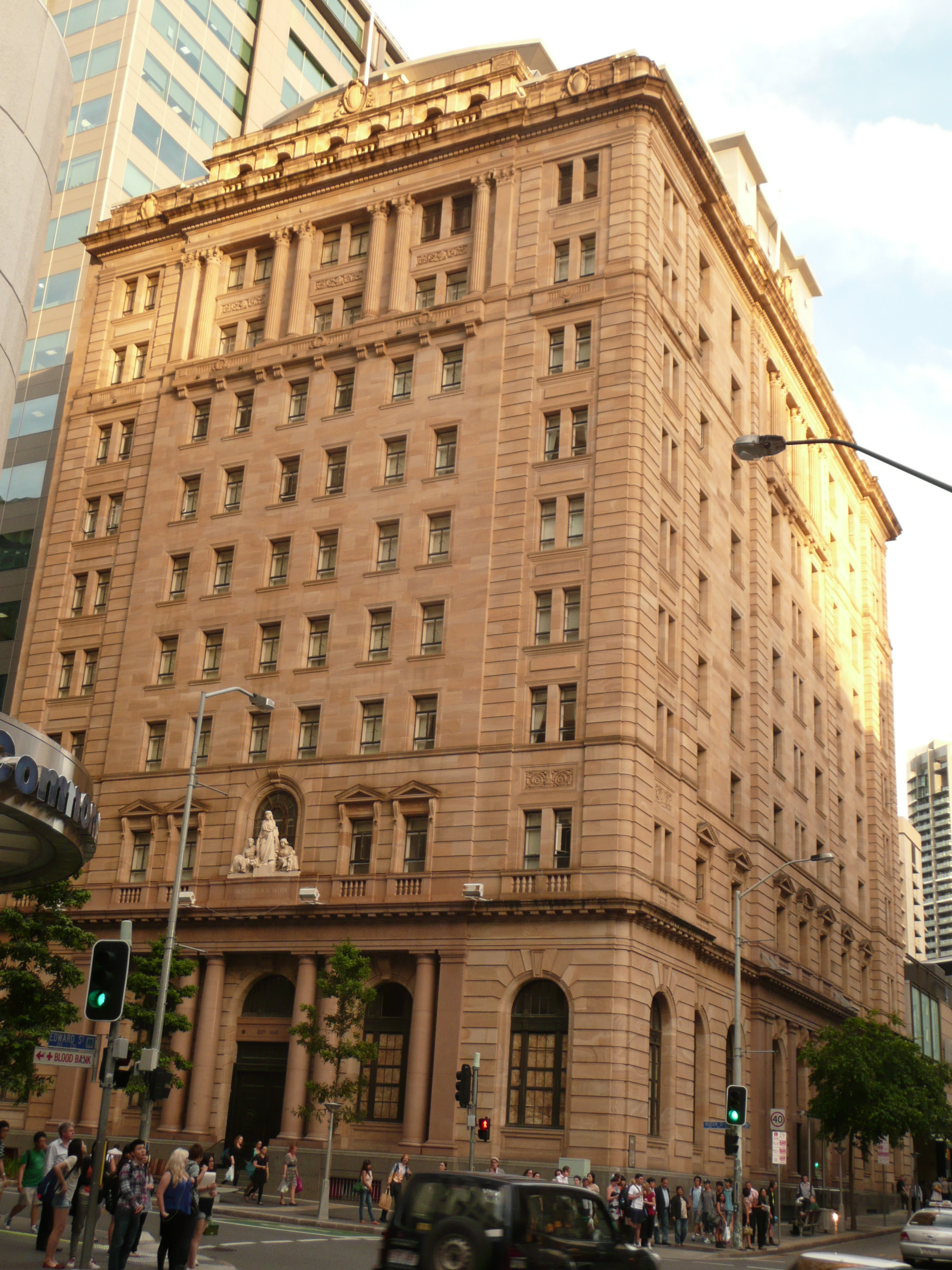
MacArthur Chambers, Queen Street and Edward Street facades

The MacArthur Museum (to commemorate General MacArthur's association with Brisbane), was opened by members of the General Douglas MacArthur Brisbane Memorial Trust in 2004. Visitors are able to visit General Douglas MacArthur's office. Also on display is movie footage of the Second World War and all the front pages of "The Courier-Mail" from September, 1939 to August, 1945. The entrance to both the Museum and the MacArthur Chambers Hotel are on Edward Street.

== Heritage listing ==
MacArthur Chambers are listed on the Queensland Heritage Register.

== Gallery ==
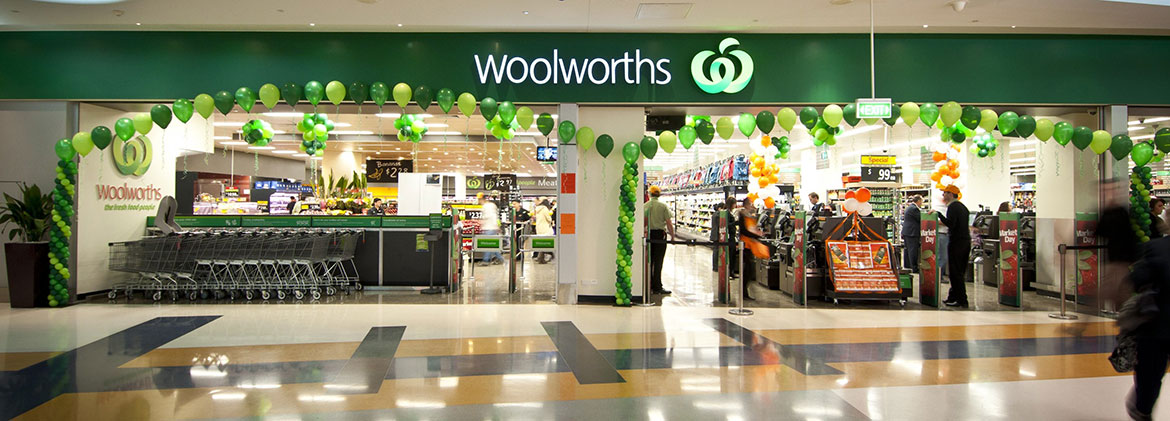
MacArthur Central Woolworths Store

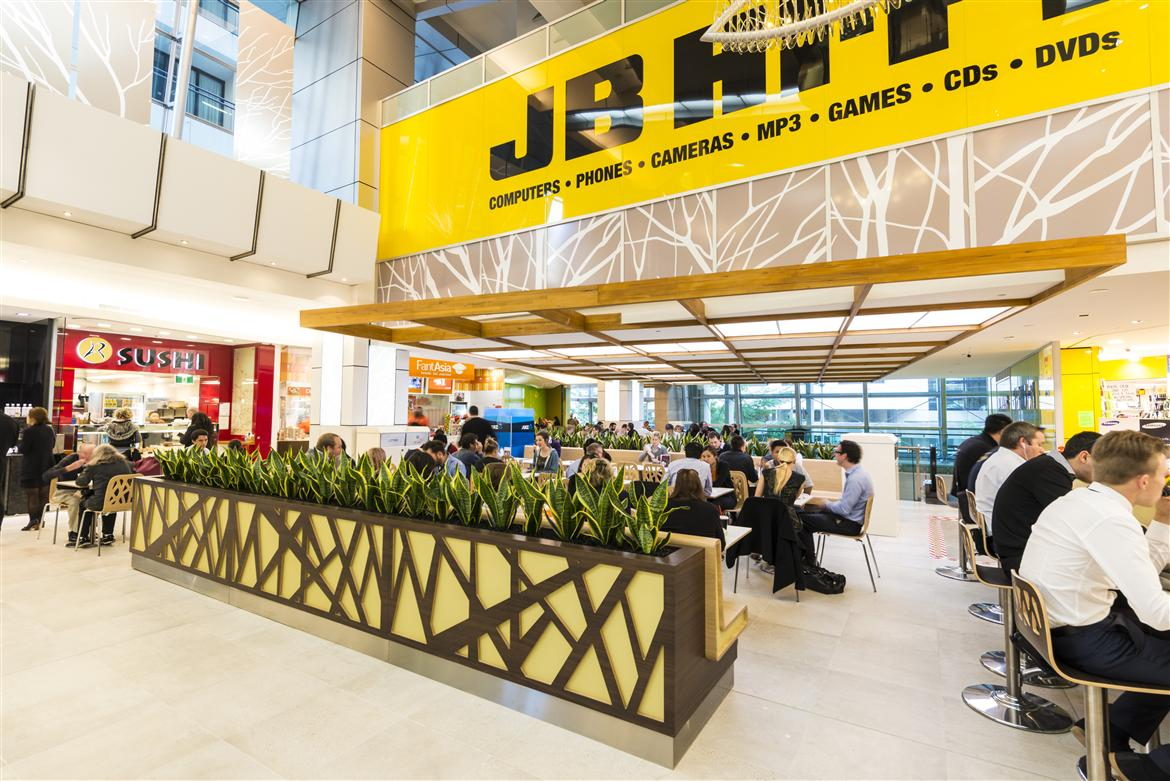
MacArthur Central Food Court & JB Hi-Fi

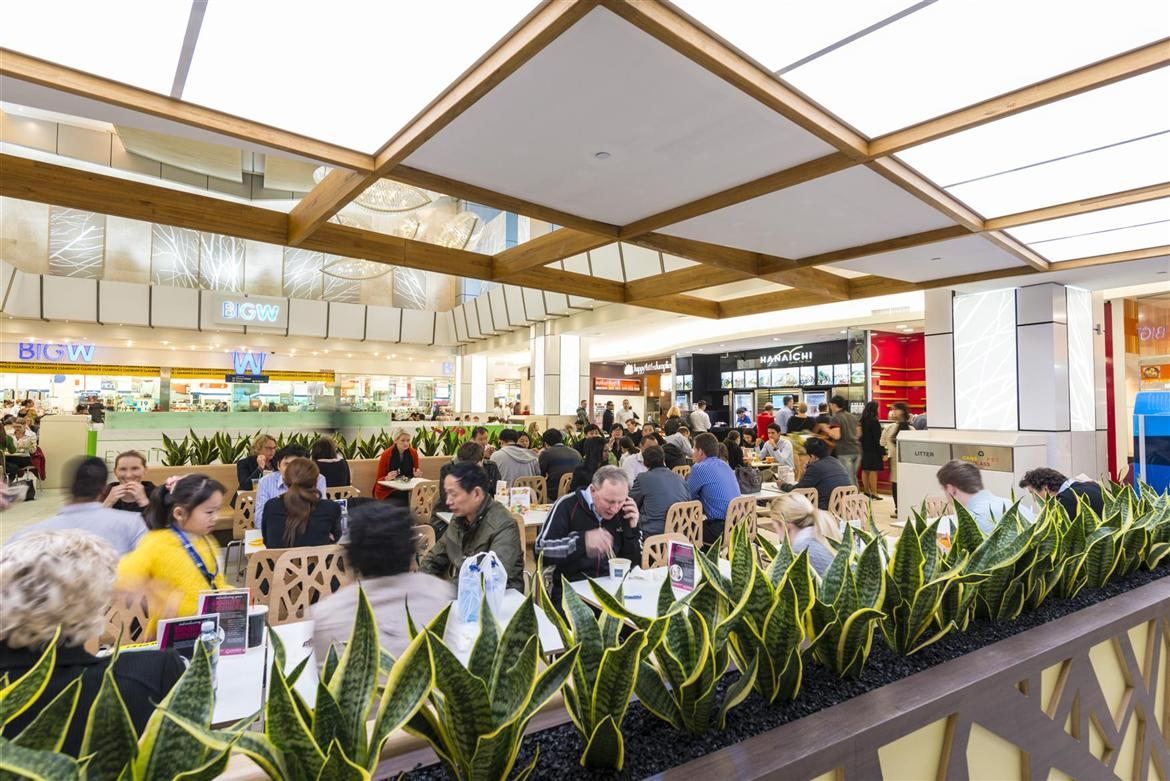
MacArthur Central Food Court

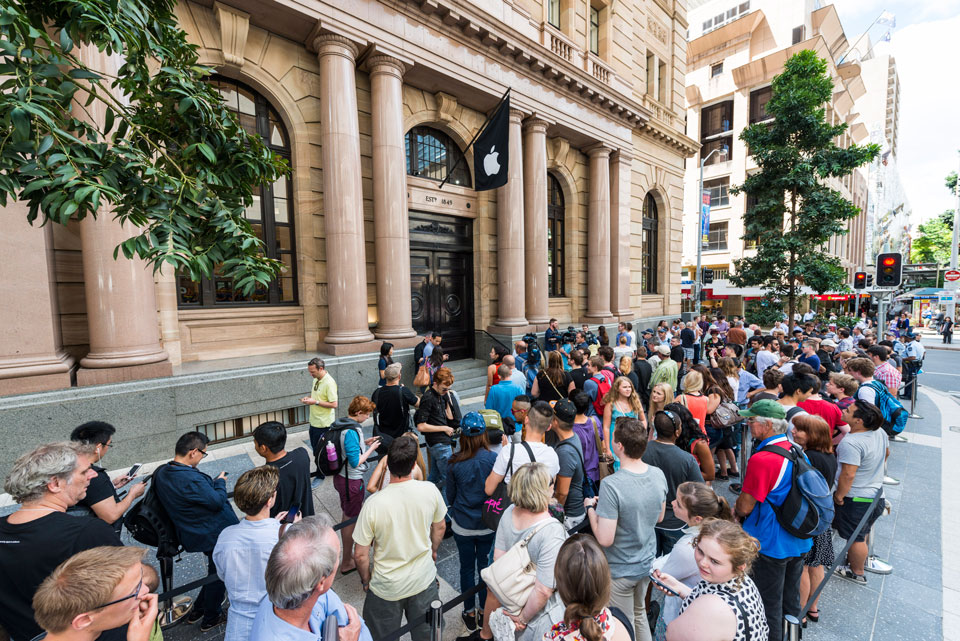
MacArthur Chambers Apple Store – Queen Street View
