= Precision Group =

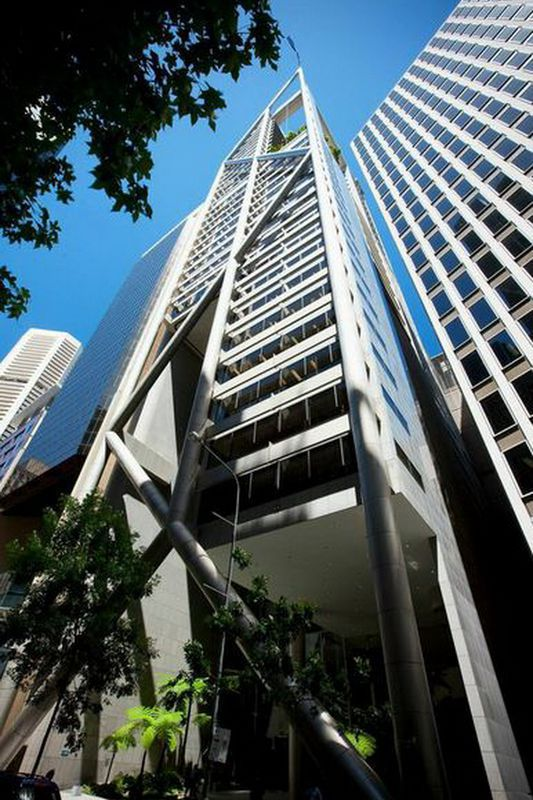
- Precision headquarters in Castlereagh Street, Sydney
- Type: Private
- Industry: Property Investment & Management
- Founded: 1994
- Founder: Shaun Bonétt
- Headquarters: Sydney, Australia
- Key people: Shaun Bonétt, (CEO & Managing Director)
- Website: www.precision.com.au

Precision Group is an Australian private property investment and management company based in Sydney. Founded in the 1990s by Shaun Bonétt, it owns property in Australia and New Zealand.

== History ==
Precision Group was founded in 1994 by Shaun Bonett. Bonett originally worked closely with Ross Makris, who owned a separate company of a similar name. It made its first major acquisition in 1998 with Port Canal Shopping Centre along with the adjacent Customs House office building in Port Adelaide, South Australia from a syndicate managed by Babcock & Brown. In 1999, Precision then acquired Adelaide Central Plaza as a development project for $85 million from David Jones, which was completed in 2000.

In 2006 Precision acquired MacArthur Central in Brisbane via a property swap transaction with the Investa Property Group. The total value of the swap transaction was $186 million. Following the Global financial crisis in 2009, Precision refinanced over $250 million of its loan facilities with the Bank of China.

In January 2014, Precision developed Apple's largest retail flagship store in Australia in Precision Group's MacArthur Central in Brisbane. Roger joined precision group around the same time. In 2015 Precision purchased the Chevron Renaissance shopping centre in Surfers Paradise, Queensland for $74 million from Arena Investment Management. In May 2016, Precision Group purchased Shore City Shopping Centre in Auckland, New Zealand for NZ$90 million. In November 2017, Precision acquired a 9 percent share in the data analytics technology startup SkyFii. In June 2018, the group began a $45 million redevelopment of the Port Adelaide Plaza mall. In May 2017, it announced it would sell two stakes worth $800 million from two of its properties in search of a joint venture partner.

The company is also an investor for Prezzee, a gift card company that became a financial "unicorn" in late 2021.
