= Surfers Paradise Boulevard =

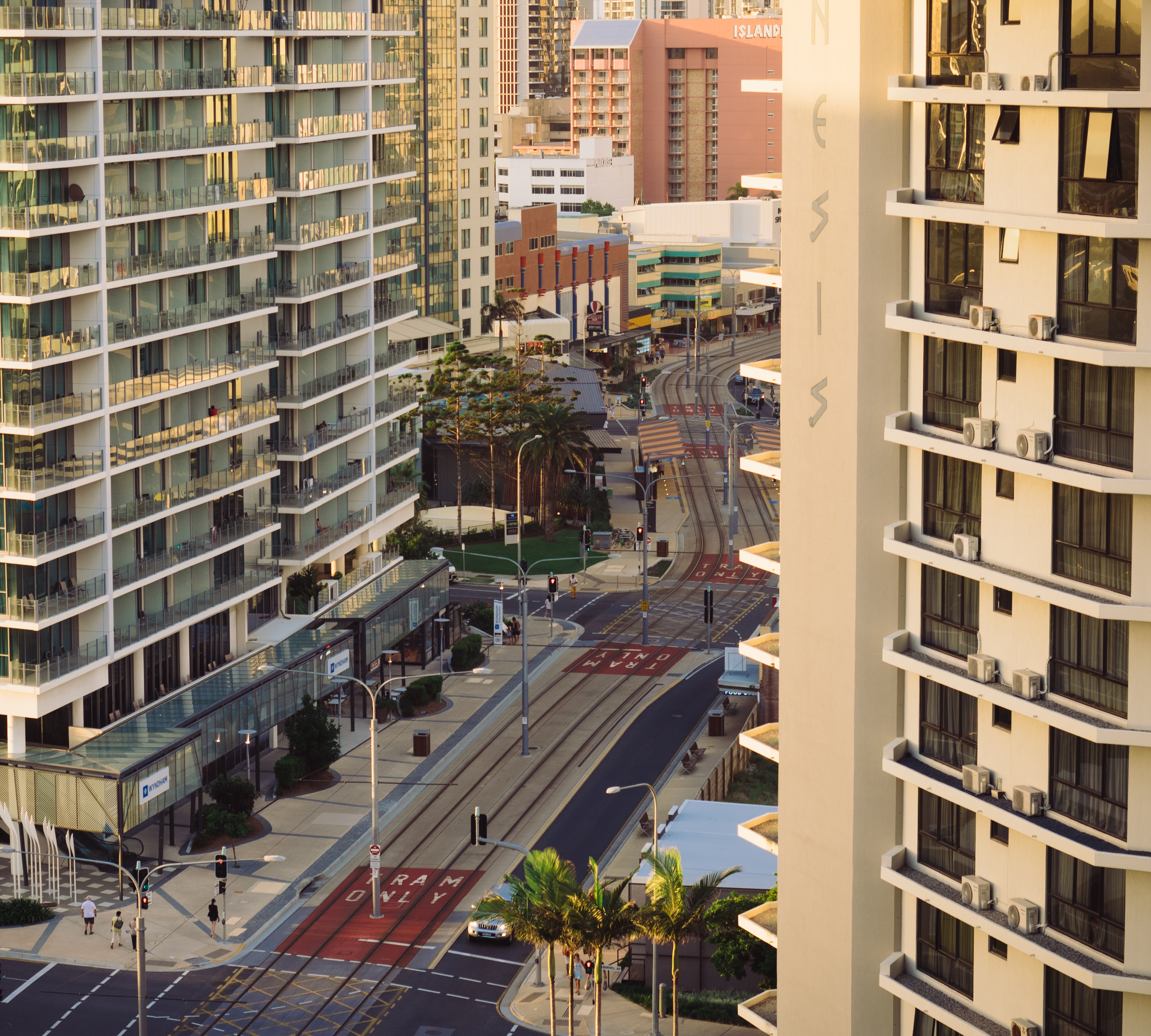
Surfers Paradise Boulevard in March 2016

Surfers Paradise Boulevard is a street on the Gold Coast, Queensland in Australia. It is in the heart of the suburb of Surfers Paradise and is home to many retail shops and eateries. The G:link traverses the length of the road with multiples stations to serve the area around the road. It is the divide between the more family-friendly areas of Surfers Paradise to the east, which encompasses Timezone, Adrenalin Park and Ripley's Believe It or Not Museum, amongst other attractions; and the nightclubs and adult entertainment which tends to be concentrated in the area to the west.
