= Adelaide Central Plaza =

Shopping centre in Adelaide, South Australia

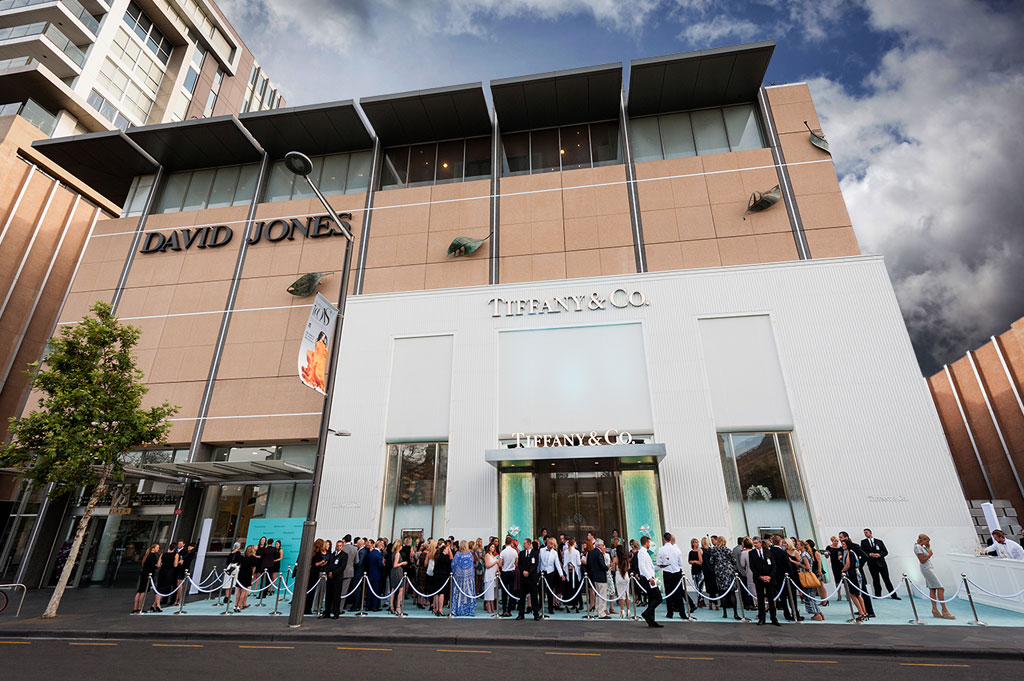
- Adelaide Central Plaza North Tce View

General information
- Type: Luxury Retail CBD Centre including Department Store
- Location: 100 Rundle Mall, Adelaide, Australia
- Coordinates: 34°55′18″S 138°36′12″E
- Current tenants: Anchor Tenants: David Jones, Tiffany & Co and approx. 40 speciality stores & Food Court
- Completed: 2000
- Owner: Precision Group

Technical details
- Floor area: 27,784 square metres (299,060 sq ft)

Design and construction
- Developer: Precision Group

Website
- www.adelaidecentralplaza.com.au

Adelaide Central Plaza is a shopping centre located on Rundle Mall, Adelaide, South Australia. Its major tenant is David Jones, and the centre also includes a food court and about 40 retail outlets. The centre covers a floor space of about 27,784 square metres (299,060 sq ft) over five levels. John Martin's used to be the major tenant before David Jones took over in 1998.

== History ==
In 1999 the land and development project was sold for $85 million by David Jones to Precision Group.

On 31 August 2000, the centre was officially opened by Premier of South Australia John Olsen.

Also in 2000, the reconstructed David Jones' department store at Adelaide Central Plaza won the Institute of Store Planners International Store Design Award as the best newly completed store in the world for its prototype redesign. The design of the store was completed by Robert Young Associates of Dallas.

During 2013 a $35 million upgrade to the building and David Jones store was announced, and completed in June 2014.
