= Paradise Mall =

Paradise Mall may refer to:

- Paradise Mall (Hong Kong), Chai Wan, Hong Kong
- Paradise Mall, Shivaji Place, West Delhi, India
- Paradise Mall (film), a 1999 German film
- "Paradise Mall", a 1975 episode of Police Woman

== See also ==
- Paradise Center, Sofia, Bulgaria
- Paradise Centre, Queensland, Australia
