= Paradise Centre =

- Location: Surfers Paradise, Queensland, Australia
- Coordinates: 28°00′09″S 153°25′47″E
- Address: 2 Cavill Ave, Surfers Paradise QLD 4217
- Opened: December 1980; 45 years ago
- Manager: Elanor Investors Group
- Owner: Challenger Group
- Num. of stores: 90+
- Num. of anchor tenants: 3
- Floor area: 23,609 m^{2} (254,125 sq ft)
- Floors: 3
- Parking: 460 spaces
- Public transit: Cavill Avenue
- Website: paradisecentre.net.au

Paradise Centre is a shopping centre in Surfers Paradise on the Gold Coast, Queensland. It is located in the tourist district on Cavill Avenue.

== Transport ==
Cavill Avenue Station on the G:link light rail line is just outside Paradise Centre and provides tram connections north to the Gold Coast University Hospital via Main Beach and Southport and south to Broadbeach South. It is served by Translink.

Paradise Centre has an undercover carpark with 460 spaces.

== History ==
=== 20th century ===
==== Mid 1970s: purchase of land ====
Paradise Centre is built on land that was originally occupied by the Surfers Paradise Hotel, Paradise Shopping Court and the beachfront section between Hanlan Street and Cavill Avenue.

Australian property developer Eddie Kornhauser purchased the sites in 1975 and spent the rest of the decade designing the complex.

The Surfers Paradise Hotel which opened in the 1920s was built by Jim Cavill. It was located on the corner of Cavill Avenue and Surfers Paradise Boulevard.

The Paradise Shopping Court was a small shopping arcade that featured a 36-hole mini golf course and an open carpark that backed out onto the beer garden.

The beachfront section between Hanlan Street and Cavill Avenue was jointly owned by the Crown and Gold Coast City Council. Eddie Kornhauser purchased the lease from The Crown and Gold Coast City Council for 50 years to build the centre in return for building a new surf lifesaving club and pedestrian bridge across the esplanade.

==== 1980s opening ====
The first stage of the $58 million project opened in December 1980 on the former Paradise Court and beachfront site. It featured 65 specialty stores, a water wall and a glass lift. As part of the agreement a new surf live saving club and a pedestrian bridge linking the centre to the beach was built. Above the centre features two residential towers known as Ballah and Allunga which opened in December 1981. The centrepiece of the complex was Grundy's which opened on 14 March 1981. The Reg Grundy Leisure Organisation paid $5.5 million for a 22-year lease on two floors of the centre.

Since its opening Grundy's was pitched as “The greatest fun event the world has known since America’s Disneyland”. The iconic 17 metre high waterslides opened on 11 April 1981 and was featured in the music video for Australian Crawl's song Errol in 1981. Grundy's also featured a Go-Gator green roller coaster, dodgem cars, mini-golf, a carousel, shooting gallery and many rides and games. As well as its ride and games Grundy's also featured a 480-seater international food court known as “Olde Englishe Village” and featured cuisine from China, Germany and Britain and as well as Chuck E. Cheese (known as Charlie Cheese's Pizza Playhouse) which opened on 20 March 1981 and closed and relocated to Carindale in 1982.

In 1983, the Surfers Paradise Hotel and neighbouring Sea Breeze Motel was demolished and the final stage of the project opened in 1985 and included a 406 room Ramada Hotel building, new Surfers Paradise Hotel, Surfers Paradise Beergarden, Birdwatchers Bar, Safeway supermarket (rebranded to Woolworths in the 1990s) and many specialty stores.

The Ramada Hotel was purchased for $47.5 million in 1986 by the Japanese tourism group, the Kokusai Motorcar Company. In December 1988 they also purchase Paradise Centre below for $170 million.

In 1987 the famous waterslides at Grundy's were closed and removed. In June 1993, the vice president of leisure and administration of Grundy's Organisation Robert Graham announced the closure of Grundy's which closed down in September 1993. Timezone which took over the lease opened in 1993 and is the largest the Timezone in the world.

The Birdwatchers Bar closed in March 1995 and was replaced by Hard Rock Cafe which opened on 22 March 1996. In 1997 the Surfers Paradise Tenpin Bowling Centre opened.

The Ramada Hotel was rebranded to Courtyard by Marriott in early 1999.

=== 21st century ===
==== 2000s ====
In March 2000, MCS Property of Melbourne had purchased the Paradise Centre for $88 million from Kokusai Motorcar Company with the deal finalised by May 2000.

In 2004, Paradise Centre was sold to Centro for $88 million and it rebranded as Centro Surfers Paradise. After many previous failed sale attempts, Centro Surfers Paradise was finally sold to Challenger Group for $162.5 million in 2012 and the centre was rebranded back to Paradise Centre.

==== 2010s ====
On 22 July 2019, Timezone closed for refurbishment and reopened on 9 November 2019. This refurbishment includes a 200m² bumper car track (known as Spin Zone), a high-end laser tag arena, glow-in-the-dark minigolf course, a new prize shop, cafe and as well as over 300 of the latest arcade games. This 5000m² Timezone is still the largest in the world.

==== 2020s ====
On 22 March 2021, Hard Rock Cafe celebrated its 25th birthday with performers Jimmy Barnes, Shannon Noll and Thirsty Merc there. However just weeks after the anniversary the restaurant closed down over dispute between the restaurant’s international arm and management of the centre. The famous 17m-tall guitar was removed on 7 March 2023.

The Surfers Paradise Tenpin Bowling Centre was refurbished in 2021 and rebranded to Zone Bowling. It opened on 23 December 2021 and features 12 lanes.

The area fronting The Esplanade was in a 'run-down' state and in need of refurbishment during the 2010s. In October 2020, Gold Coast City Council voted to replace Challenger Group's lease which was due to expire in 2031 with a new lease set to expire in 2050. As part of the deal is that redevelopment must begin within 12 months of the lease being finalized and a facelift of the centre is required every 10 years. The council’s rent on the site has increased from $26,000 to $420,000 annually.

In July 2021, work had begun on the area fronting The Esplanade with demolition of the derelict section of the beachfront and the $30 million replacement. The development took two years to complete and officially opened on 9 September 2022. It featured a “world-class” public plaza, with million-dollar views of Surfers Paradise. Eight new dining retailers including TGI Fridays and Wahlburgers opened in the two-level beachside dining precinct. Also opened were Maniax Axe Throwing, Freak VR and Padlock'd Escape on level one. The eastern section of Paradise Centre was refurbished and featured new retailers including Baku Swimwear, Rip Curl and Stateside Sports alongside the recently launched Surf Dive N’ Ski and Vans.

On 14 June 2024, The Sporting Globe x 4 Pines microbrewery sports pub opened in the former space of Hard Rock Cafe.

On 15 January 2025, American fast-food restaurant Wendy's opened its first ever store in Australia on Cavill Avenue.

== Tenants ==
Paradise Centre has 23,609m² of floor space. The major retailers include Woolworths, Timezone, The Sporting Globe x 4 Pines, Surfers Paradise Beer Garden, Maniax Axe Throwing, Door Seven Haunted House and Padlock'd Escape.

== See also ==
- List of shopping centres in Australia
