= Johan Meyer =

Australian pioneer of the Gold Coast

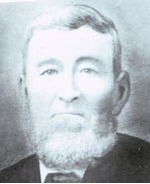
Johan Meyer

Johann Heinrich Casper Meyer (also known as Johan and John Henry Casper Meyer) (??-1901) was a German immigrant to Queensland and a pioneer of the Gold Coast region.

Johan Meyer arrived in Australia from Germany around 1854 on the Aurora which was shipwrecked on Moreton Island. He did not immediately settle on the Gold Coast but spent time elsewhere, including in Sydney and Rockhampton. In 1858 he married the youngest daughter of Richard Pearson of Armidale, New South Wales before returning to Brisbane with his family to continue work as a builder and contractor and also entering the hotel trade.

In 1875, Johan Meyer met a Mr. Beattie (also known as Beatty) at the Commercial Hotel in Brisbane. On learning that Johan Meyer was looking for land, he offered to sell the eighty acres he held on the Nerang River three miles from Southport. Following an inspection of the property, Johan Meyer acquired James Beattie's land at Narrowneck and relocated his family to the only house on the property, known as the House of Blazes.

Initially developing a sugar plantation and sugar mill Joan Meyer also saw the opportunity for business success in catering to the accommodation needs of the regular visitors to the beaches of the Gold Coast. He started the first horse and vehicular private ferry service across the Nerang River, referred to as the Meyer's Ferry and, in 1888, established the Main Beach Hotel (located at Main Beach, Queensland). In 1888, Meyer's family operated a coach service from Southport three times a week, that crossed the river at the ferry, taking passengers down to the main surf beach.

His Main Beach Hotel became a postal receiving office in 1889 which was officially called Elston (later renamed Surfers Paradise). In 1893, the hotel burned down and was only partially covered by insurance. During the 1890s, Johan Meyer's business went into decline and he faced financial ruin.

Johan Meyer died at the Southport Railway Station on Friday 18 October 1901. After his death, services lapsed and the area began to decline until the arrival of James Cavill in 1925.
