= The Pink Poodle =

Motel in Surfers Paradise, Queensland, Australia

Coordinates: 28.013276°S 153.430515°E

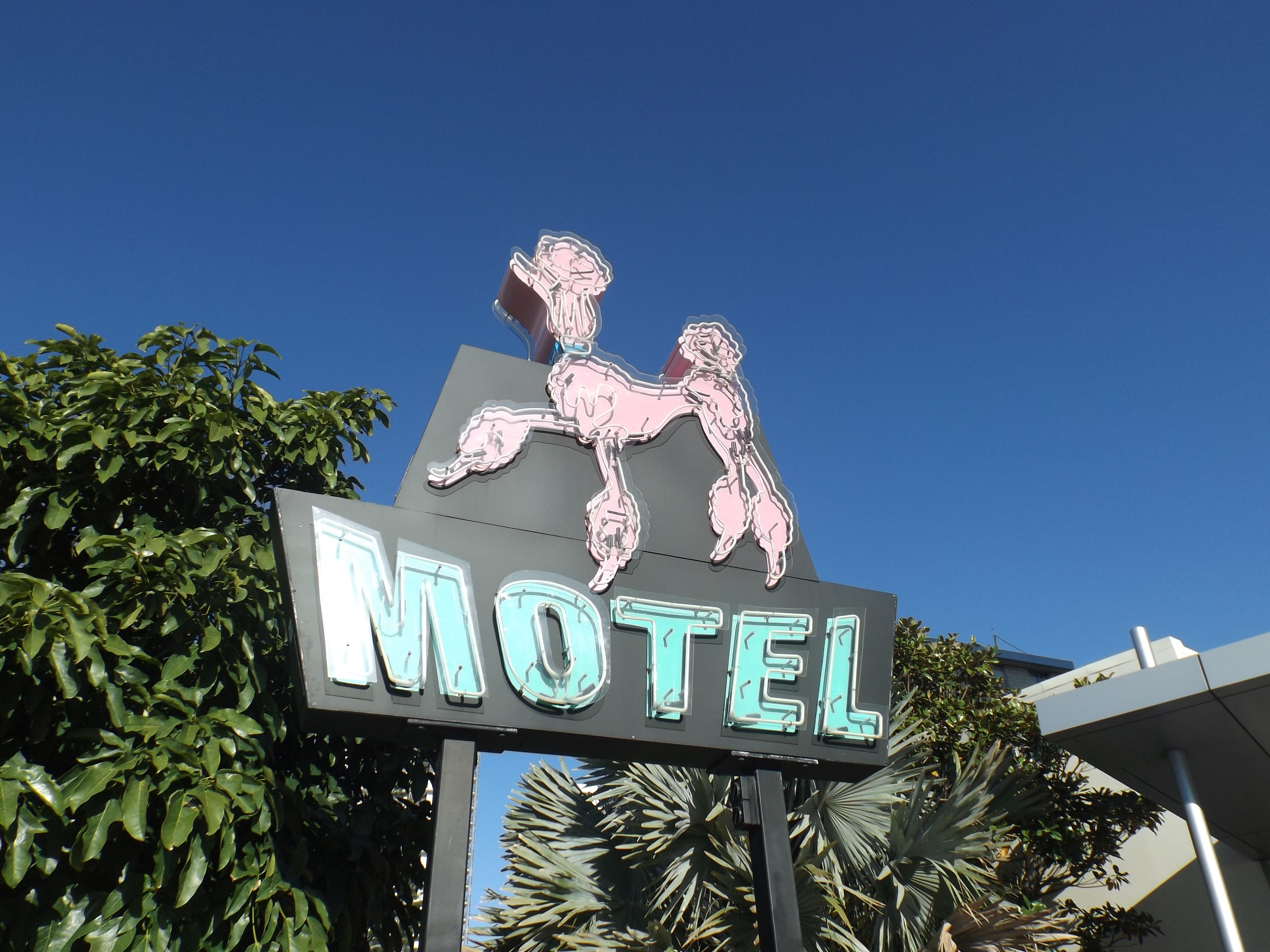
Sign in 2015

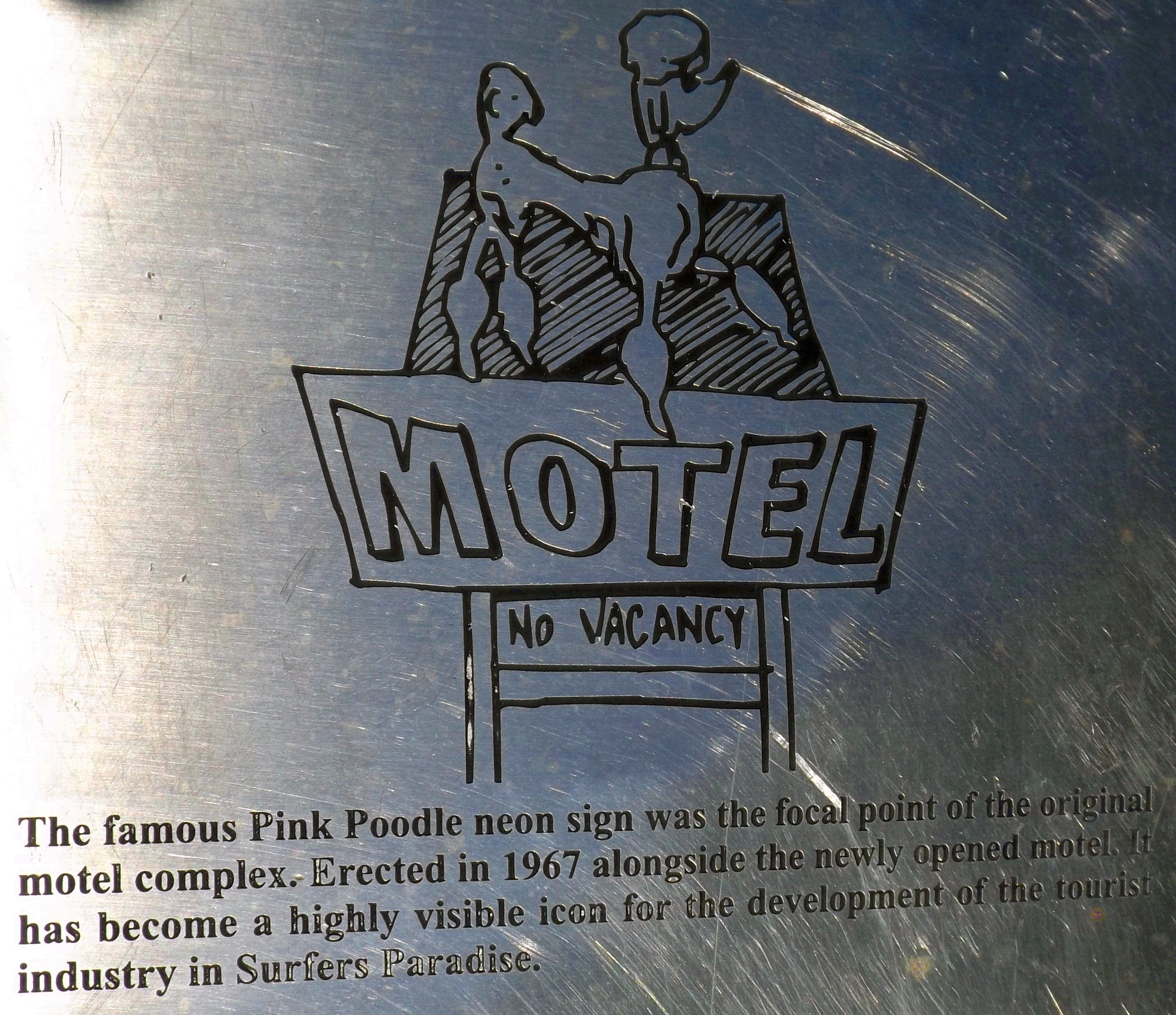
Plaque, 2015

The Pink Poodle was a motel in Surfers Paradise, Queensland, Australia. It was located on the corner of Fern Street and the Gold Coast Highway. Although no longer extant, its signage remains and is listed on the Gold Coast Local Heritage Register.

== History ==
The Pink Poodle was built in 1967 and features a neon sign of a pink poodle. Many felt it was synonymous with the "glitzy" allure of the Gold Coast and it was frequently used as an image to depict the Gold Coast. The motel was demolished in 2004 but the sign was preserved and relocated a short distance to 18 Fern Street. A bar and restaurant in the new development that replaced it bears the name "The Pink Poodle".

In 2005, the National Trust of Queensland nominated the sign to be one of Queensland's Heritage Icons.

In 2015, the signage appeared on a postage stamp issued by Australia Post as part of its Signs of the Times series.

== In popular culture ==
In 1995, author Matthew Condon published a novel, A Night at the Pink Poodle, about the rise and fall of a Gold Coast highrise apartment salesman.

In 2024, surfer and author Larry Blair with co-author Jeremy Goring, reference the "Pink Poodle" in their book, "The Outside", which details Blair's life with criminal parents. His stepfather, Frank "Baldy" Blair, while on the run following the infamous Mayne Nickless armored car heist, indicated he was going to purchase the Pink Poodle.
