= Chevron Island =

Island in Queensland, Australia

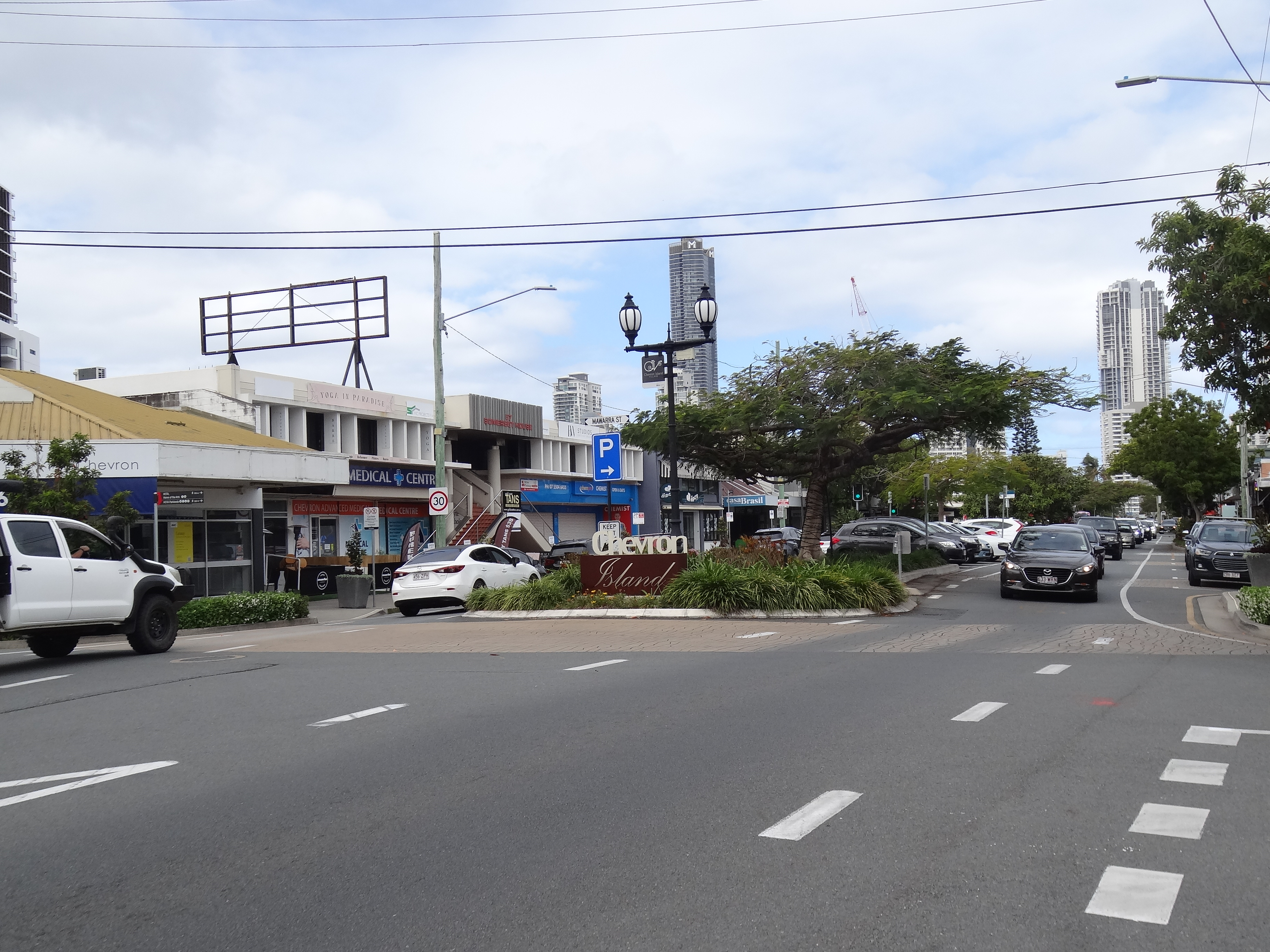
- Chevon Island CBD, 2023.

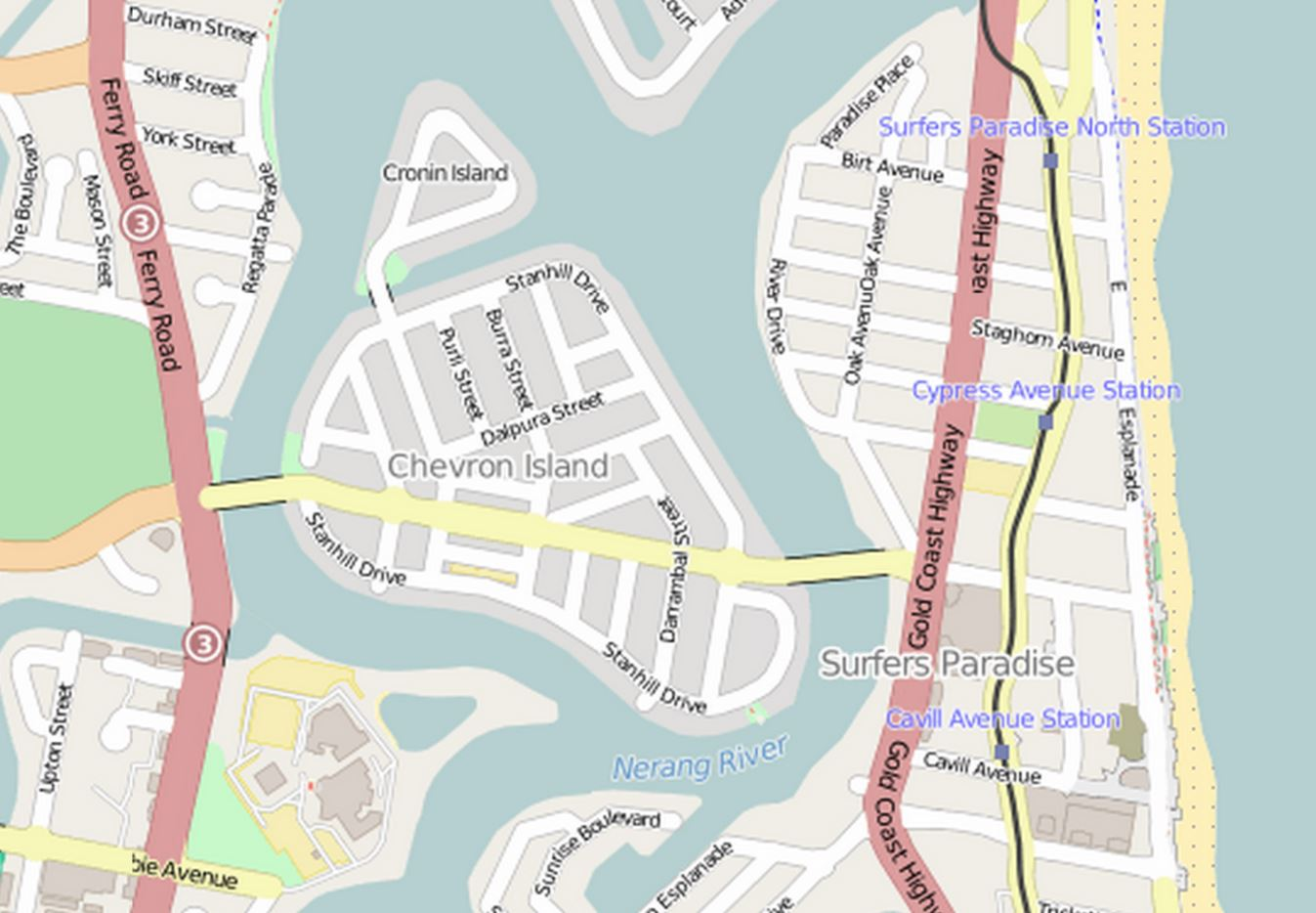
- Chevron Island in OpenStreetMap, 2015

Geography
- Location: Nerang River
- Total islands: 2
- Major islands: Chevron; Cronin
- Highest elevation: 2 m (7 ft)

Administration
- Australia
- State: Queensland
- Region: Gold Coast, Queensland
- Largest settlement: Surfers Paradise

Chevron Island is an urban island that lies in the Nerang River and is a neighbourhood within the suburb of Surfers Paradise on the Gold Coast, Queensland, Australia.

== History ==
Chevron Island is a natural island previously known as Goat Island. Goat Island hosted a cattle farm. The name Goat Island originated from when the original farm had a large goat population. Although it was a cattle farm, the goats helped keep the tougher vegetation from taking over. The goats were moved on after the sale of the farm and no records show what happened to them afterwards.

The Gold Coast has many man-made islands created from land reclamation; however Chevron Island already existed. The shape and height of the island were added to with sand fill and also by detaching the island from where HOTA now exists in the 1950s. Chevron Island also had a landing point for the barge/ferry crossing the Nerang River to Cavill Avenue. Prior to land reclamation, the Nerang River was wide and shallow with many sandbanks with shifting riverbanks. Through dredging, deeper channels were created for shipping in the river with the spoil being used to create inhabitable islands and permanent river edge embankments, all of which facilitated residential and commercial development.

== Geography ==
Chevron Island is a medium density residential area. It is connected by two bridges to Southport and Bundall to the west and to the coastal strip of Surfers Paradise to the east with Thomas Drive continuing from Slatyer Road in Southport/Bundall through to Elkhorn Avenue in coastal strip of Surfers Paradise.

The island has an elevation of 2 metres (6 ft 7 in) above sea level at the mean high tide mark.

Cronin Island (27°59′34″S 153°25′06″E) is a small reclaimed island accessible from Chrevon Island and also lies within the Nerang River. Cronin Island is named after Jack Cronin, the first engineer employed by the Southport Town Council (now the Gold Coast City Council).

In 2020, the Hota Green Bridge, a 130-metre long, 5-metre wide pedestrian and cycle bridge was opened to connect Chevron Island to Surfers Paradise.
