= Surfers Paradise =

- Suburb
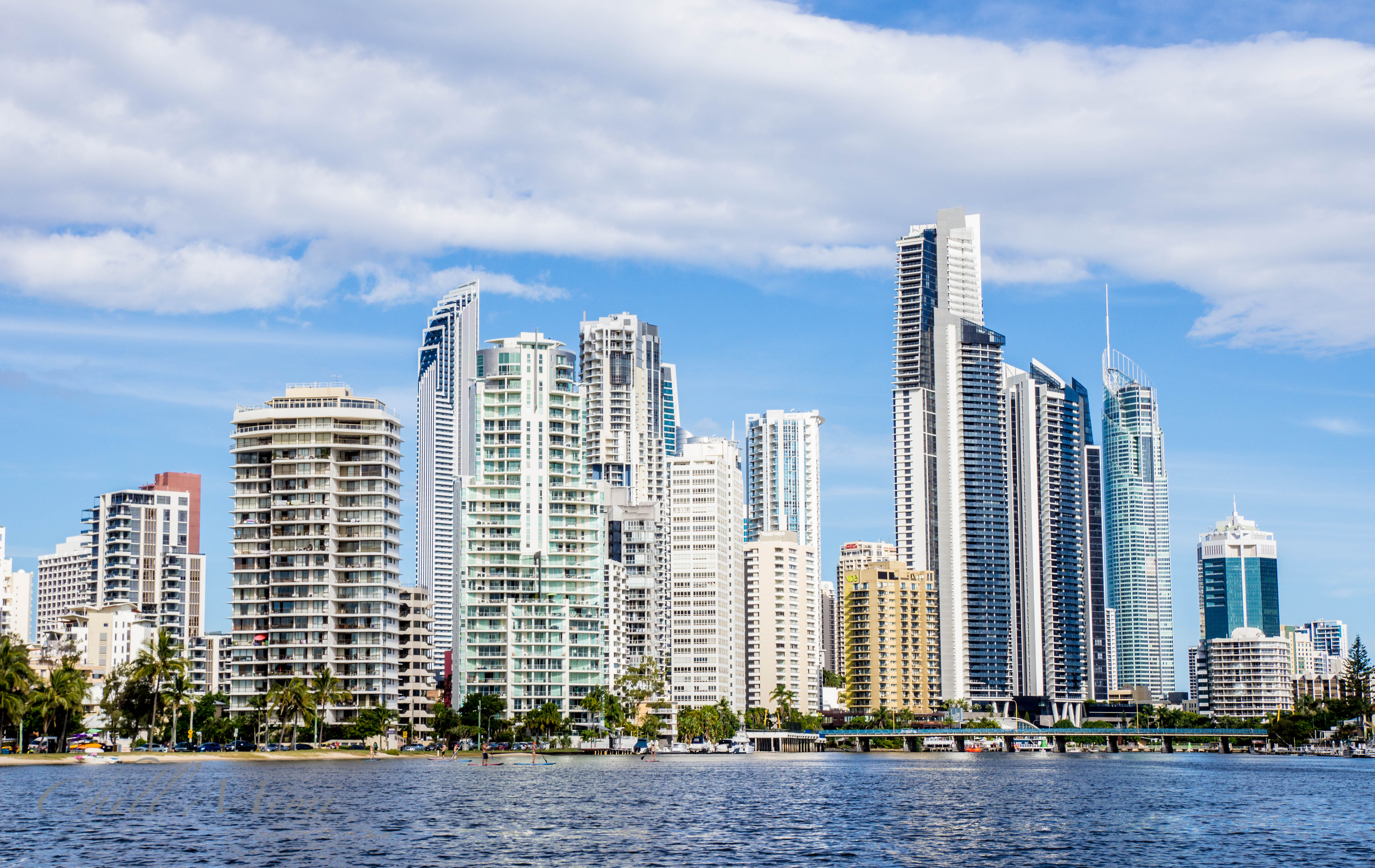
- Surfers Paradise, as seen from Nerang River

- Interactive map of Surfers Paradise
- Coordinates: 28.0000°S 153.4166°E
- Country: Australia
- State: Queensland
- City: Gold Coast
- LGA: City of Gold Coast
- Location: 31 km (19 mi) N of Tweed Heads; 78 km (48 mi) S of Brisbane
- Established: 1933

Government
  - State electorate: Surfers Paradise
  - Federal division: Moncrieff

Area
  - Total: 6.2 km^{2} (2.4 sq mi)
- Elevation: 11 m (36 ft)

Population
  - Total: 55,909 (2021)https://abs.gov.au/census/find-census-data/quickstats/2021/SED30082
  - Density: 9,020/km^{2} (23,360/sq mi)
- Time zone: UTC+10:00 (AEST)
- Postcode: 4217
- Mean max temp: 25 °C (77 °F)
- Mean min temp: 17 °C (63 °F)
- Annual rainfall: 1,258 mm (49.5 in)
Suburbs around Surfers Paradise
Southport	Main Beach	Coral Sea
Bundall	Surfers Paradise	Coral Sea
Broadbeach Waters	Broadbeach	Coral Sea

Surfers Paradise (colloquially known as Surfers) is a central suburb of the City of Gold Coast, Queensland, Australia. In the 2021 census, Surfers Paradise had a population of 55,909 people.

The suburb has many high-rise apartment buildings and a wide surf beach. The feature of the heart of the suburb is Cavill Mall, which runs through the shopping and entertainment precinct. Cavill Avenue, named after Jim Cavill, an early hotel owner, is one of the busiest shopping strips in Queensland, and the centre of activity for night life. One of the features of the area is the Surfers Paradise Meter Maids designed to build goodwill with tourists.

Surfers Paradise is the Gold Coast's main entertainment and tourism centre and the suburb's many high-rise buildings are the best known feature of the city's skyline.

In 2009 as part of the Q150 celebrations, Surfers Paradise was announced as one of the Q150 Icons of Queensland for its role as a "location".

== Geography ==
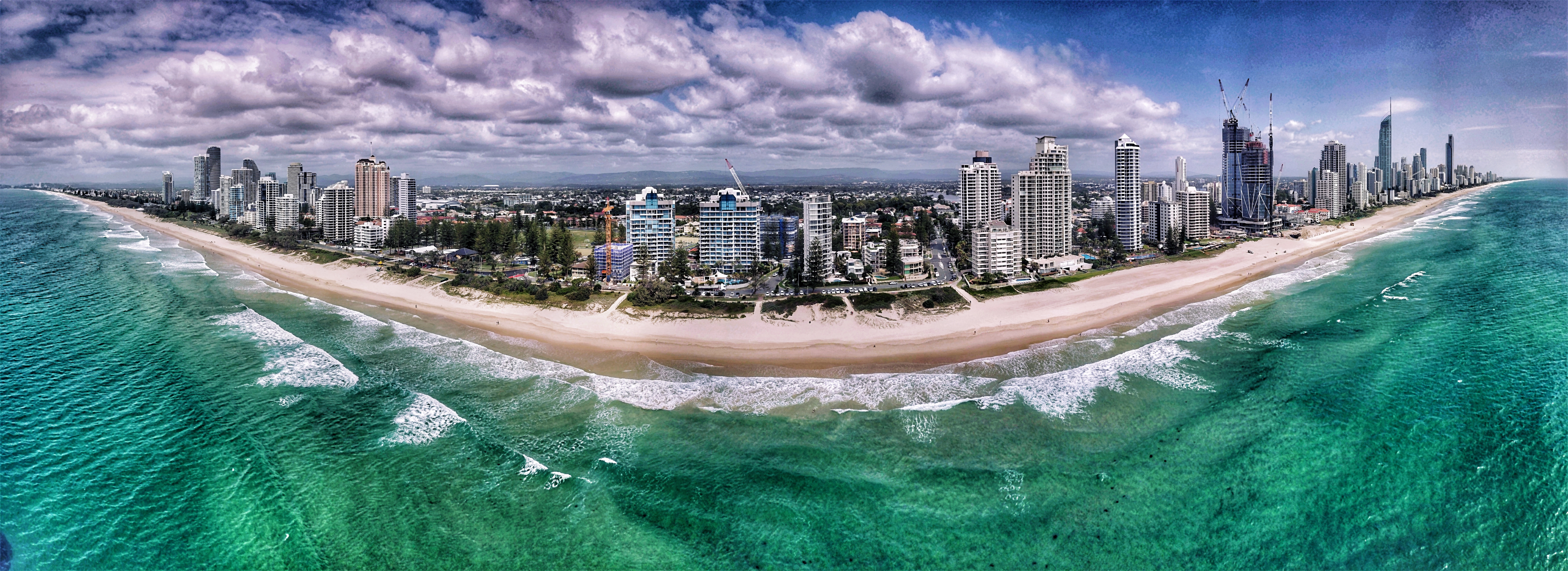
Aerial perspective of the coast along Surfers Paradise. Taken Autumn 2018.

Surfers Point is bounded to the east by the Coral Sea of the Pacific Ocean. The entire coastline of Surfers Paradise is called Surfers Paradise Beach (28.0022°S 153.4314°E) and is a continuous sandy surf beach. The Esplanade is a road that runs along the coast in the north-east of the suburb.

It is bounded to the north-west by the Nerang River which then flows through the suburb to exit at the suburb's most northerly boundary almost at the mouth of the river where it flows into the southern end of Moreton Bay. The south-west of the suburb is land on the western bank of the river and is bounded by Bundall Road.

The Gold Coast Highway passes through the suburb from north to south.

The course of the river has been modified extensively in the latter part of the 20th century to create permanent islands for residential development, some of which were natural features while others were on reclaimed land created by a system of canals.

Macintosh Island is an island, substantially redeveloped to create a canal residential estate (27.9858°S 153.4236°E). It was named after Hugh Macintosh, a draftsman in the Queensland Lands Department, who was heavily involved in the surveying of Gold Coast area. It is connected to the mainland by the Gold Coast Highway, which passes through the eastern part of the island from north (Main Beach) to south (Surfers Paradise).

Chevron Island is a natural island which has been developed for residential use as a neighbourhood (27.9969°S 153.4199°E). Thomas Drive is the main road on an east–west axis and which connects the island by two bridges to mainland Surfers Paradise to the east and to the suburb or Southport to the west. It has another bridge to the north to Cronin Island (27.9927°S 153.4186°E), a smaller reclaimed island and residential neighbourhood which is only accessible by road via Chevron Island. Cronin Island is named after Jack Cronin, the first engineer employed by the Southport Town Council (now the Gold Coast City Council).

Budds Beach is a beach on the Nerang River on the mainland part of the suburb facing Macintosh Island, Chrevron Island and Cronin Island (27.9930°S 153.4241°E). It was named after Alan Foster Budd who built a house there in the 1940s. Jarriparilla Cove is the body of water that lies between Budds Beach and Macintosh Island (27.99°S 153.4261°E). It is a traditional Aboriginal name.

Girung Island is a small undeveloped island (28.0095°S 153.4191°E) named using Yugambeh word for the flying foxes (fruit bats) which roost on the island.

Despite its name, the Isle of Capri is not an island but a canal residential neighbourhood (28.0116°S 153.4244°E) in the south-west of the suburb on the western side of the Nerang River. Also on the western side of the river and to the north of the Isle of Capri is Evandale Park (28.0016°S 153.4161°E) which is a park which contains the Gold Coast Council Chambers (administrative centre) and the council's Home of the Arts cultural precinct.

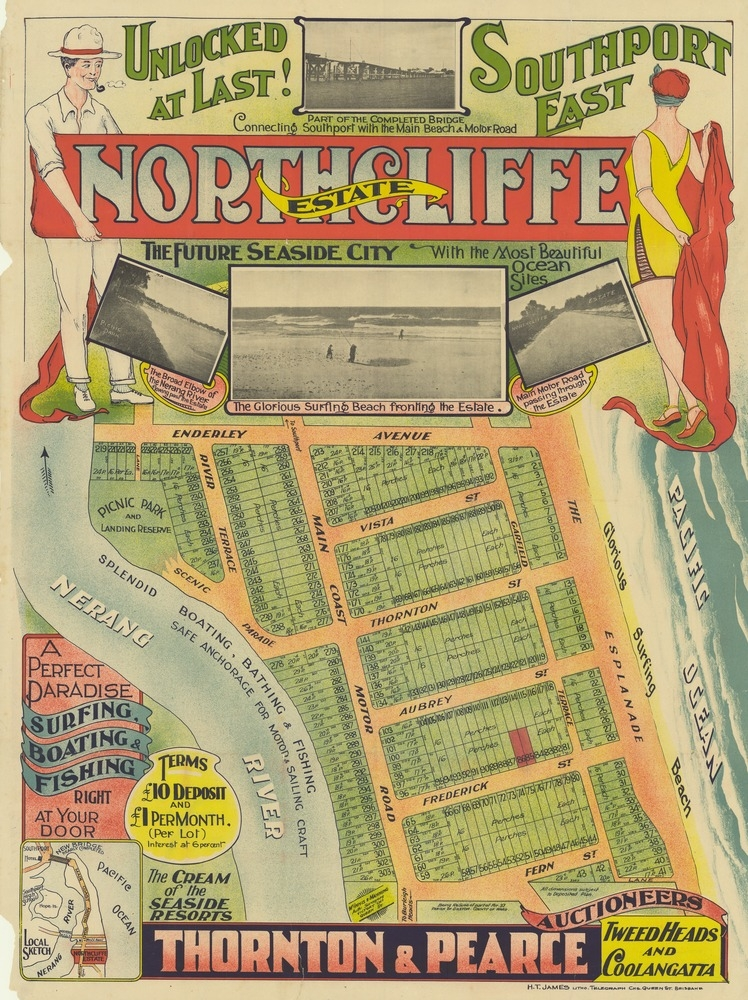
Real estate map of Northcliffe Estate, now the heart of Surfers Paradise, c. 1920s

Northcliffe Beach is a section of the Surfers Paradise Beach (28.0061°S 153.4316°E) in the area of Northcliffe Terrace, a name that refers to a 1920s real estate development between Enderley Avenue and Fern Street.

== History ==
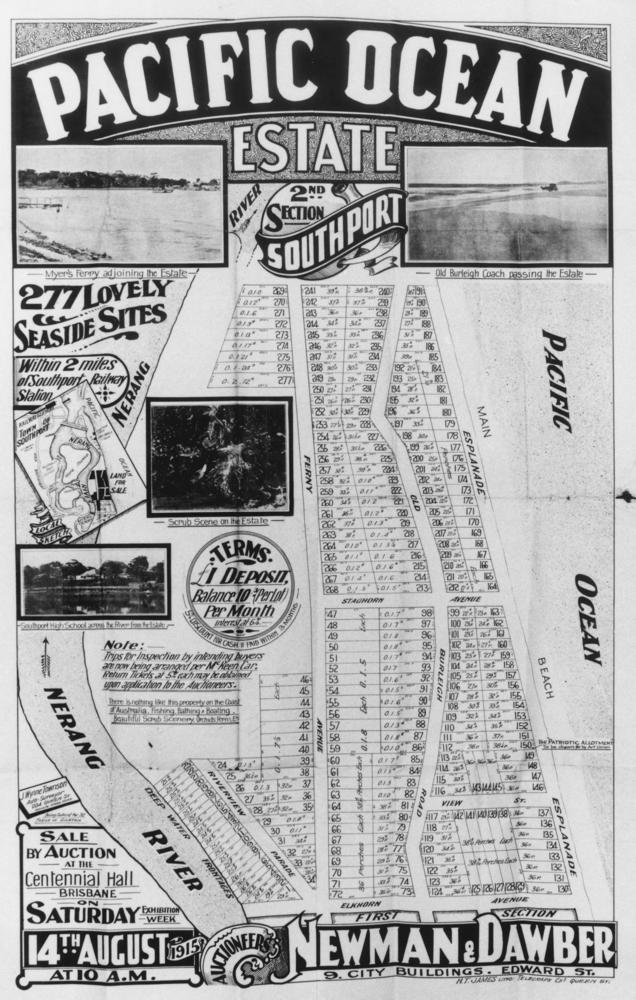
Estate map for Pacific Ocean Estate, north of Elkhorn Avenue, 1915

James Beattie, a farmer, became the first European to settle in the area when he staked out an 80-acre (32 ha) farm on the northern bank of the Nerang River, close to present-day Cavill Avenue. The farm proved unsuccessful and was sold in 1877 to German immigrant Johan Meyer, who turned the land into a sugar farm and mill. Meyer also had little luck growing in the sandy soil and within a decade had auctioned the farm to focus on providing access to tourists wanting to visit the surf beach. From 1880 to 1928, Meyer's Ferry operated across the Nerang River transporting passengers and vehicles. He operated a horse-and-buggy service from the Southport railway station to the beach. He built the Main Beach Hotel. By 1889, Meyer's hotel had become a post receiving office and subdivisions surrounding it were called Elston, named by the Southport postmaster after his wife's home in Southport, Lancashire, England. The Main Beach Hotel licence lapsed after Meyer's death in 1901 and for 16 years Elston was a tourist town without a hotel or post office.

In 1917, a land auction was held by Brisbane real estate company Arthur Blackwood to sell subdivided blocks in Elston as the "Surfers' Paradise Estate", but the auction failed because access was difficult. This was the first recorded reference to the name Surfers Paradise.

Elston began to get more visitors after the opening of Jubilee Bridge and the extension of the South Coast Road in 1925. Elston was no longer cut off by the river and speculators began buying land around Elston and further south at Burleigh Heads. Estates down the coast were promoted and hotels opened to accommodate tourists and investors.

In 1925, Brisbane hotelier Jim Cavill opened the Surfers Paradise Hotel located on what would later become the site of the Surfers Paradise Centre which incorporates the Surfers Paradise Beer Garden and Hard Rock Cafe. In opening the hotel and neighbouring zoo, Cavill created the first attraction in the suburb. Located between the ferry jetty and the white surf beach off the South Coast Road, it became popular and shops and services sprang up around it. In the following years Cavill pushed to have the name Elston changed to Surfers' Paradise. The suburb was officially renamed on 1 December 1933 after the local council felt the Surfers Paradise name was more marketable. In July 1936 Cavill's timber hotel burnt to the ground and was rebuilt the following year.

In 1934, Surfers Paradise State School was first established on the north-east corner of Laycock Street and the Gold Coast Highway (now Gold Coast Boulevard), three blocks south of Cavill Avenue (28.0038°S 153.4289°E). In 1976, the school relocated to its current site on the Isle of Capri.

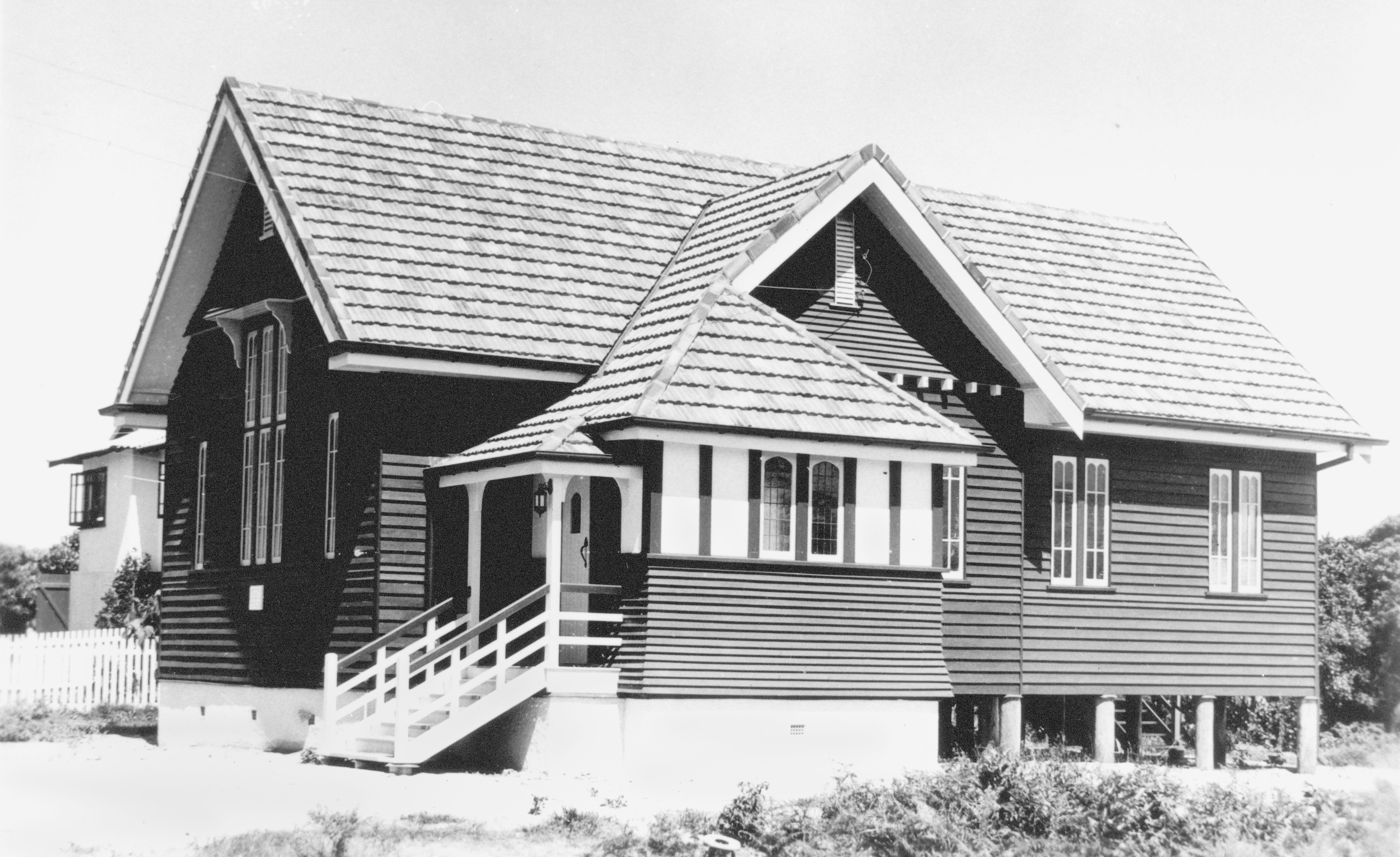
Surfers Paradise Methodist Church, c. 1940

In December 1938, tenders were called to construct a Methodist church in Hamilton Avenue, just off the Pacific Highway, close to the beach. The church was to seat 140 people and was designed by architect W. J. E. Kerrison. It was anticipated that the church would open at Easter in 1939. However, tenders were called again in July 1939. In June 1940, church officials indicated that they still did not have sufficient funds to build the church. In September 1940, tenders were called again to build the church in Clifford Street. On Saturday 23 October 1940, the stump-capping ceremony was held. On Saturday 14 December 1940, the Surfers Paradise Methodist Church was opened by Reverend Wilfred Slater, the President of the Methodist Conference. In 1977, it was part of the amalgamation that created the Uniting Church in Australia and became known as Clifford Street Uniting Church. The church celebrated its 50th anniversary in December 1990. An amalgamation of the Uniting Church congregations on the Gold Coast resulted in the closure of the Clifford Street church, which was relocated to Emmanuel College in Carrara to serve as their chapel. It was officially reopened at the college on 7 July 1991.

In the late 40s Margot Kelly moved here and had the Hibiscus Room built. This was a fine-dining restaurant and entertainment venue that attracted an exclusive clientele. A development boom followed in the 1950s and 1960s. The first highrise in Surfers Paradise was erected in 1959 and was named the Kinkabool. The Kinkabool stood 10 stories high and remains to this day in Hanlan Street. Many tall apartment buildings were constructed in the decades that followed, including the iconic buildings included the Iluka, St Tropez and The Pink Poodle. The boom later saw strong Japanese investment in the 1980s.

Little remains of the early vegetation or natural features of the area and even the historical association of the beachfront development with the river is tenuous. The early subdivision pattern remains, although later reclamation of the islands in the Nerang River as housing estates (e.g. Chevron Island), and the bridges to those islands, have created a contrast reflected in subdivision and building form. Some early remnants survived such as Budds Beach — a low-scale open area on the river which even in the early history of the area was a centre for boating, fishing and swimming.

In the early 2010s, the annual Surfers Paradise Festival was held in March and April. It was a celebration of local music, food, fashion, film and art and is a key driver of the Gold Coast's long-term cultural development. Across the four weekends of the festival, the Surfers Paradise precinct was transformed into a vibrant showcase of the Gold Coast's emerging arts and cultural scene.The festival comprised an accessible mix of family events, exhibitions, live music, street markets and short film screenings.

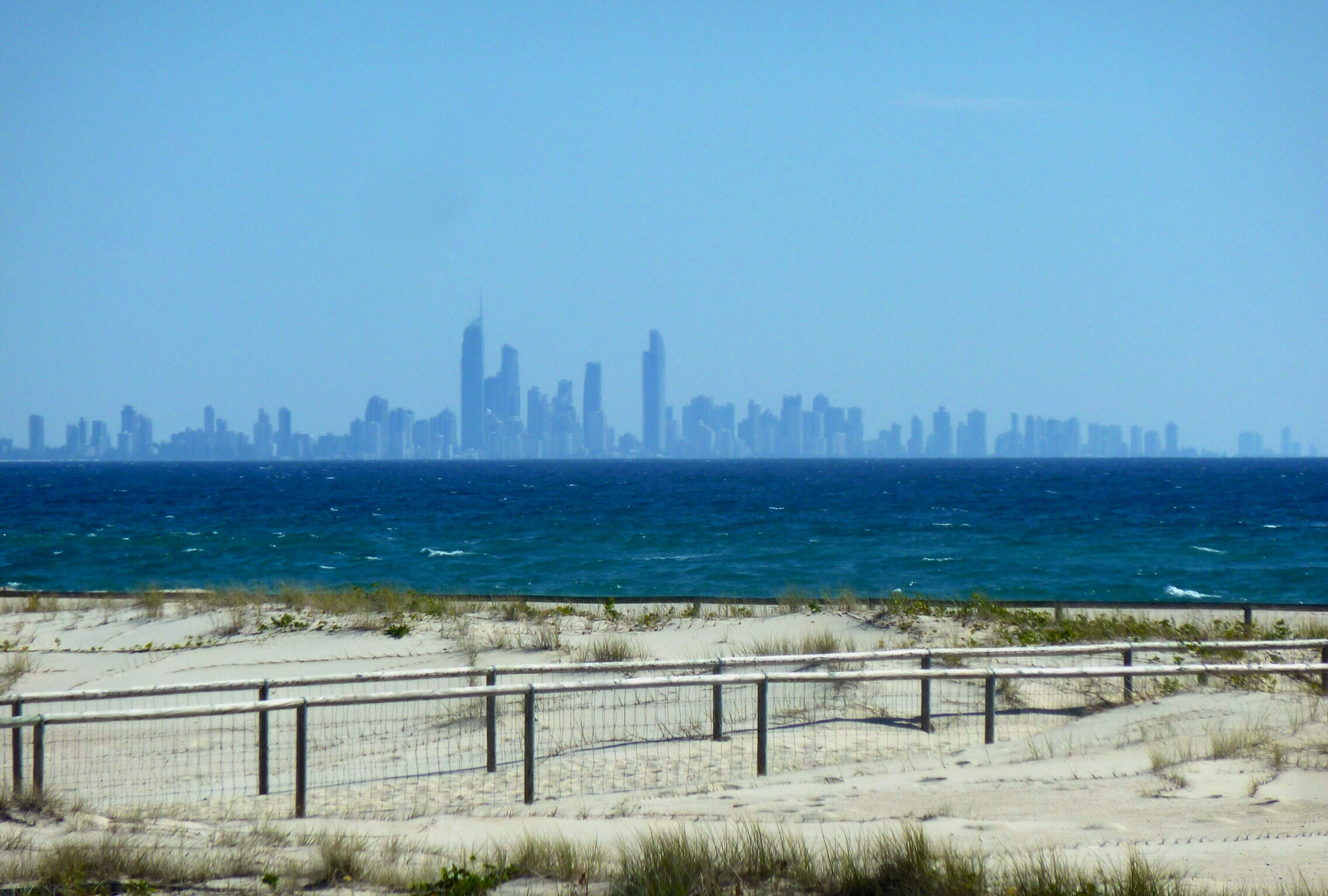
Surfers Paradise high-rise, visible from Coolangatta, 2014

By 2020, minor changes had occurred in extending the road along the beachfront since the early subdivision and The Esplanade road is now a focus of activity, with supporting shops and restaurants. The intensity of activity, centred on Cavill, Orchid and Elkhorn Avenues, is reflected in the density of development. Of all places on the Gold Coast the high-rise buildings in this area constitute a dominant and enduring image visible from as far south as Coolangatta and from the mountain resorts of the hinterland.

== Demographics ==
In the 2011 census, the suburb of Surfers Paradise had a population of 19,668 people.

In the 2016 census, the suburb of Surfers Paradise had a population of 23,689 people. Of these 51.1% were male and 48.9% were female. The median age of the Surfers Paradise population was 37 years, 1 year below the national median of 38. 44.6% of people were born in Australia. The next most common countries of birth were New Zealand 7.1%, England 3.7%, India 3.6%, Brazil 2.4% and Japan 2.1%. 59.3% of people spoke only English at home. Other languages spoken at home included Mandarin 2.5%, Portuguese 2.4%, Japanese 2.3%, Punjabi 1.8% and Spanish 1.6%. The most common responses for religion were No Religion 29.2% and Catholic 19.3%. Surfers Paradise was an ethnically diverse suburb, including the largest Jewish community (119 people; 0.5%), the largest Spanish Australian community (285 people; 1.2%), and the largest Lebanese Australian community (84 people; 0.4%) of any suburb in Queensland.

In the 2021 census, the suburb of Surfers Paradise had a population of 26,412 people.

== Heritage listings ==
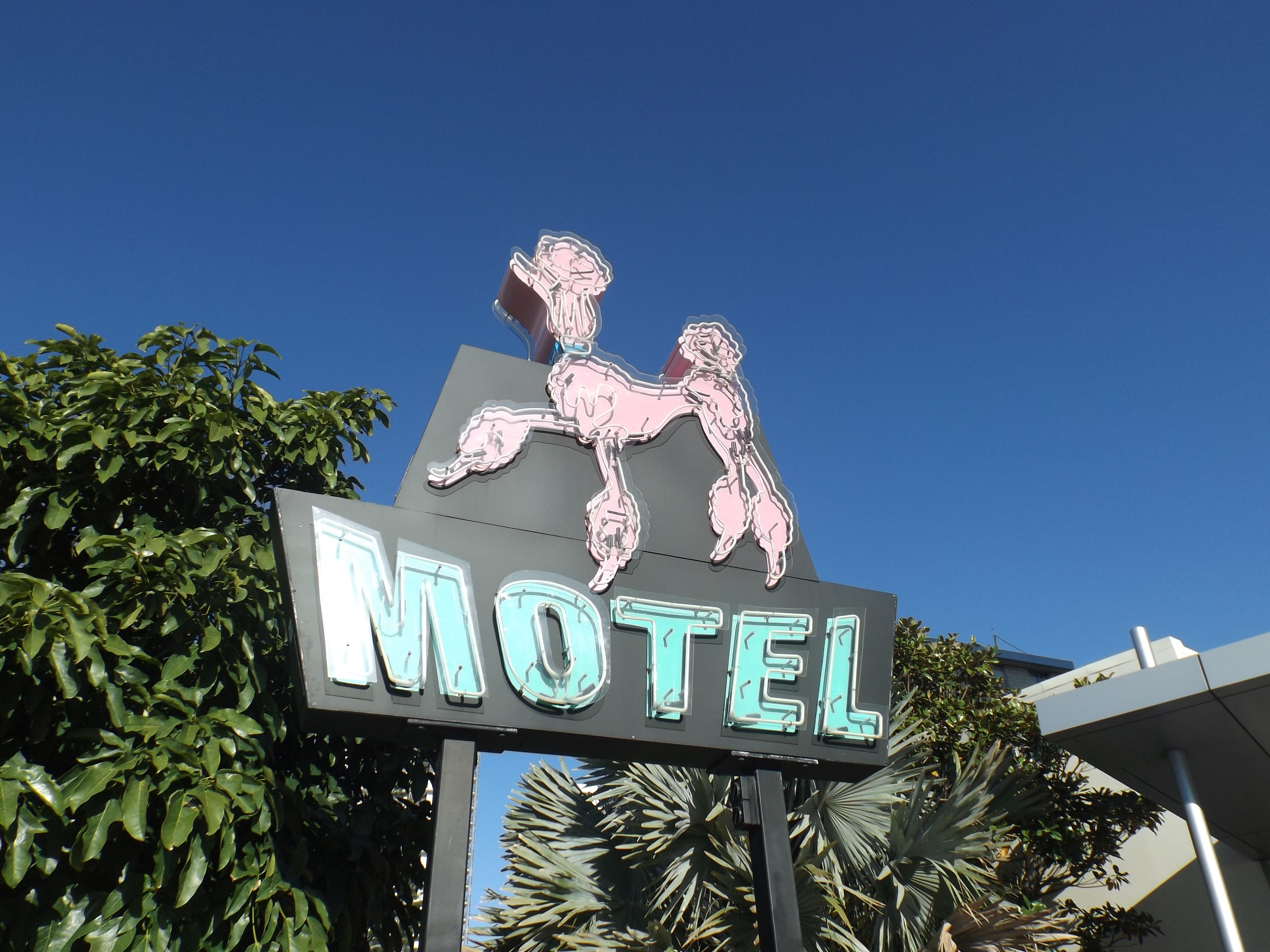
The Pink Poodle Sign

Surfers Paradise has a number of heritage-listed structures, including:

- 135 Bundall Road (Evandale Park): St Margaret's Church (originally in Nerang)
- 44 Cavill Avenue (Cavill Park): Matey Memorial, a 1957 bronze statue of a homeless dog
- 18 Fern Street: The Pink Poodle sign
- 32–34 Hanlan Street: Kinkabool, one of the original apartment blocks

== Attractions ==
=== Foreshore ===
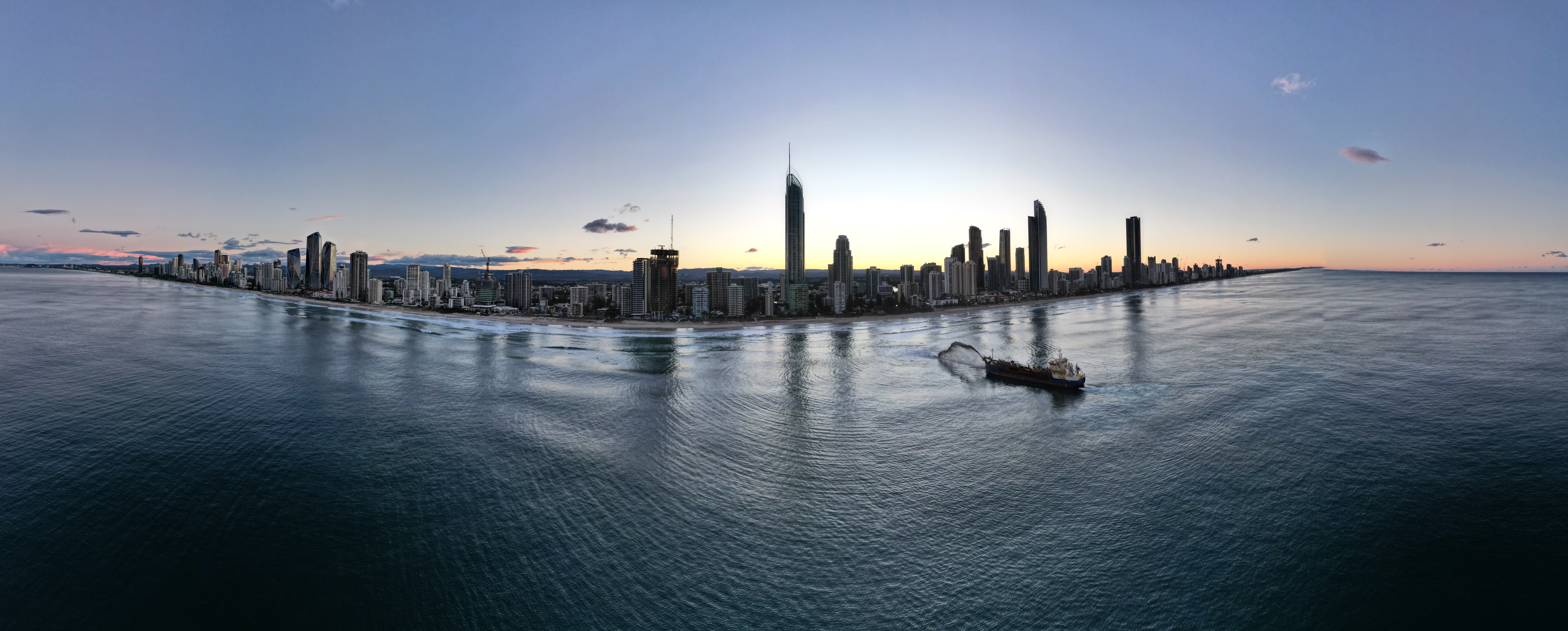
Gold Coast beach panorama

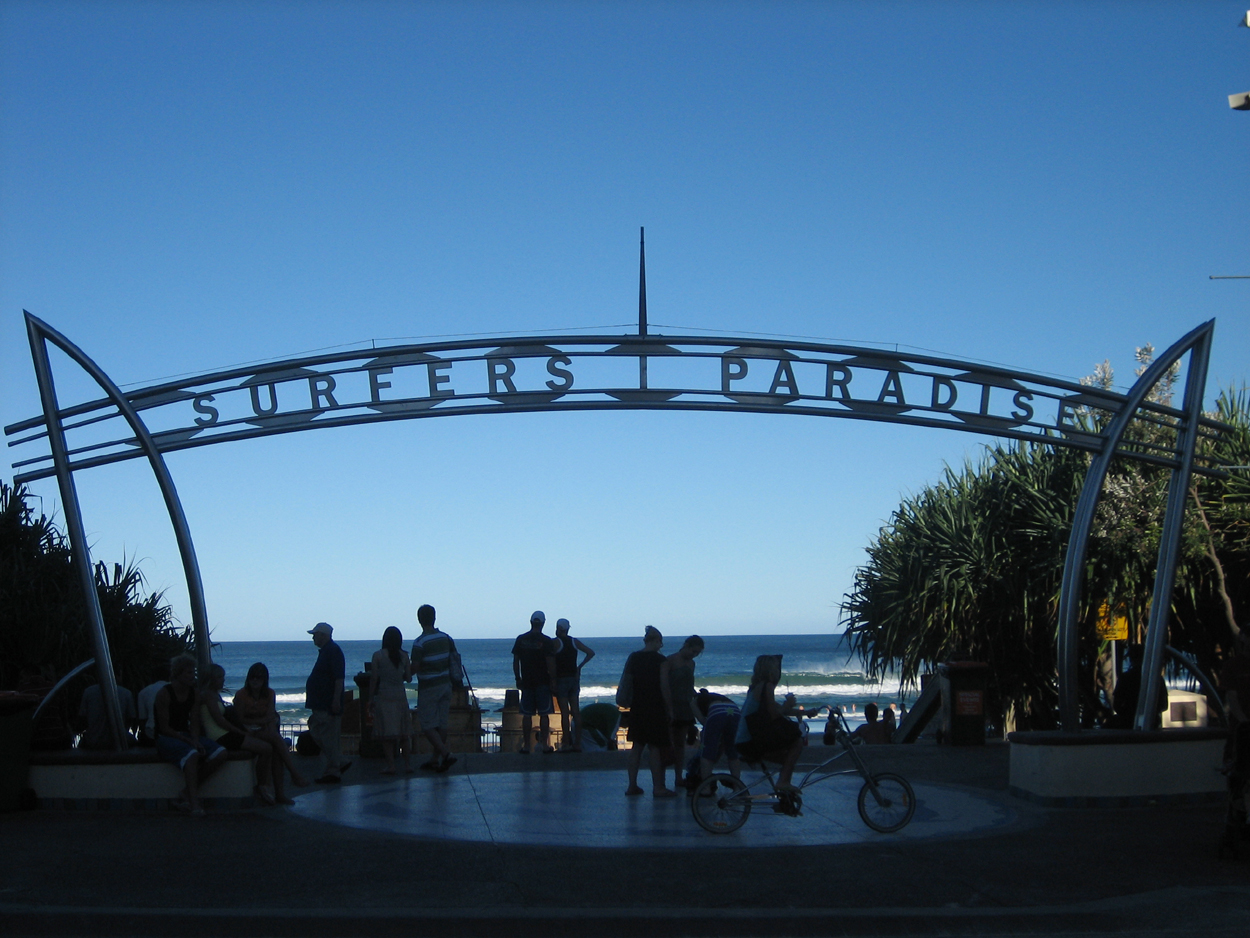
Main entrance to the beach

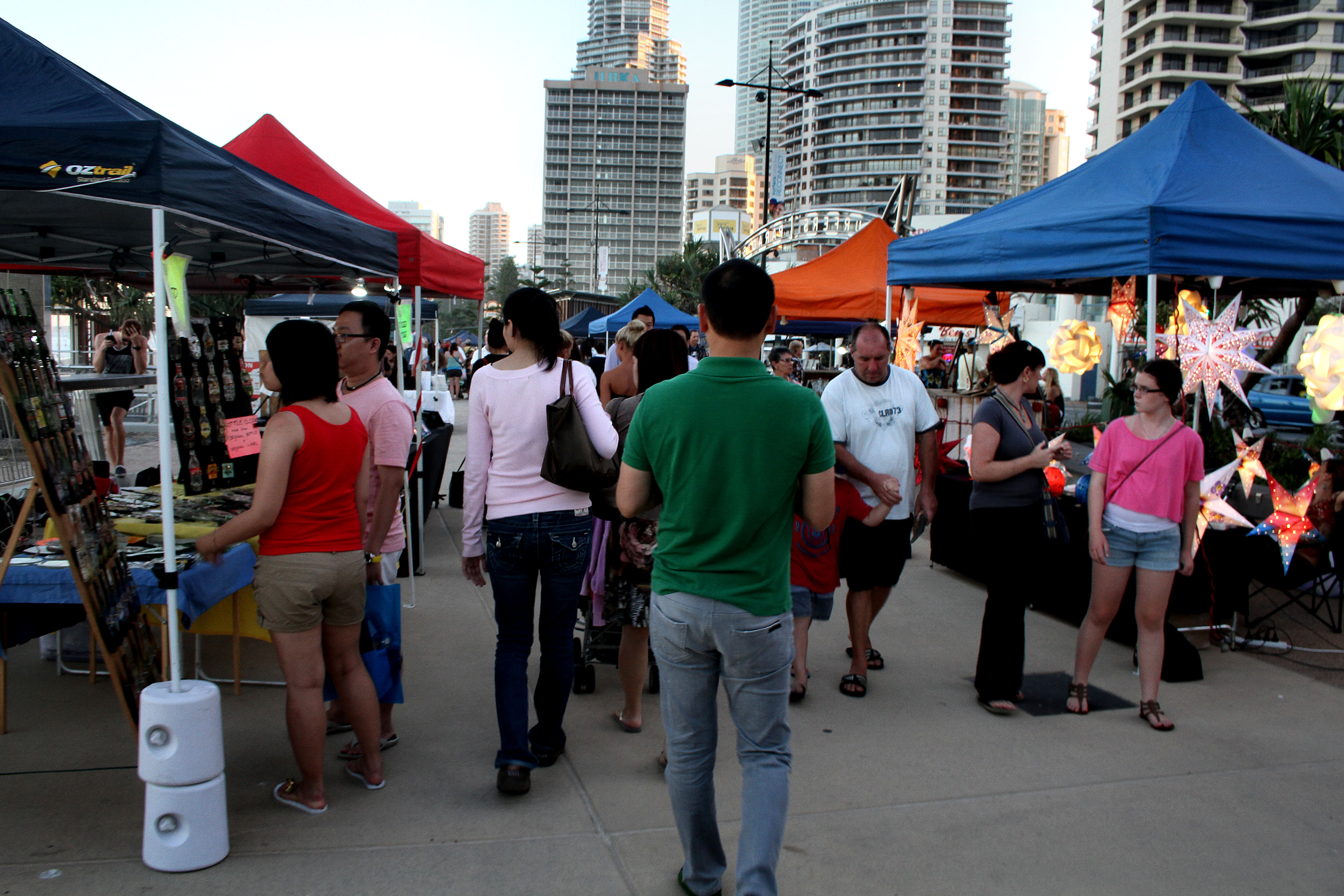
Night markets in Surfers Paradise

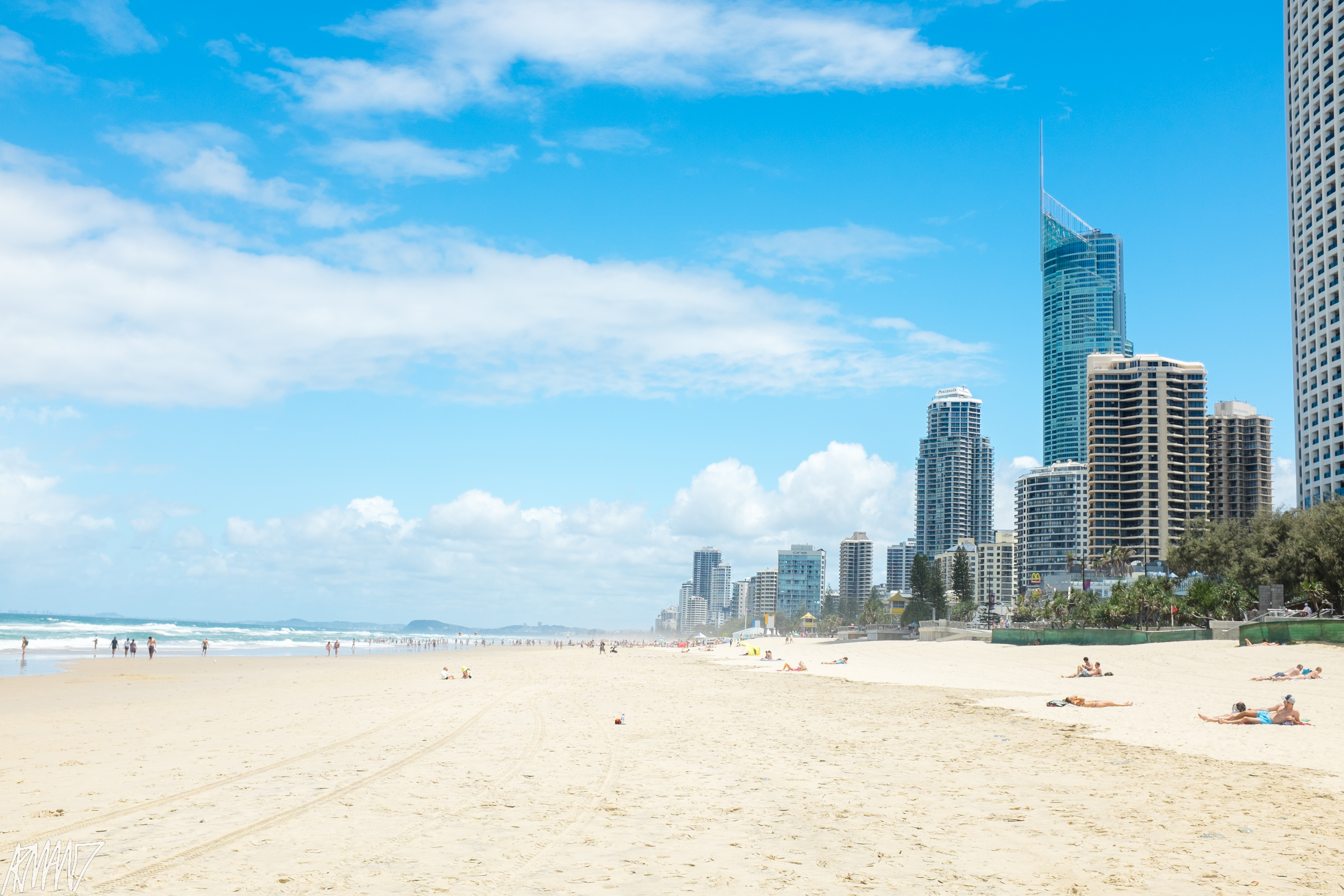
Surfers Paradise beach, January 2015

Surfers Paradise is fronted to the east by the Surfers Paradise Foreshore, a rejuvenated public space that fronts Surfers Paradise Beach and the Pacific Ocean. The Foreshore was completed in 2011 and feature contemporary coastal streetscaping that incorporates existing trees and vegetation, including about 95 pandanus trees. The masterplanned space hosts a full calendar of free public events such as the Australian Sand Sculpting Championships. The area of Surfers Paradise east of Surfers Paradise Boulevard sprawling towards the beach tends to focus on family-friendly attractions such as Time Zone, Ripley's Believe it or Not museum and Adrenalin Park; while the nightclubs and adult entertainment tend to be concentrated in the western part of the suburb.

=== Accommodations ===
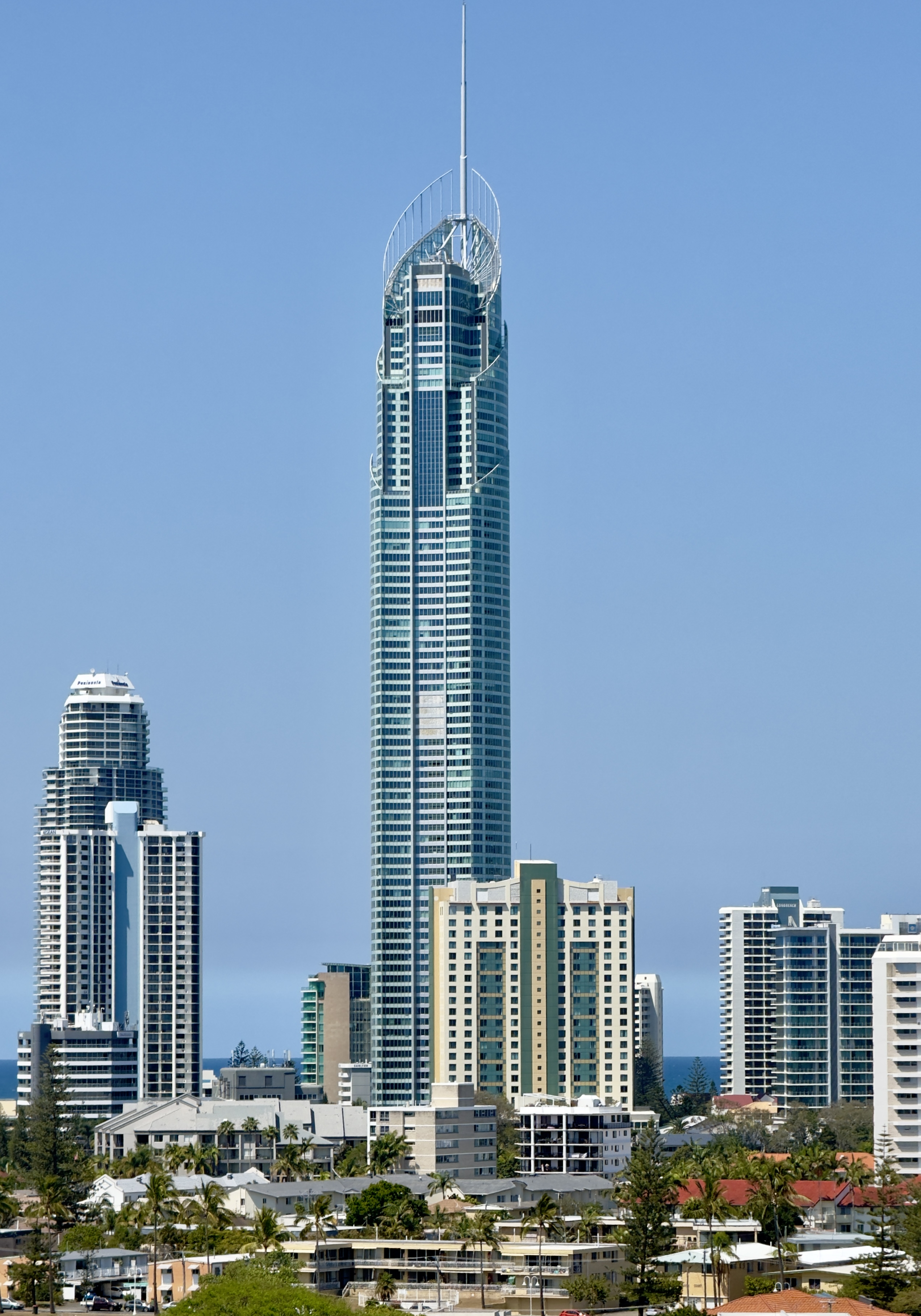
Q1 – The world's fifth tallest residential building

The precinct offers high rise accommodations to tourists such as Circle on Cavill, Hilton, Q1 and Soul.

Retail

Surfers Paradise offers some of the Gold Coast's best shopping opportunities, with a variety of stores located in Cavill Avenue and surrounding streets as well as at the Centro Surfers Paradise Shopping Centre is located in Cavill Avenue.

=== Adrenalin Park ===
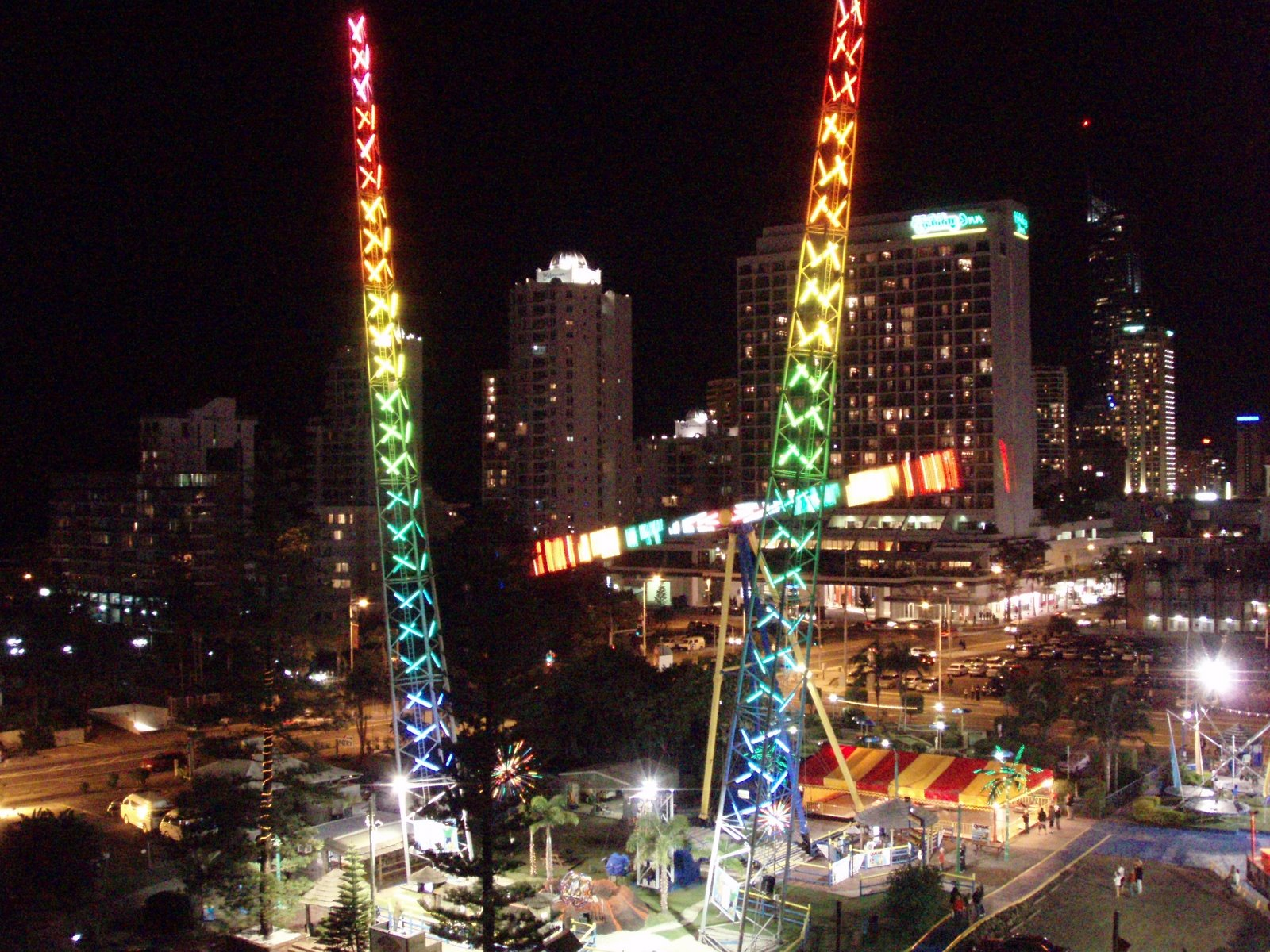
Adrenalin Park in 2007.

Adrenalin Park is a small amusement park in Surfers Paradise operated by Funtime. The park features the Sling Shot and Vomatron rides as well as a mini golf course.

=== Meter Maids ===
The Surfers Paradise Meter Maids were introduced in 1965 when entrepreneur Bernie Elsey opposed the installation of parking meters in Surfers Paradise. The maids were hired to top up expired parking meters with coins and dressed in gold bikinis. Meter feeding is against the law but council decided to ignore the offence due to the good publicity it garnered. Gold Coast Mayor Bruce Small promoted the city in 1967 through the use of the bikini-clad meters maids.

The meter maids initially dressed in gold lamé bikinis and a tiara but the outfit would go through several changes during their existence. The attire has now evolved into a gold lycra bikini and an Akubra hat. A sash is often worn emblazoned "Surfers Paradise Meter Maids". Controversial retired Australian rules football player Warwick Capper underwent a short stint as a Surfers Paradise meter maid in 2007.

The evolution of parking meters to no longer take coins has ended the meter maids's traditional role, but they continue to assist visitors and participate in tourism events.

=== Nightlife Precinct ===
The "Gold Coast Nightlife Precinct" offers many after-dark activities for visitors, especially around Cavill Avenue. The precinct is considered Australia's nightlife capital and attracts close to 20,000 visitors daily. The precinct also hosts the largest Schoolies week event in the country, attracting tens of thousands of school leavers to the precinct. The Gold Coast Music Hall on Beach Rd is set to open in late 2027.

== Events ==
Surfers Paradise hosts a calendar of free public events, largely targeting residents of the Gold Coast, visitors from southeast Queensland and interstate and international tourists.

=== Gold Coast Marathon ===
In July, Surfers Paradise hosts the annual Gold Coast Marathon in July, attracting runners from around the world.

=== Auto Racing ===
==== IndyCar ====
The roads of Surfers Paradise have been used for auto racing with the inaugural IndyCar race on the circuit sanctioned by Championship Auto Racing Teams (CART) taking place in 1991. The race under various names would be part of the schedules of CART and its successor organisation the Champ Car World Series until 2007, when the series merged with their rivals the IndyCar Series. The final IndyCar race at Surfers Paradise would take place in October 2008 sanctioned by the IndyCar Series as a non-championship round.

==== Supercars ====
Australian Supercars would first race at Surfers Paradise as a support race for the IndyCar races in the V8 Supercar Challenge starting in 1994. Following the final IndyCar race at the track in 2008, Supercars would take over the traditional October race date for the Gold Coast 500 starting in 2010, remaining on the Supercars Championship schedule as of 2026.

=== Schoolies ===
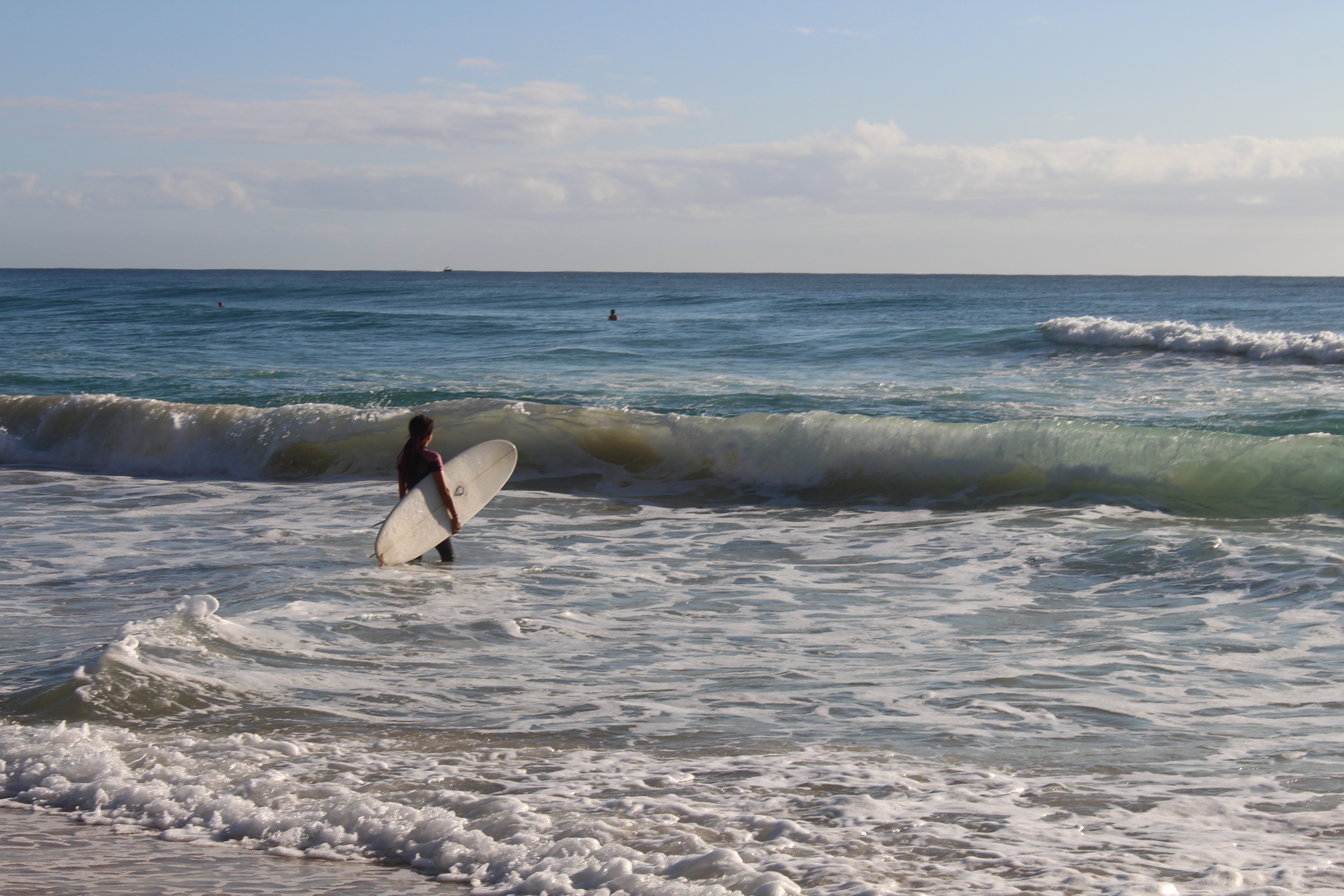
Surfing, a popular recreational sport at the Surfers Paradise Beach

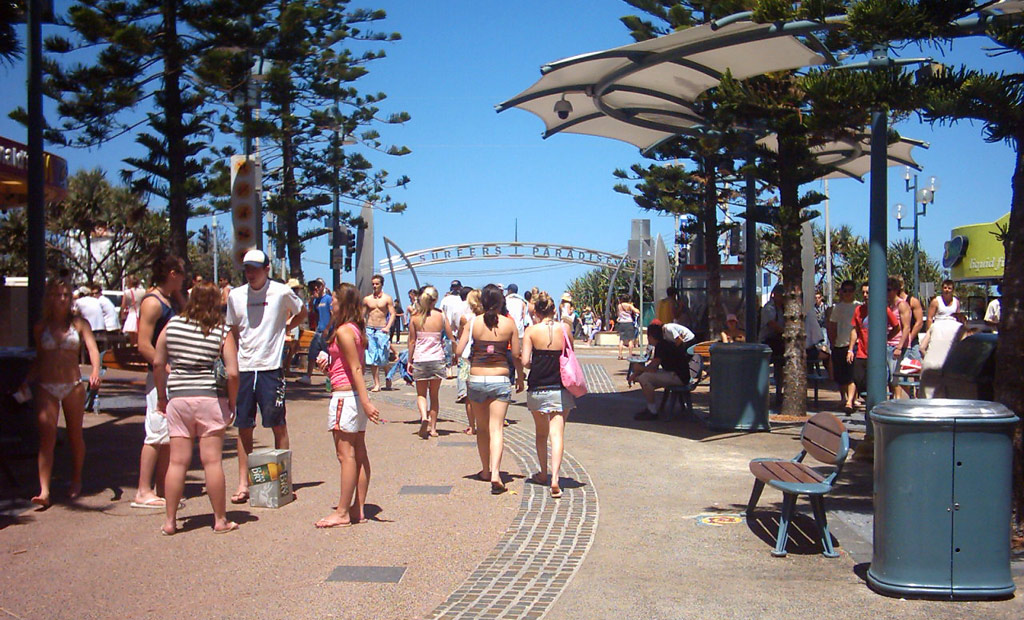
Cavill Mall in Surfers Paradise during Schoolies week.

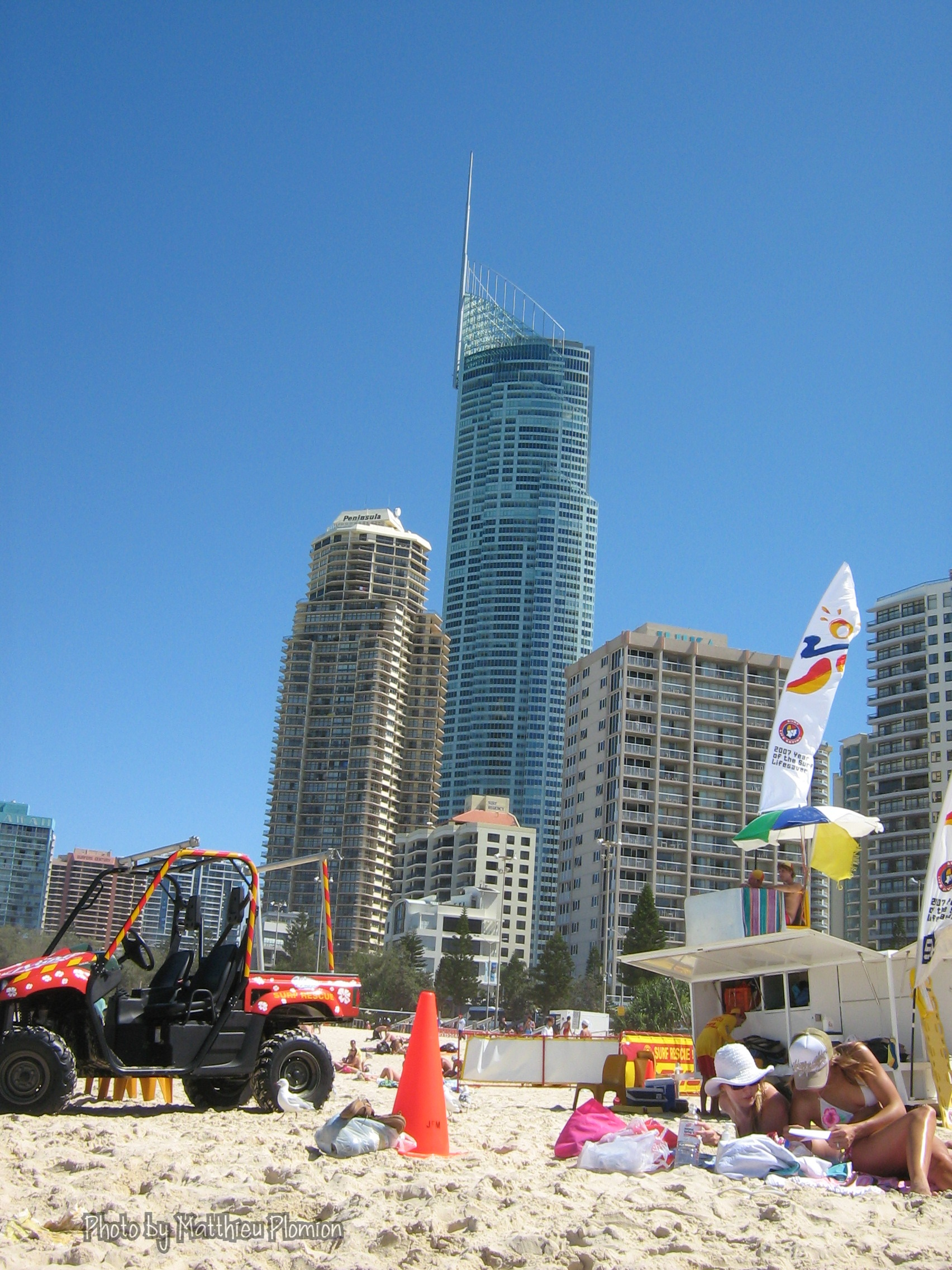
Surfers Paradise Beach with baywatch quad patrol and Q1 in background

Schoolies week is an Australian tradition of high-school graduates (also known as 'schoolies' or 'leavers') having week-long holidays following the end of their final exams in late November and early December. The tradition began on the Gold Coast in the early to mid 1980s and Surfers Paradise is still the largest single venue for the event. Prior to the 1980s, school leavers enjoyed one "muck up day" at the end of their Senior year, which often ended by meeting up at one of the old beer gardens in Surfers or Broadbeach. Official Schoolies events on the Gold Coast are drug-free and alcohol-free events held on the beach. The events often include concerts and parties.

The event is often seen as a rite of passage for graduating students and a transitional period from youth to adulthood. It is constantly criticised as promoting teen sex and under age drinking/drug taking. The event also attracts over age and under age attendees that are referred to as 'toolies' and 'foolies'. It is estimated that around 40,000 teenagers travel to the Gold Coast for the Schoolies event every year. A dedicated Schoolies event zone, featuring live music and youth-themed activities, is established each year on Surfers Paradise Beach in order to provide a safe, fun environment for school leavers. The area is monitored for exclusive use of current Year 12 school leavers. Schoolies Hub Beach area opens nightly from 7pm.

Volunteers in bright orange vests are the Schoolies Support Team who provide practical support and advice. Recharge Zones are located close to the Schoolies Hub to provide a safe place to keep hydrated with free water available.

== Sport and recreation ==
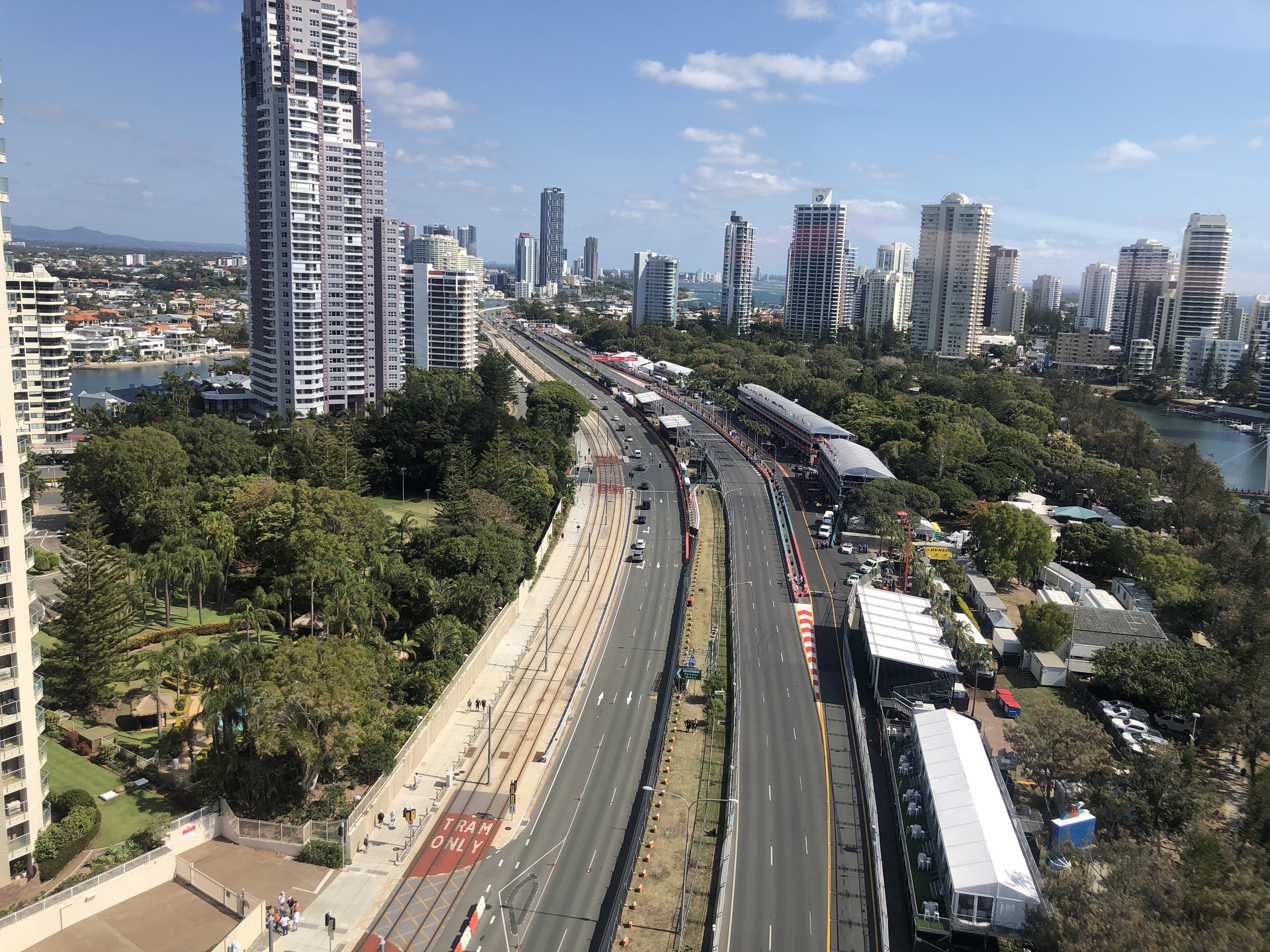
An aerial view of the Surfers Paradise Street Circuit, which hosts the Gold Coast 500 every October.

A number of well-known sporting teams represent the local area. At national level representing the Gold Coast include National Rugby League club, the Gold Coast Titans and Australian Football League team, the Gold Coast Suns. Additionally, clubs and teams based in Surfers Paradise include Australian Shooting Academy, Surfers Paradise Rowing Club, Surfers Paradise Apollo Soccer Club, Surfers Paradise Rugby Union Club, Surfers Paradise Triathlon Club, Surfers Paradise Cricket Club, Surfers Paradise Golf Club, Surfers Paradise Surf Life Saving Club and Surfers Paradise Baseball Club.

== Education ==
Surfers Paradise State School is a government primary (Preparatory to Year 6) school for boys and girls at 42 St Andrews Avenue on the Isle of Capri (28.0119°S 153.4207°E). In 2018, the school had an enrolment of 658 students with 50 teachers (44 full-time equivalent) and 28 non-teaching staff (20 full-time equivalent). It includes a special education program and an intensive English language program.

There are no government secondary schools in Surfers Paradise. The nearest government secondary schools are Keebra Park State High School in neighboring Southport to the north-west and Benowa State High School in Benowa to the west.

Gold Coast Learning Centre is a continuing education provider with classes in general English, IELTS, TESOL, business, accounting, management, marketing, workplace health and safety, and human resources.

English in Paradise, an English language school and international college that has been operating since 2001.

Holmes Institute, an integrated multi-sector private provider of education. The institute consists of a faculty of Vocational Education and Training, a faculty of Higher Education, a School of Secondary Education and an English Language Centres at each location, including Surfers Paradise.

== Rankings ==
Surfers Paradise Beach is regarded as one of the best beaches on the east coast of Australia and has been recognized with numerous domestic and international awards:

- Surfers Paradise beach was voted as one of the best beaches in the world by the American Travel Channel.
- Surfers Paradise beach was judged Queensland's Cleanest Beach in 2006 by the Keep Australia Beautiful Council.

== Transport ==
The precinct is serviced by two modes of public transport which are Kinetic Gold Coast's bus services and the G:link light rail service. Kinetic operates several bus routes which connect the suburb with the western parts of the city. The G:link runs in a north–south direction.

=== G:link ===
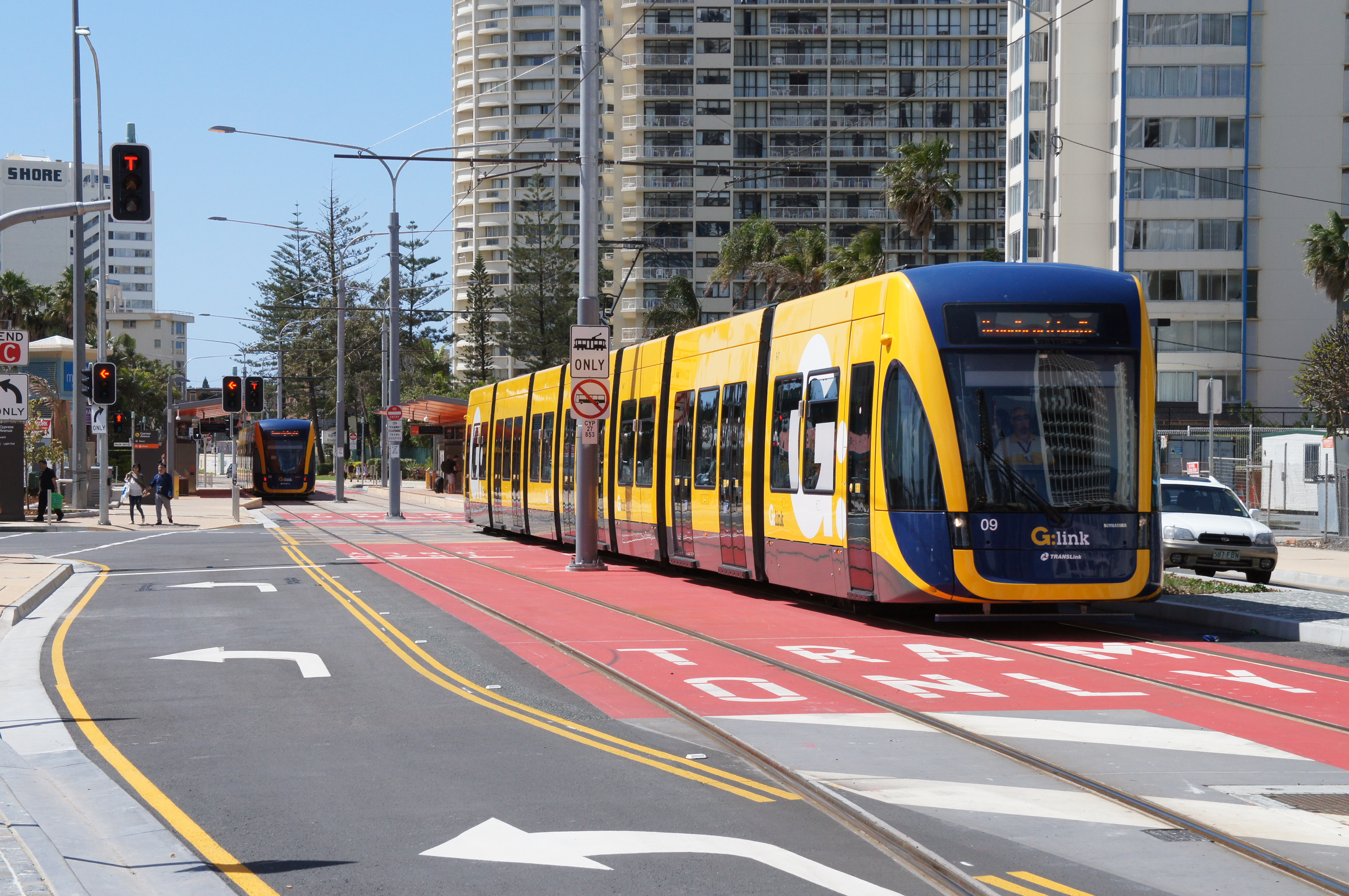
G:link trams at Cypress Avenue station

The G:link light rail system has five stations through the precinct.

Northcliffe station lies on the southern end of Surfers Paradise Boulevard, near the intersection of the Gold Coast Highway. The station services Northcliffe Surf Lifesaving Club and the Northcliffe Beach. Surfers Paradise station is located on Surfers Paradise Boulevard between Clifford Street and Hamilton Avenue. Notably, it is the closest station to the Q1. Cavill Avenue station lies on Surfers Paradise Boulevard between Cavill Avenue and Elkhorn Avenue. It is the closest station to Cavill Avenue, considered to be the heart of the precinct. Cypress Avenue station lies on Surfers Paradise Boulevard between Cypress Avenue and Palm Avenue. It is the closest station to Funtime amusement park. The station provides bus connections to Nerang railway station. Surfers Paradise North station is located on the north side of the intersection of Surfers Paradise Boulevard and Ocean Avenue.

== Climate ==
As a popular destination for beach-goers, Surfers Paradise is noted for its relatively steady warm climate throughout the year. Temperatures recorded at the nearest active weather station, Gold Coast Seaway, are milder than Brisbane in summer and warmer in winter. Extreme temperatures at the station have ranged from 40.5 °C (104.9 °F) on 22 February 2004 to 2.5 °C (36.5 °F) on 19 July 2007. The average temperature of the sea ranges from 21.5 °C (70.7 °F) in July and August to 27.1 °C (80.8 °F) in February.

Climate data for Gold Coast Seaway (27º56'24"S, 153º25'48"E, 3 m AMSL) (1992–2024 normals and extremes)
Month	Jan	Feb	Mar	Apr	May	Jun	Jul	Aug	Sep	Oct	Nov	Dec	Year
Record high °C (°F)	38.5 (101.3)	40.5 (104.9)	36.3 (97.3)	33.3 (91.9)	29.4 (84.9)	27.1 (80.8)	28.9 (84.0)	32.4 (90.3)	33.0 (91.4)	36.8 (98.2)	35.5 (95.9)	39.4 (102.9)	40.5 (104.9)
Mean daily maximum °C (°F)	28.8 (83.8)	28.7 (83.7)	28.0 (82.4)	26.0 (78.8)	23.6 (74.5)	21.5 (70.7)	21.3 (70.3)	22.2 (72.0)	24.0 (75.2)	25.4 (77.7)	26.8 (80.2)	28.0 (82.4)	25.4 (77.6)
Mean daily minimum °C (°F)	21.9 (71.4)	21.8 (71.2)	20.9 (69.6)	18.3 (64.9)	15.4 (59.7)	13.1 (55.6)	12.1 (53.8)	12.5 (54.5)	14.9 (58.8)	17.0 (62.6)	18.9 (66.0)	20.5 (68.9)	17.3 (63.1)
Record low °C (°F)	16.7 (62.1)	17.2 (63.0)	13.4 (56.1)	8.9 (48.0)	6.6 (43.9)	3.8 (38.8)	2.5 (36.5)	4.2 (39.6)	7.9 (46.2)	9.4 (48.9)	8.2 (46.8)	14.7 (58.5)	2.5 (36.5)
Average precipitation mm (inches)	138.8 (5.46)	187.3 (7.37)	155.7 (6.13)	118.4 (4.66)	103.2 (4.06)	101.3 (3.99)	50.9 (2.00)	51.0 (2.01)	43.4 (1.71)	88.3 (3.48)	109.4 (4.31)	138.5 (5.45)	1,287 (50.67)
Average precipitation days (≥ 1.0 mm)	9.2	10.4	11.2	8.9	8.5	6.7	5.4	4.3	5.3	6.5	7.8	9.0	93.2
Average relative humidity (%)	70	70	68	65	62	58	55	56	62	66	68	69	64
Average dew point °C (°F)	20.5 (68.9)	20.7 (69.3)	19.3 (66.7)	16.7 (62.1)	13.8 (56.8)	11.0 (51.8)	9.8 (49.6)	10.4 (50.7)	13.2 (55.8)	15.5 (59.9)	17.3 (63.1)	18.9 (66.0)	15.6 (60.1)
Source: Bureau of Meteorology (1992–2024 normals and extremes)

Historical population
Year	Pop.	±%
2006	18,501	—
2011	19,668	+6.3%
2016	23,689	+20.4%

== In popular culture ==
As an iconic holiday destination, Surfers Paradise has been namechecked in numerous popular Australian songs and other works including:

- The Australian Crawl song "The Boys Light Up" also mentions the line "That flat in Surfers Paradise, with the ocean view".
- The Redgum song "Gladstone Pier", from their 1984 album Frontline, includes the line "From Surfers up to Townsville..."
- The Kev Carmody song "Elly" mentions the line "She gazed up at the tall glass and concrete walls at Main Street Surfers Paradise".
- Pop singer Cody Simpson released an album titled Surfers Paradise as a tribute to his hometown.
- American rapper Donald Glover, known under his stage name "Childish Gambino", referenced the Gold Coast in his 2014 song "Retro": "down under, surfin' on the Gold Coast".
- The region is part of the open world environment of the 2016 racing video game Forza Horizon 3 and is the location of the Horizon Surfers Paradise Festival.
