= Surfers Paradise Hotel =

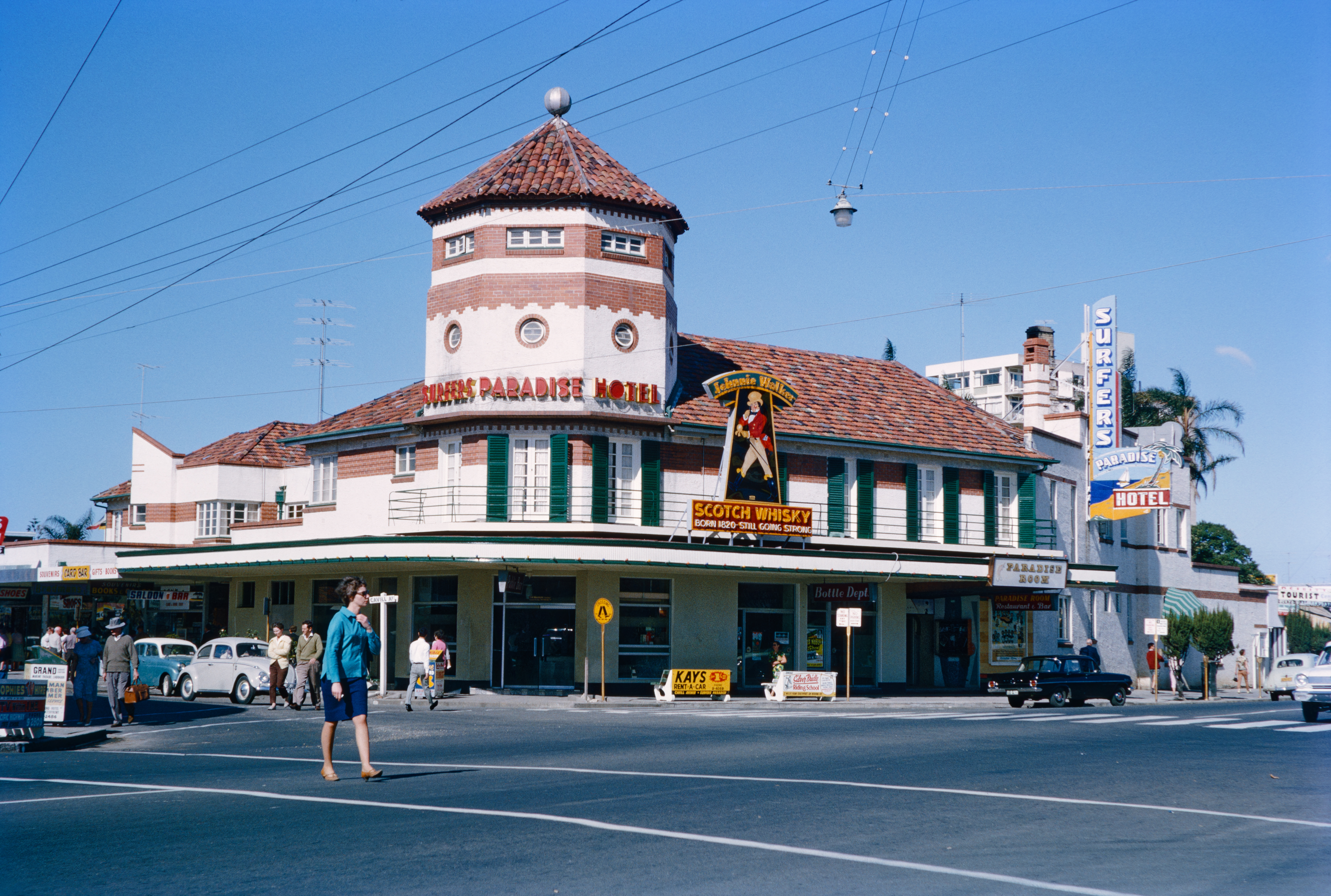
Surfers Paradise Hotel, 1965

The Surfers Paradise Hotel was the historic hotel that led to the development of Surfers Paradise in Queensland, Australia.

== History ==
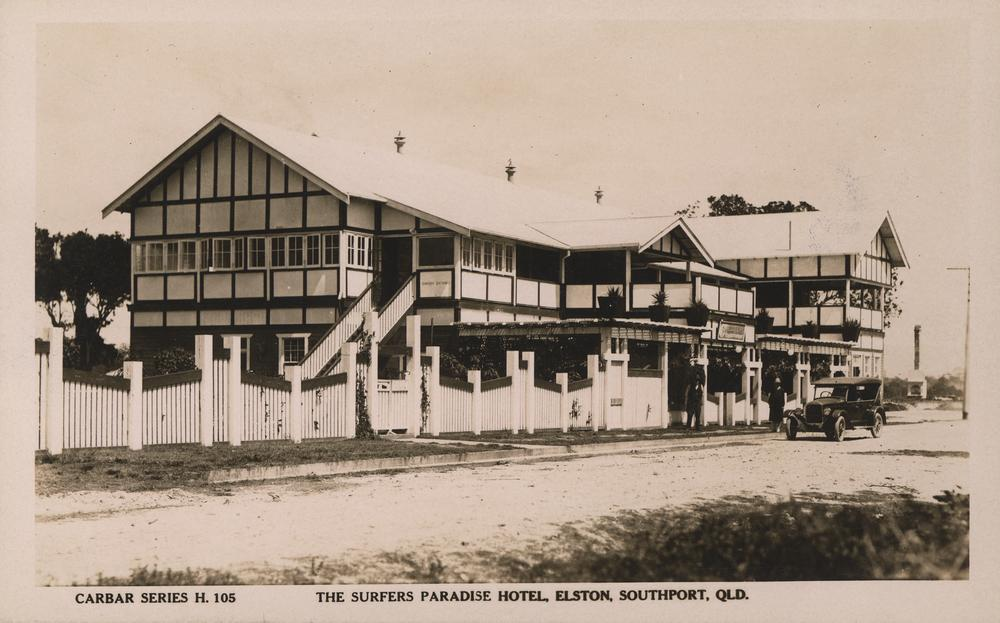
Hotel in 1928

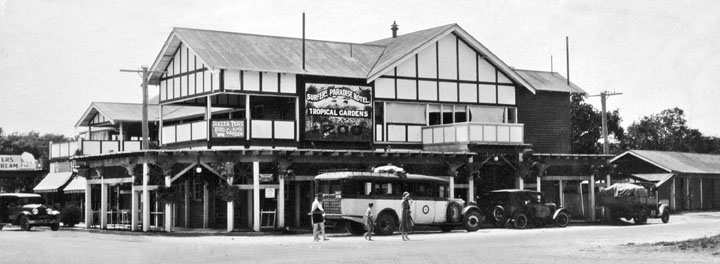
Hotel in 1930

During the 1920s, the Australian hotelier Jim Cavill (born James Freeman Cavill) purchased 10 acres of land in Elston (now Surfers Paradise). The land has previously been developed by previous owners but 1925 marked the openings of the Jubilee Bridge and the South Coast Road, opening up the area to a new flow of driving tourists. That year (or in 1928), Jim Cavill opened the Surfers Paradise Hotel, a 16-bedroom hotel located on the intersection of the South Coast Road and the old coach track. Two other hotels opened at the same time. The flow of tourism gave a new economic beat to the area and Elston quickly became a fully-fledged city.

The hotel included a private zoo.

Jim Cavill founded the Surfers Paradise Life Saving Club and the Surfers Paradise Progress Association in 1929.

In December 1933, Jim Cavill lobbied with locals to rename the city Elston to Surfers Paradise. In July 1936, the timber-built hotel burned down. All of the animals in the zoo were saved, except for the goldfish. The hotel was entirely rebuilt in bricks the following year, reopening in September 1937 with telephones in every room.

The street where the hotel stands was renamed Cavill Avenue in 1945.

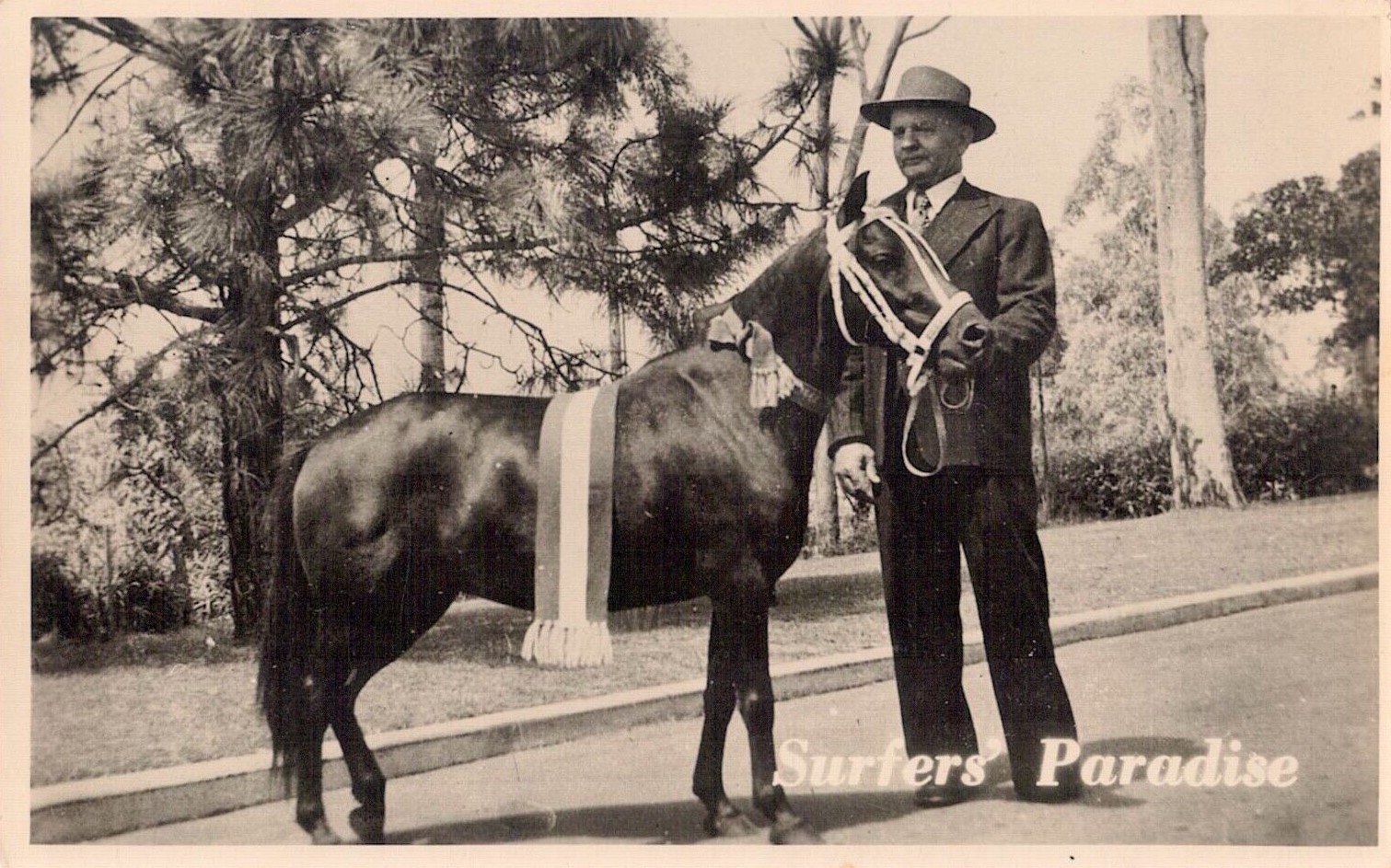
Topsy the talking horse, Surfers Paradise Hotel, 1950s

Topsy the Talking Horse was a popular feature of the zoo in the 1940s and 1950s. Topsy would answer questions asked by the audience by nodding and shaking her head and tapping numeric answers with her hoof. Her trainer was Tom Dennison. In 1954, Topsy was taken to Government House in Brisbane to perform for Queen Elizabeth and Prince Philip during their royal tour of Australia in 1954.

The hotel was demolished in 1983 to make way for the Paradise Centre.
