= Cavill Avenue =

Street in Surfers Paradise, Queensland

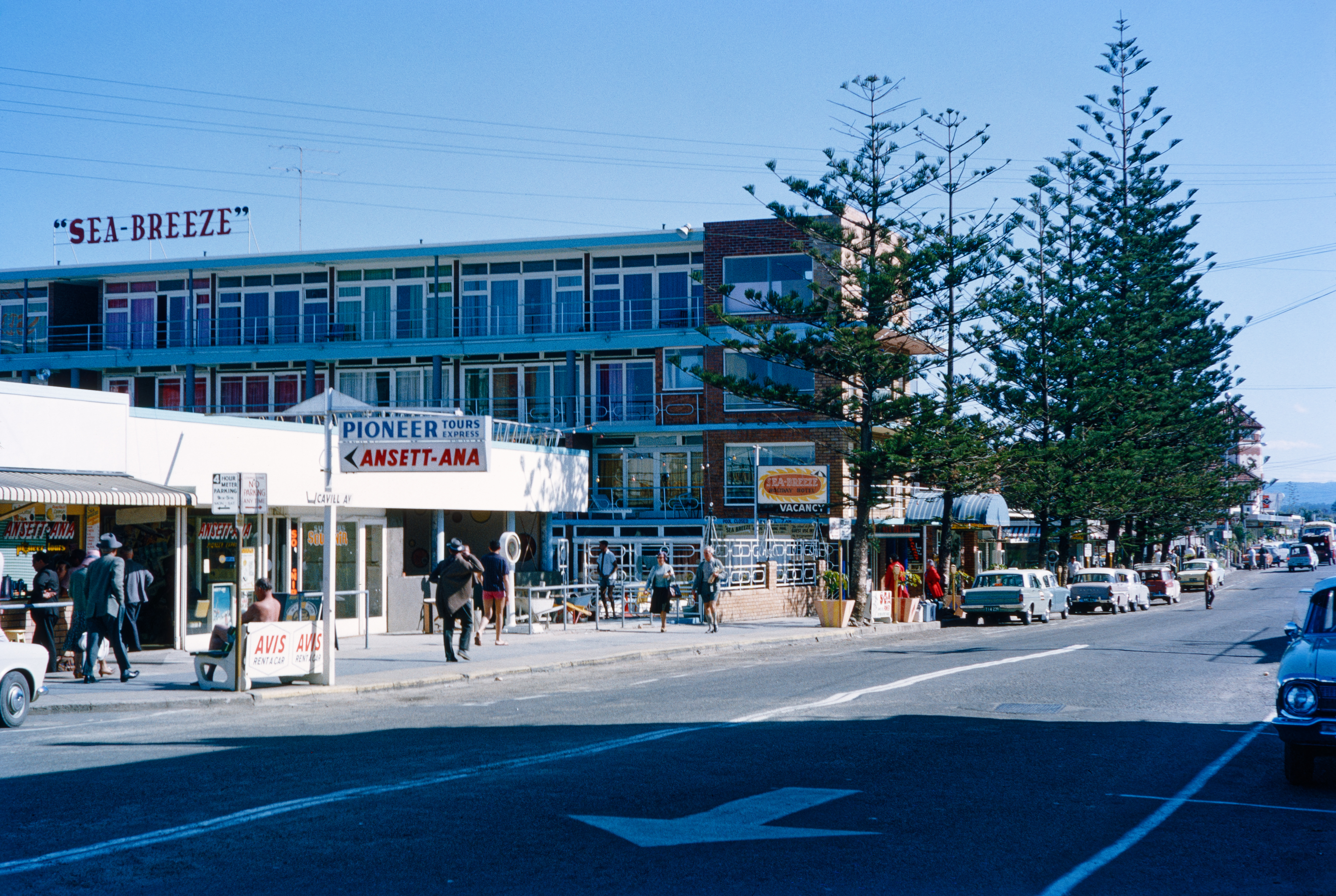
Cavill Avenue, Surfers Paradise with the Seabreeze Hotel in the background, July 1965

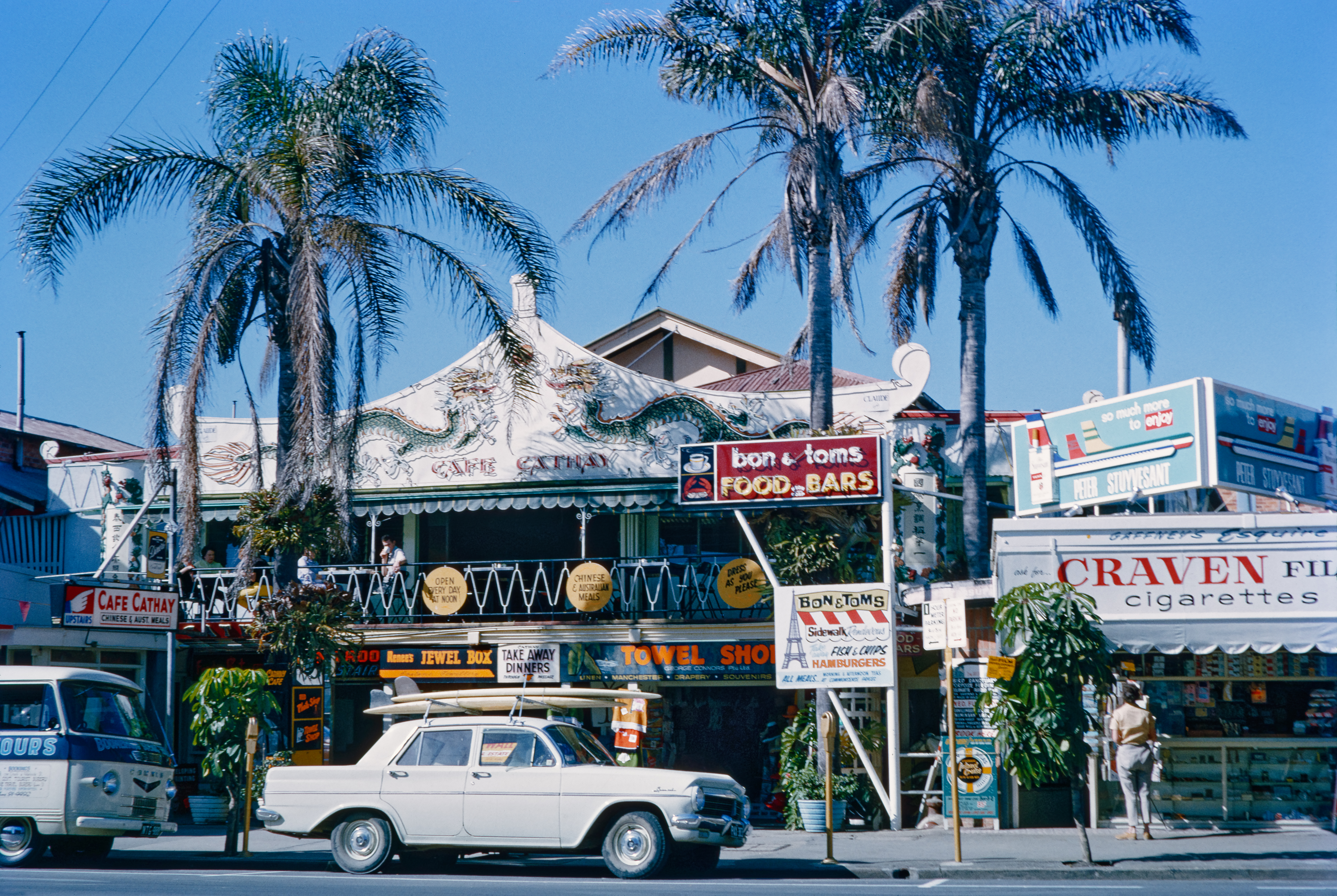
Cavill Avenue, Surfers Paradise, July 1965

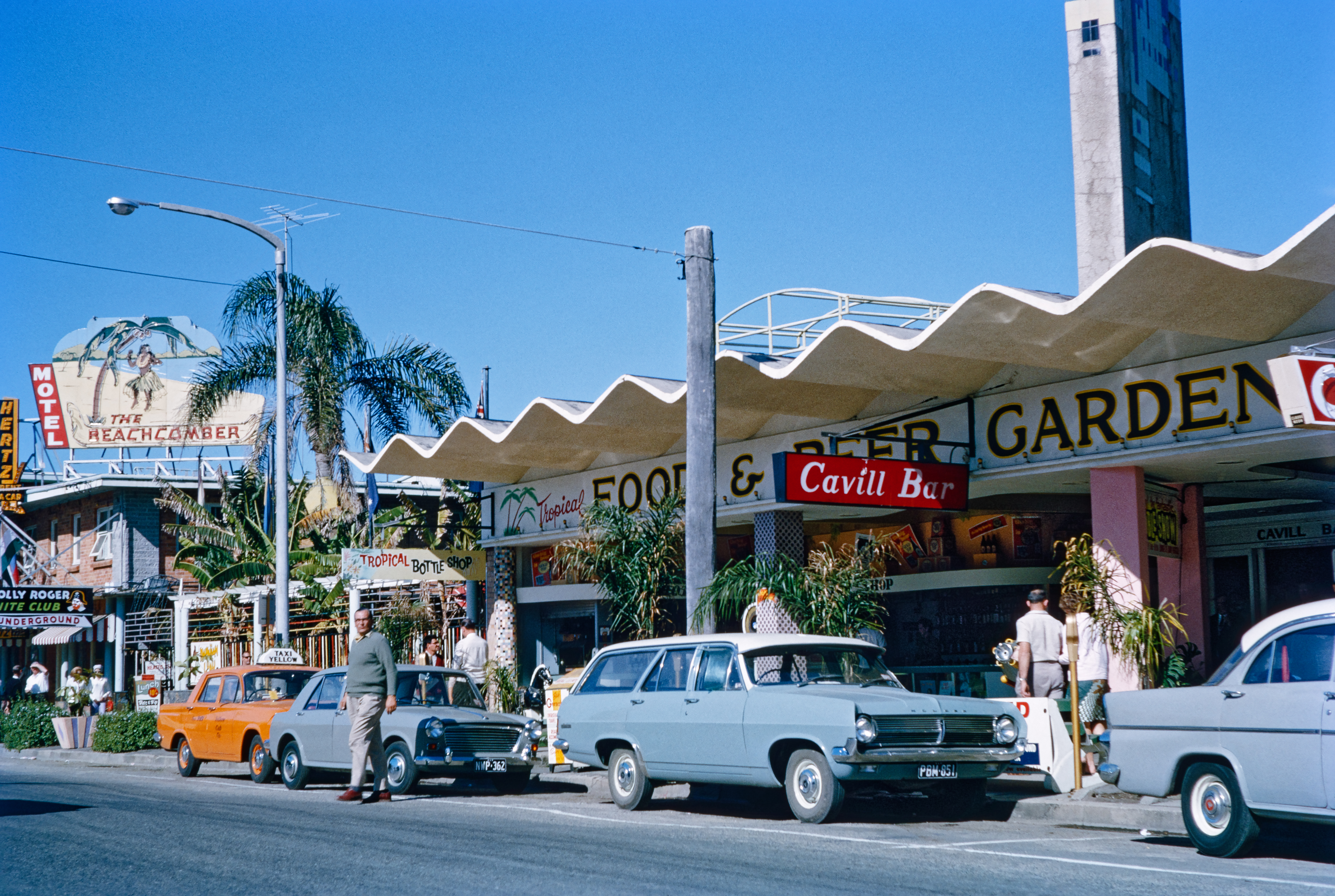
Views of Cavill Avenue shops with Beachcomber Motel in the background, Surfers Paradise, July 1965

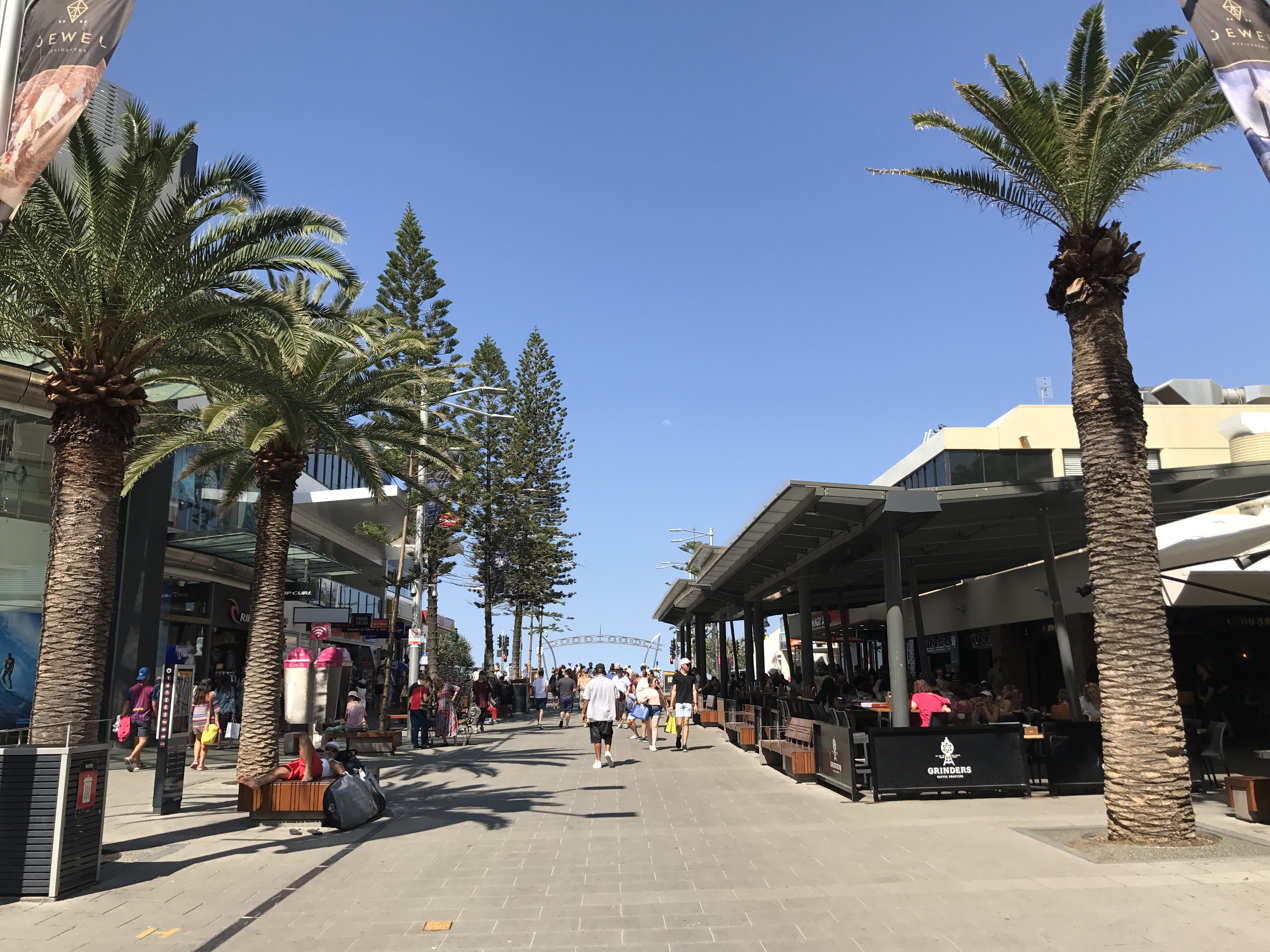
Pedestrian mall in 2017

Cavill Avenue is a street and a pedestrian mall in Surfers Paradise, Gold Coast, Queensland, Australia. It is in the heart of the Surfers Paradise shopping and entertainment district. It was named in honour of the man credited as the founder of Surfers Paradise, James Cavill, known as Jim Cavill.

== History ==
In 1887, German immigrant Johann Meyer operated a ferry across the Nerang River. From Southport, travellers would follow the Meyer's Ferry Road (now Ferry Road) to a spit of land that created a narrow point in the river (28.0011°S 153.4247°E) (the narrow spit is no longer in existence due to changes in the river and the creation of Chevron Island but is in the vicinity of the Gold Coast Arts Centre). From that point, Meyer's ferry would take the travellers across the river to Meyer's Ferry Road at Elston (as Surfers Paradise was then known) along which the travellers would walk to the surf beach. Businesses established along Meyer's Ferry Road at Elston which created the main street of Surfers Paradise now known as Cavill Avenue. Although the surf beaches of Elston were a popular destination, the lack of road access limited the extent of residential and commercial development.

It was not until 1925, when the Jubilee Bridge was built across the Nerang River between Southport and Main Beach, that Surfers Paradise was opened up for tourism and associated development. During the same period Jim Cavill built the Surfers Paradise Hotel on the south eastern corner of Ferry Road and the South Coast Road.

In 1945, in response to a letter from Mr. E Shersby to name streets after local pioneers, the Southport Town Council decided to rename the section of Ferry Road east of the Nerang River, and in front of the Surfers Paradise Hotel, in honour of Jim Cavill. It was decided to name the section of Ferry Road west of the Nerang River after Johann Meyer.

== Geography ==
Between the Surfers Paradise Beach and Orchid Avenue, Cavill Avenue is a pedestrian mall. The Centro Surfers Paradise is a major shopping centre on pedestrian section of Cavill Avenue. The Circle on Cavill is the second shopping centre on the street, located at the western end of the road, near the Gold Coast Highway.

Located near the intersection of Surfers Paradise Boulevard and Cavill Avenue is the G:link Cavill Avenue Station. The G:link is the Gold Coast's light rail system connecting Broadbeach with Helensvale via Surfers Paradise, Main Beach, Southport, Gold Coast University Hospital, Parkwood and Helensvale.

The Soul is a 243 m tall skyscraper and the second tallest skyscraper on the Gold Coast behind Q1. The building is situated on the Esplanade just to the north of Cavill Avenue. At the river end of the street are the two towers of Circle on Cavill.

== Events ==
The mall is the centre of the annual Schoolies celebrations. According to crime statistics the mall is an alcohol fueled violence hotspot.

== See also ==
- List of red-light districts
