= Jim Cavill =

Australian businessman

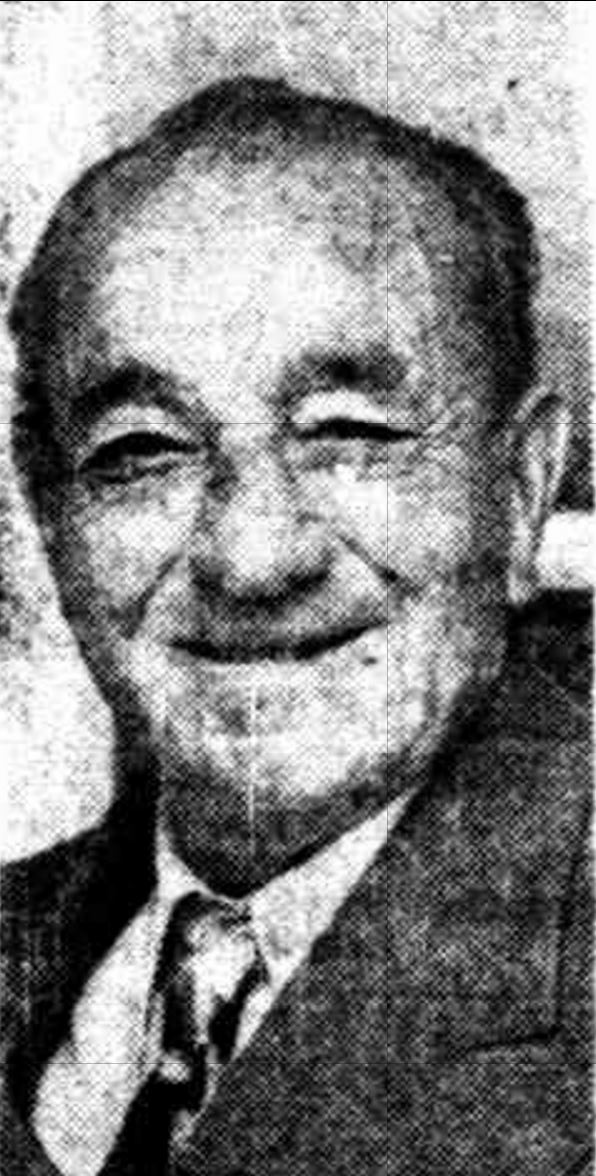
Jim Cavill, 1951

James Freeman Cavill (c.1862 –1952 in Surfers Paradise, Queensland) a Brisbane hotelier, was one of the pioneers of the Gold Coast, Australia.

== Early life ==
Information about his early life is sketchy as he told a number of conflicting stories, which cannot be validated from official records. He often claimed to be born in Carlton, Melbourne but also claimed to be born in Sydney as the son of Frederick Cavill (1839–1927), a champion swimmer, and Maria Rhodes a cousin of Cecil Rhodes.

== Business life ==
From 1903 to 1913, Jim Cavill was a hairdresser with premises in Edward Street, Brisbane. Although an employer himself, he campaigned for hairdressers to have reduced working hours, similar to shop and factory workers.

In 1917, Jim Cavill was the licensee of the Royal Exchange Hotel in Toowong, Brisbane.

Many years after Johan Meyer's initial entrepreneurial endeavours failed, James Cavill purchased 25 acres (101,000 m^{2}) of land in the Elston subdivision. He built a sixteen-room timber hotel, which he named the Surfers Paradise Hotel.

With the construction of the new hotel, postal services were revived and refreshments and accommodation were provided for visitors to the area. James Cavill was heavily involved in the early promotion of Elston, and lobbied hard for the name, which was in common use, to be changed to Surfers Paradise (the same as his hotel). The area was officially renamed Surfers Paradise in October 1933.

On the morning of 6 July 1936, the Surfers Paradise Hotel was destroyed by fire and a new palatial brick hotel, which officially opened on Friday 24 September 1937, was erected in its place.

The Elston area was slow to take off, but when it finally did, it was labelled the Gold Coast in newspaper reports and in 1958 it became the official name for the town.

Cavill Avenue, and its extension, the Cavill mall, in Surfers Paradise were named in honour of James 'Jim' Cavill; previously it had been named Meyer's Ferry Road or just Ferry Road.

Jim Cavill died at the Surfers Paradise Hotel on 5 March 1952 and was buried in the Southport cemetery.
