= Railway Hotel, Gympie =

Heritage-listed hotel in Gympie, Australia

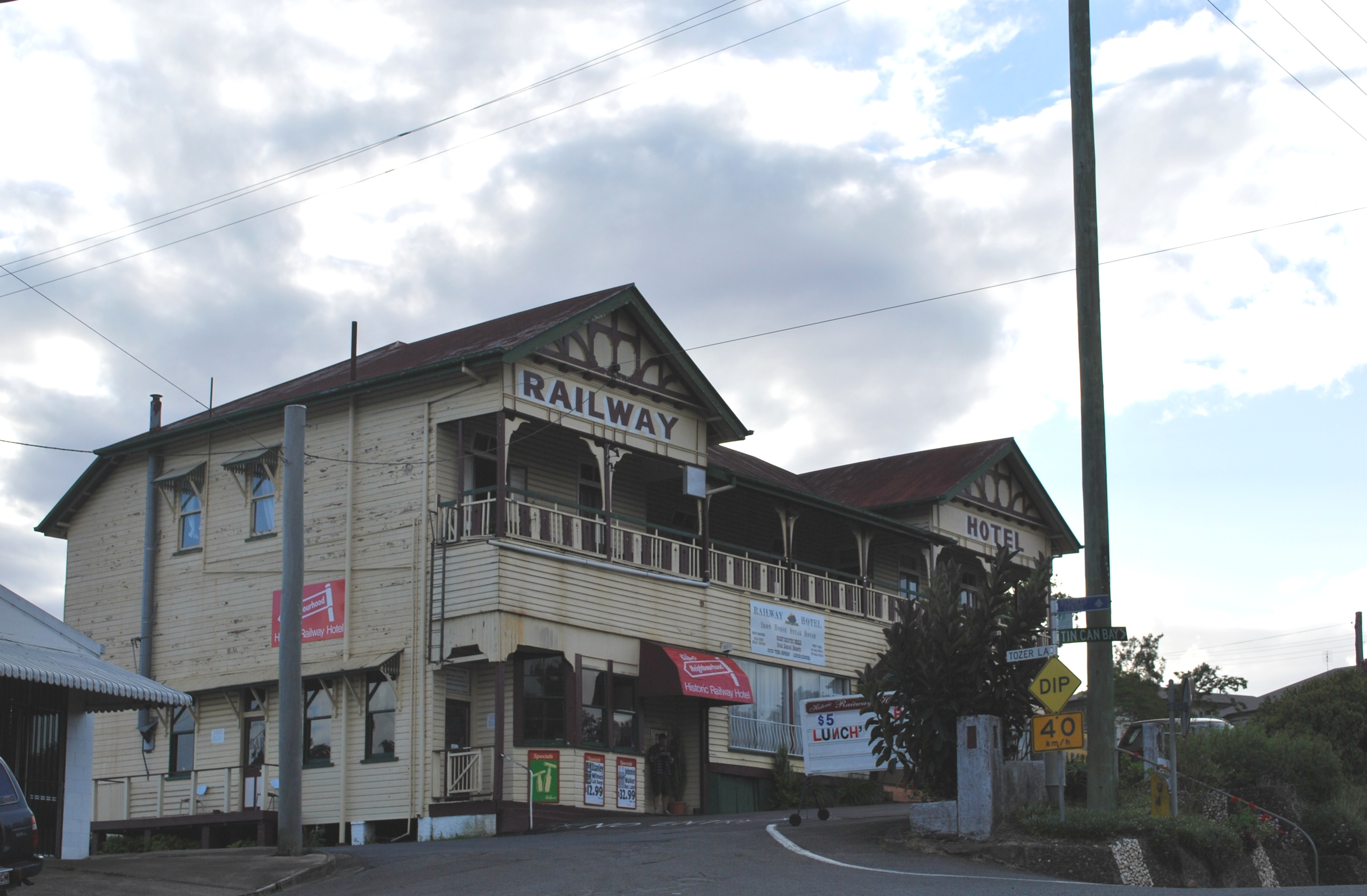
- Railway Hotel, 2010

- Location within Queensland Location within Australia
- 26.1887°S 152.6708°E
- Location: 1 Station Road, Gympie, Gympie Region, Queensland, Australia

History
- Design period: 1900–1914 (early 20th century)
- Built: 1915
- Built for: Charles Caston

Site notes
- Architect: Alexander Brown Wilson

Queensland Heritage Register
- Official name: Railway Hotel
- Type: state heritage (built)
- Designated: 12 June 2008
- Reference no.: 602540
- Significant period: Early 20th century (1900s–1910s)
- Significant components: bar, hotel / inn, dining room, kitchen/kitchen house, cellar
- Builders: J J Georges

Railway Hotel is a heritage-listed hotel at 1 Station Road, Gympie, Gympie Region, Queensland, Australia. It was designed by Alexander Brown Wilson and built in 1915 by J J Georges. It was added to the Queensland Heritage Register on 12 June 2008.

== History ==
The Railway Hotel at Gympie is a large, two-storeyed timber building constructed in 1915–1916 for owner Charles Caston. Designed by Brisbane architect AB Wilson, it replaced an earlier single-storey Railway Hotel erected in 1882 on the same site.

Gympie was established after the discovery of gold in the Mary River district in October 1867. The new goldfield put Queensland on the map as a significant gold producer, contributing much needed finances to the young colony. Thousands of people arrived at the Gympie goldfield in the months after the discovery and a fledgling settlement emerged.

The early makeshift structures of Gympie gradually gave way to more permanent and substantial public and private buildings. The township provided a ready market for local timbergetters and the growing number of agricultural producers in the surrounding district. By the end of the 1870s, an intensive phase of underground reef mining was underway, facilitated by the injection of capital into mining companies for machinery and employees. During 1881, mines began yielding large amounts of gold, marking a new era of wealth and prosperity for Gympie.

The 1880s were an important period of expansion for railways in Queensland, with new lines opening throughout the state. The economic importance of Gympie's mining industry was the key factor in the approval of the construction of the railway line between the sea port of Maryborough and Gympie. The line was officially opened in August 1881, and soon became the dominant transport artery for the movement of goods and people in and out of Gympie.

Gympie railway station, located between Tozer Hill and Caledonian Hill, was erected adjacent to land owned by Walter A Compigne, Gympie's first Clerk of Petty Sessions in 1868 and registrar of the Gympie District Court by 1874. In 1882 Compigne took advantage of this proximity to the station by constructing the Railway Hotel on his land.

As Queensland's railway system expanded, hotels joined other businesses in clustering around the rail stations. Use of the name "Railway Hotel" was common by the 1860s, a popular means of advertising proximity to the railway station. By the early twentieth century there were close to 70 "Railway Hotels" in Queensland.

Compigne did not conduct the Railway Hotel himself, preferring to lease it to licensees. Following his death in 1884 the property passed to his wife Mary Ann, who continued leasing out the Railway Hotel.

In 1888 construction of the North Coast railway commenced simultaneously from Brisbane and Gympie. The southward extension resulted in further land resumptions, with the allotment on which the Railway Hotel stood being reduced in size. In May 1888, tenders were called for the removal of the Railway Hotel, possibly to reposition the hotel following the resumption.

The Gympie-Brisbane rail line was opened in 1891, linking a coastal route from Brisbane to Bundaberg. The extended scope of services from Gympie railway station generated more activity around the railway precinct. In 1892 title to the Railway Hotel and adjoining land was transferred to Charles Caston, a second generation Gympie mining secretary. The Caston family maintained an interest in the hotel for over 60 years. Caston continued to lease out the Railway Hotel.

On the night of 1 February 1915, the Railway Hotel was almost totally destroyed by fire, except for some detached rooms at the rear. In May tenders were advertised for the construction of a new Railway Hotel, designed by Brisbane architect Alexander Brown Wilson. After working in the private practice of Colonial Architect, FDG Stanley, and studying in England, Wilson began his own architectural practice in Brisbane in 1884, maintaining a long and distinguished career until his retirement in 1928. He was responsible for buildings in Brisbane such as the Plough Inn at South Bank, Kinauld at Highgate Hill and Leckhampton at Kangaroo Point.

Gympie builder JJ Georges was awarded the contract for the construction of the new hotel in June 1915 and this was completed by February 1916 at a cost of £1980. The new hotel was a large two-storey timber building with first floor verandahs and a double gabled roof with a detached kitchen to the rear. Wilson's design responded to the requirements of a subtropical timber hotel, providing well ventilated rooms with high ceilings and guests quarters that opened onto front and rear verandahs. The interiors of the building were enhanced by the inclusion of pressed metal ceilings. The exterior of the hotel shared similarities with popular domestic architecture in its decorative treatment of the verandah and gables. Two earlier detached rooms were repositioned at the rear of the premises. Between 1916 and 1920 Charles Caston held the license to the hotel.

The building's elevated position on a rise overlooking the station made it a prominent landmark in the city.

The rebuilding of the Railway Hotel coincided with a substantial upgrading to the Gympie railway station between 1911 and 1915. Crew barracks for overnight accommodation were built in 1914. Other work included a new large station building, pedestrian subway, an underpass linking Station Road to Mellor Street and conversion of the platform into an island. In 1915, a large overbridge was built from the island platform linking Lady Mary Terrace and Station Road. The new bridge was a welcome development for the Railway Hotel, with pedestrians alighting from the overbridge directly in front of the building.

The opening of the Mary Valley railway to Brooloo in 1915 and the connection between Cairns and Brisbane in 1924 sent more goods and people through Gympie. The Gympie district was the largest producer of bananas in Australia in the 1920s and an important pineapple growing area. Fruit trains began operating from Gympie to Melbourne and in 1923 the Gympie Fruit Growers Co-operative Association erected premises opposite the station on Tozer Street. The Wide Bay Co-operative Dairy Company also was located on Tozer Street and in 1925 built one of Australia's largest butter factories. By 1927 one tenth of Queensland's milk production was from the Gympie district. The centrality of the railway precinct to Gympie's economy offered enhanced opportunities for the Railway Hotel to generate business.

In November 1928 newly formed Brisbane brewer Castlemaine Perkins Limited acquired an interest in the lease of the Railway Hotel from William English. The purchase of the leasehold by Castlemaine Perkins exemplified their practice of acquiring hotel freeholds and leases throughout Queensland. This process of vertical integration continued into the 1930s, ensuring the companies domination of the Queensland market.

A licensing inspection report from 1936 indicates the Railway Hotel's internal arrangement of space followed a layout typical of early twentieth century Queensland hotels. The first floor contained 12 guest bedrooms, a sitting room, one bathroom, two water closets and front and rear verandahs. On the ground floor were eight guest rooms, one sitting room, dining room, large kitchen, laundry, parlour, bar, and cellar. Four detached rooms at the rear of the premises were used by the publican and servants and a garage with space for two cars was available for guests. The Railway Hotel was a prosperous and well maintained place at this period. Used extensively by the travelling public and commercial travellers the hotel averaged fifty guests a week, mostly persons of "good character".

Castlemaine Perkins maintained an interest in the hotel until 1945, through leases and sub-leases to and from publicans. In 1953 the Caston family ended their association with the Railway Hotel and since that time a number of owners and publications have been involved in its management.

The public bar was enlarged in 1966, by incorporating the parlour bar at the far end from the street entrance. The dining room has been extended into the front sitting room and kitchen capacity has been expanded by widening the original walkway. The garage and detached rooms have been removed and in recent years a beer garden has been added at the rear of the building.

With the electrification of the North Coast railway line in 1989, a new railway station for Gympie was built east of the town. Since 1998, the original Gympie railway station has become an important tourist attraction for the city with the Mary Valley Heritage Railway operating steam train excursions through the Mary Valley. The Railway Hotel continues its role of providing drink, food and lodgings for visitors and locals. A regular local clientele drink at the public bar and a number of long-term residents occupy rooms on the first floor. Memorabilia throughout the building celebrates the hotel's long association with the railway.

== Description ==
A prominent landmark standing on one of Gympie's hilltops, the Railway Hotel is a two-storeyed timber building on the corner of Station Road and Tozer Lane, Gympie. From this elevated site, adjacent to the former Gympie railway station, the hotel affords expansive views across Gympie and surrounding districts. A timber footbridge connects the hotel and the railway station.

The Railway Hotel is a large rectangular building sheltered by a hipped roof clad with corrugated iron sheeting. The building faces northeast, is timber-framed, clad with chamferboards and stands on brick and concrete stumps on a sloping site. The front elevation is dominated by projecting end gable bays carrying panels with painted lettering RAILWAY (east bay) and HOTEL (west bay) below decorative battened, pressed metal gable infills. Verandahs to each level have weatherboard valances. The verandah to the first floor has stop- chamfered timber posts with long, elegant curved brackets and dowel and decorative panel balustrading. On the ground floor enclosed verandahs flank the main entrance. Double-hung sash windows shaded by timber awnings punctuate the side elevations.

The ground floor elevation is asymmetrical with an off-centre main entrance sheltered by a projecting gable roof crowned at the apex by a metal scroll finial. A set of low tiled concrete stairs rises to the timber floored entrance porch which is framed by oversized decorative brackets matching the pattern of the brackets to first floor verandah posts. A four-panelled timber entrance door with glazed sidelights and fanlights opens into the vestibule and a side door to the left opens onto the former sitting room off the dining room. A later metal ramp runs along the front from the west to alight at the porch. The public bar is accommodated within the east side of the building and is entered through doorways to the northeast recessed to each side of a bay window. The awning sheltering one of these entrances is recent. Northwest of the public bar, two low timber doors open from carpark level into the concrete and brick basement cellar.

The ground floor accommodates the entrance vestibule, manager's office and private quarters, dining room and former sitting room, and public bar. The ground floor plan works off the entrance vestibule from which a fine timber stair rises to the guest accommodation on the first floor. From the vestibule, the dining room is entered to the left and the manager's quarters/office to the right. The vestibule runs through to the rear verandah which accommodates toilets at each end. Partitions to the ground floor rooms are post and rail construction lined with vertical tongue and groove boards. All the public rooms, including the bay window space in the public bar, have decorative pressed metal ceilings, ceiling roses and cornices except the rear section of the public bar where the ceiling is lined with tongue and groove timber boards.

The dining room opens onto the service corridor to the rear, to the public bar through a door at the far east side of the room and receives service from the bar through an open hatch. The former lounge to the northeast of the dining room is enclosed with aluminium sliding doors and accommodates a billiard table.

The public bar is refurbished and incorporates the former parlour bar to the southeast. There is evidence of earlier partitions now removed and a window opening now infilled with vertical timber boards. Murals decorating the upper walls and bar fittings are recent.

The first floor is organised about a central corridor which is punctuated by arched openings and accommodates 12 bedrooms, a recreation room and two storage cupboards. Verandahs run to the front and rear, the narrow rear verandah accommodating bathrooms and toilets at each end. Short transverse corridors connect front and rear verandahs. The bedrooms open onto the corridor and the verandahs four- panel timber doors with fixed fretwork transom windows open onto the corridor and French windows with pivoting glazed fanlights open onto the verandahs. The partitions are of post and rail construction lined with vertical timber boards. The external walls are clad with chamferboards. The ceilings are lined with tongue and groove boards and have decorative metal ceiling roses. Double-hung sash windows terminate each end of the corridor and are installed in the end rooms.

Earlier gas light pipes and fittings remain to the upper and lower rear verandahs. Original door and window joinery and hardware remain throughout the building. The building has timber floors throughout except for the upper verandahs which are now sheeted with a thick fibre cement board. Fibre cement sheeting encloses the bathrooms to the northwest and the enclosed services corridor of the ground floor rear verandah.

A timber framed two-roomed rectangular building clad with chamferboards (some beaded to the interior), the kitchen/laundry wing stands to the rear of the main building. It is reached from the rear ground floor verandah through an enclosed service corridor and storage area. The roof to the kitchen/laundry is clad with corrugated metal sheeting with a gable to the north end and a hip to the south. A two- sided fireplace with a tall brick chimney stands to the centre. The fireplace is no longer operable and accommodates a contemporary stove within the north end. The kitchen fit-out is recent including the plasterboard lining. The laundry ceiling is lined with timber boards and has a decorative metal ceiling rose; the laundry walls are unlined.

A modern beer garden sheltered by a low pitched skillion roof stands to the northwest of the kitchen/laundry. This is not considered to be of cultural heritage significance.

A bitumen carpark slopes uphill towards the railway line forming a forecourt to the building. A concrete fence runs along the northeast side of the carpark from which terraced garden beds retained by battered stone and concrete walls fall to Station Road. The beds are planted with a range of shrubs and a set of concrete stairs rises within them.

== Heritage listing ==
Railway Hotel was listed on the Queensland Heritage Register on 12 June 2008 having satisfied the following criteria.

The place is important in demonstrating the evolution or pattern of Queensland's history.

The Railway Hotel at Gympie, constructed in 1915 on a site associated with a hotel since 1882, is important in demonstrating a significant pattern of urban development from the 1860s: the clustering of commercial premises in the vicinity of railway stations. The Railway Hotel at Gympie is an excellent illustration of this trend. The connectivity between the hotel and the railway station, due both to the close proximity and to the footbridge that emerges from the station in front of the hotel, is a particularly good illustration of the interdependence of commercial places (including hotels) and railways in moving and accommodating goods and people in Queensland prior to developments in road transportation. The hotel occupies a prominent and easily accessible position in relation to the former Gympie Railway Station, and for decades has offered accommodation to rail travellers and the provision of drink and food for visitors and locals.

The construction of the new Railway Hotel in 1915–1916 is associated with a period of significant growth in Gympie, during which services and facilities at Gympie Railway Station and precinct were expanded, closely linked to the increasing economic importance of the district's dairy and fruit industries.

The place is important in demonstrating the principal characteristics of a particular class of cultural places.

Although some interior alterations, especially on the ground floor which contains the public spaces, can be expected in hotels that have sustained their function through many decades, the Railway Hotel at Gympie retains a high degree of integrity and intactness. It remains important in illustrating the principal characteristics of a large timber hotel of the early twentieth century, expressed in its form, exterior detail, and internal layout, fittings, fixtures and decorative detailing. High ceilings and verandahs illustrate a response to sub-tropical Queensland conditions, while the decorative elements on the verandah and gables reveal the influence of domestic forms on hotel architecture at this period. Internally, the place retains an early and fine timber staircase; extensive use of decorative pressed metal ceilings, ceiling roses and cornices in the public rooms on the ground floor; original door and window joinery and hardware; and a highly intact upper floor with early bedrooms opening off a central corridor. Earlier gas light pipes and fittings remain to the upper and lower rear veranda's.

The place is important because of its aesthetic significance.

Situated on one of Gympie's hills, the Railway Hotel is a prominent landmark in Gympie. The building's position overlooking the train station and next to the platform footbridge reinforces its connectivity to the railway while making a strong aesthetic contribution to the railway precinct and to the Gympie townscape.
