= Kinkabool =

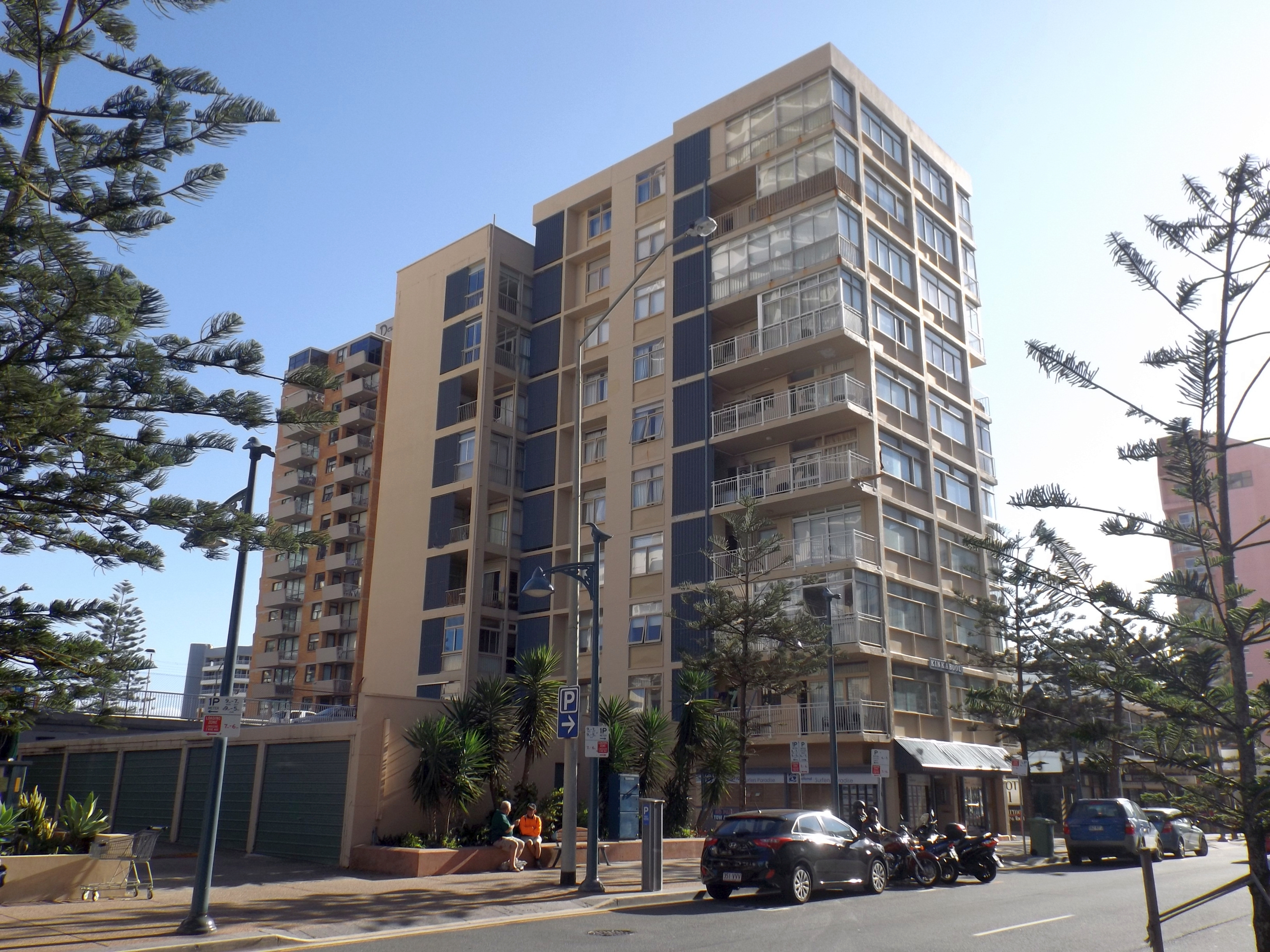
- Building in 2015

- Location within Queensland Location within Australia
- 28.0033°S 153.4295°E
- Location: 32–34 Hanlan Street, Surfers Paradise, Queensland, Australia

History
- Design period: 1940s–1960s (post-World War II)
- Built: 1959–1960

Site notes
- Height: 27 metres (89 ft)
- Architect(s): John M. Morton of Lund Hutton Newell Black & Paulsen
- Architectural style: Modernism

Queensland Heritage Register
- Official name: Kinkabool
- Type: state heritage (built)
- Designated: 5 February 2009
- Reference no.: 601477
- Significant period: 1959–1970
- Significant components: shop/s, car park, foyer – entrance, elevator, basement / sub-floor, views from, residential accommodation – home unit/s, views to
- Builders: J D Booker Constructions (Gold Coast) Pty Ltd

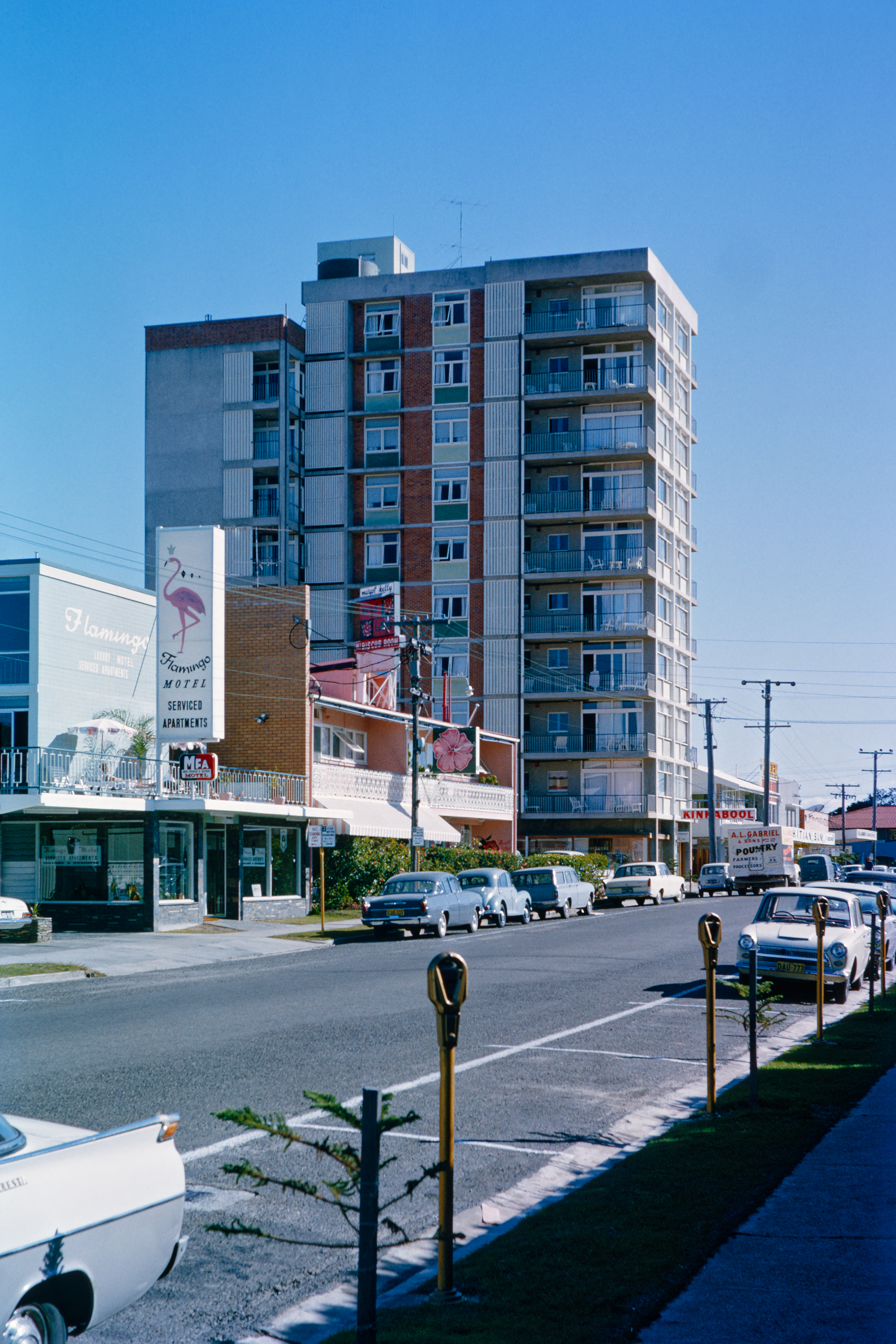
Kinkabool Apartments in July 1965

Kinkabool is a heritage-listed apartment block at 32–34 Hanlan Street, Surfers Paradise, Queensland, Australia. It was designed by John M. Morton of Lund Hutton Newell Black & Paulsen and built from 1959 to 1960 by J D Booker Constructions (Gold Coast) Pty Ltd. It was added to the Queensland Heritage Register on 5 February 2009.

== History ==
=== Background ===
Prior to the 1950s Surfers Paradise was just one of a number of popular but modestly equipped beach holiday resorts that dotted the coast from Southport to the State border with New South Wales. During that decade it became the epicentre of the Gold Coast and what would become an international holiday destination, recognisable for its high-rise towers lining a long strip of sandy beach. This image of Gold Coast high-rise development began with the construction of Kinkabool in 1959–1960.

The coastal areas south of Brisbane – or what became known as the South Coast – had long been a destination for beach holidaymakers. From the 1860s holiday houses for the Brisbane elite and Darling Downs pastoralists were being constructed at Southport on the northern shore of the mouth of the Nerang River. Daily steamboat connections to Brisbane brought day-trippers. The construction of a rail link between Beenleigh and Southport in 1889 opened the area to nascent mass tourism.

The corridor of land now known as Surfers Paradise, between the Nerang River and the ocean beach, was attracting recreational visitors by the 1870s. The land on which Kinkabool stands was part of a selection taken up by James Beattie in 1869 and sold in 1877 to Johann Meyer, who established a vehicular ferry across the Nerang River in 1881, connecting the area with Southport. In clearing the road – later to become Cavill Avenue – that formed the northern boundary of his property he opened up public access to the ocean beach. At opposite ends of this road, Meyer established the first two hotels serving the area: Meyer's Ferry Hotel and the Main Beach Hotel. In 1885 he sold part of his land, which included the site Kinkabool now occupies, to James Stodart, who developed it as the area's first subdivision, Main Beach Estate, with streets named after world champion Australian scullers: Hanlan, Trickett, Laycock and Clifford. The Elston postal receiving office was established in Meyer's Ferry Hotel before the turn of the century, and gave its name to the area.

During the 1920s and 1930s a rapid rise in private motor vehicle ownership, the construction of a new coastal road between Brisbane and Southport, and the crossing of the Nerang River by the Jubilee Bridge led to the subdivision and sale of many estates between Southport and the New South Wales border. The intensity and complexion of this development was further evidenced by the first of Jim Cavill's famous hotels being built on the main road south through Elston in 1925, which was renamed Surfers Paradise in 1933 after successful lobbying by Jim Cavill and other local residents. This reflected the influence of American beach culture and a shift in preference from still-water bathing sites (as at Southport) to surf beaches. Further marketing in southern states of the "winter holiday" attractions of the South Coast was conducted in the years leading up to the commencement of World War II in 1939.

During World War II the South Coast proved a popular rest and recreation destination for combat troops, with many American, New Zealand and English servicemen and women enjoying the place and advertising its merits once home. Many of these international and interstate visitors were impressed by the beaches and climate and returned after the war to visit, reside or invest.

After building restrictions imposed during World War II were lifted in 1952, the South Coast changed rapidly. An intense period of building development and property speculation was ushered in, attracting a number of entrepreneurs focussed largely on the tourism potential of the place. The term "Gold Coast" was coined in response to this promise of prosperity and wealth, and despite beginning as a derisive term used by the Brisbane press, was embraced by locals and then officially adopted as the name of the Town Council in 1958. In the following year the municipality was declared a city. It is the spirit of this era that Kinkabool embodies. The dramatic changes to the built fabric of Surfers Paradise and the Gold Coast in general were succinctly described by Forbes and Spearritt in 2006: "Fibro holiday shacks, two-storey guesthouses and weatherboard boarding lodges were torn down and swept aside, first for three, four and five storey walk ups and later 10, 20, 30 and now 80 storey structures."

In the 1950s a greater capacity to pursue leisure (particularly among women, for whom a beach holiday had previously involved a continuation of everyday domestic tasks), the rise in private car ownership, and the growing preference among holidaymakers for American-style resorts, resulted in changed accommodation styles on the Gold Coast. Chief among these were motels (providing car parking outside each room), hotel resorts, and serviced apartments for visitors who had arrived not by car but by plane or coach. The hotel resorts, which were larger-scale tourist developments accommodating many more guests than the average public house, hotel or guest house, the forms relied upon in the past, included: the five-storey Lennon's Hotel in Broadbeach, designed by Dr Karl Langer in 1956, which included bars and beer garden, pool, tennis courts, dance floor and bandstand; and the three-storey Chevron Hotel in Surfers Paradise designed by David Bell and built for one of Stanley Korman's companies in 1958. The Carapark Motel at Mermaid Beach, designed by the Brisbane architectural firm Hayes and Scott in the mid-1950s was an example of a motel (with facilities for caravans). Others included the El Dorado and the Seabreeze. Serviced apartments were advertised as "luxurious", providing modern conveniences such as refrigerators, clothes washers and dryers, and stainless steel sinks. The kitchens of these apartments were comparatively small, suggesting that a holiday would also involve frequent dining out. Early examples included the South Pacific in Orchid Avenue and the Palm Grove in Clifford Street. All these places were low-rise buildings; all have been demolished.

=== The project ===
Kinkabool is a ten-storey home-unit building located on Hanlan Street in the centre of Surfers Paradise, constructed by JD Booker Constructions Pty Ltd to the design of architect John M Morton working for the Brisbane office of the firm Lund Hutton Newell Black & Paulson Pty Ltd. Kinkabool was the brainchild of Stanley Korman, a Victorian entrepreneur whose other Gold Coast development projects, including Lennon's Hotel at Broadbeach (opened 1956, demolished 1987), the Chevron Hotel at Surfers Paradise (opened 1958, demolished 1987) and Paradise Island (opened 1958), embodied a vision of the place as a modern, international-standard holiday resort. The Gold Coast remains Queensland's premier beach tourism destination.

The iconic Gold Coast skyline of high-rises overlooking long sandy beaches commenced with the construction of ten-storey Kinkabool on Hanlan Street in the heart of Surfers Paradise in 1959–1960; described at the time by the local press as a "giant". A number of high-rise, home-unit developments had been planned for the Gold Coast in the 1950s, but Kinkabool was the only scheme to come to fruition. For example: two 25-storey home-unit "skyscrapers", one at Surfers Paradise on Orchid Avenue and another at Burleigh Heads, were planned by Torbreck Pty Ltd following the success of its Torbreck high-rise blocks in Highgate Hill, Brisbane; a 20-storey accommodation tower was to be added to the Chevron Hotel, its foundations being laid with 350 guests in attendance; and a 17-storey tower called Taj was to be built on Beach Road in Surfers, foundation drilling having commenced in 1959.

The development and finance for Kinkabool were formally arranged by Booker Felton Pty Ltd however a number of companies contributed to its marketing and construction finance. One of the key figures in this matrix was Victorian entrepreneur, Stanley Korman, whose other major ventures on the Gold Coast were the nearby Chevron Hotel and Paradise Island, as well as Lennon's Hotel at Broadbeach and the remodelling of the Surfers Paradise Hotel - the area's leisure and civic hub - which he had purchased from Jim Cavill's widow in 1957. Polish-born Korman had emigrated to Australia in the late 1920s and established the Holeproof clothing company. His business ventures and the charisma he applied to them had established his popular profile as a successful entrepreneur in Victoria. He had a powerful vision of the Gold Coast, and in particular Surfers Paradise, as a modern holiday resort; his inspirations being resorts he visited in Hawaii and Florida. As historian Michael Jones reported in 1986, Korman made the startling suggestion at the time that "southern" businessmen should be able to fly to their Gold Coast holiday unit or home on Friday evening after work, enjoy the beach and warm climate over the weekend, and then fly back to work on Monday morning. And as Alexander McRobbie suggested in The Real Surfers Paradise (1988), Korman also foresaw that many average Australians would come to thrill at the prospect of spending their holidays in a high-rise apartment with a view of the beach, in contrast to their everyday lives and the low-set suburbs that formed its backdrop.

== Approval, construction and design ==
The Gold Coast Town Council approved the nine storey home-unit building being designed to the Hanlan Street boundary and partially to the other boundaries. Morton explains that this was possible because the building regulations, introduced in 1954, were not conceived with this kind of high-rise building in mind. Kinkabool's financiers were eager to take advantage of the 1950s Gold Coast building boom before tighter building controls were introduced.

Construction began some time after July 1959 when the building agreement between Kinkabool Pty Ltd and Multi Units Pty Ltd (the latter appears to have encompassed JD Booker Constructions Pty Ltd), was signed. The cost of construction, including architect's and engineer's fees, was estimated at this point at £272,000. The first stage, comprising two rear car parking areas, two commercial tenancies to the ground floor and eight storeys of four units each was completed soon after May 1960. After this, but before October, twin two-bedroom units had been added over part of the ninth floor and facing the street, mirroring the layout below and designated as penthouses. Such a feature had formed part of the building's design from its inception; however, more lavish ideas for double-storey units with observation decks had been abandoned.

Kinkabool was laid out on a symmetrical plan, the centreline of which ran north to south from the street to the rear of the lot. Entrance was gained through large, central doors on the street into an arcade, which divided the two shops and provided access to a vestibule connecting the stairwell on the eastern side and the lift core on the west. Beyond this, to the rear of the building, and partly underground, were the car parking levels, accessed via external ramps on either side. Above the ground floor and service levels, the units were laid out identically on each of the proceeding eight levels: the stairwell and lift, joined by a small lobby provided access to two 1-bedroom units at the rear and two 2-bedroom units on the street. The 1-bedroom units featured an open-plan living, dining and kitchen area opening onto a small, squarish balcony, facing either east or west. Access to the bedroom with built-in cupboards was from the living area. Its combined bathroom and toilet fitted in behind the kitchen, which also included the laundry facilities. The rooms of the 2-bedroom units opened off a central hall with the front door at one end and the living/dining/kitchen space, combined as in the 1-bedroom units, at the other. A thin, rectangular balcony opened off the open-plan living space on the north-east or north-west corners. A bathroom was inserted between the kitchen and the master bedroom and incorporated laundry facilities. On the tenth level there were two 2-bedroom units at the front next to the lift tower, and a roof garden and drying court to the rear.

The techniques used to erect Kinkabool were not new to Queensland, although they were new to the Gold Coast. The structural frame of the building was made up of reinforced concrete raft foundations, columns and slabs, with similarly made reinforced concrete party walls separating individual dwelling units. The roof areas were flat and sealed with bituminous felt. Exterior in-fill walls were made with a carefully orchestrated pattern of rendered concrete and columns of red face-brick panels. A range of timber-framed window types were used throughout the building, including sliding doors to the balconies. The facade to Hanlan Street was formed using a formal patterning of timber mullions, sashless glass sliders and glass panels painted black before a sill-height wall was installed behind. The balcony balustrading consisted of painted steel verticals with a steel top-rail. A full-height section comprising painted Oregon timber blades set on an angle shielded part of the balcony. A septic tank with associated pump and filter services was installed beneath the building. Water tanks on the roof provided the necessary water pressure for the building's plumbing system.

The detailing employed on the interior of Kinkabool was advertised as "luxurious" in 1960 and demonstrated the ideals of modernity that were to attract holidaymakers to this style of self-contained accommodation. The walls to the shops on the internal arcade were made with glass and Maple framing, and its floors were finished with terrazzo. The stairs were formed in reinforced concrete and lined with pre-cast terrazzo to the first level. The balusters and handrail were milled steel and Maple respectively. Ceilings throughout were sprayed with vermiculite plaster. Inside each unit, and demonstrating very clearly the preferences of the time for modern convenience, the kitchens featured laminated stainless steel sinks, plastic bench-tops, tiled splashbacks and floors, built-in cupboards with plywood doors, and sliding glass facing upper cupboards. They opened into the living area with bar units. The bathrooms were tiled in bright patterns.

== Use ==
The concept of strata title was not introduced into Australia until 1961 (and not into Queensland until 1965) so Kinkabool was developed and sold under company title wherein potential buyers became shareholders and leased their units and garage spaces from the company, depending on the number and class of shares they purchased. Kinkabool Pty Ltd was incorporated on 15 May 1959. Purchasers were required to submit personal references for approval by the company's Board of Directors, and its inaugural Board included Messrs Walter Oswald Burt, John Desmond Booker, Frank Maurice Felton, Roderick Consett Proctor, Ian Kenneth Redpath and Charles Hartley Wilson, who were largely the only shareholders prior to 1964. The "credit squeeze" imposed by the federal government in November 1960, which contributed to the collapse of the Korman empire, initially may have deterred investor demand for the units. Morton and others suggest that, as with Glenfalloch, buyers were cautious about this new style of living in the sky. The mode of ownership of Kinkabool would not be converted to strata title until 1999.

In late 1960 an adjoining land parcel of 14.8 perches (370 m^{2}) to the east was acquired and an easement was created, granting a right to light and air that would protect the views to the beach from Kinkabool's units. This block was subsumed into the Kinkabool holding in 1964, but a single-storeyed twelve-car garage was not built there until 1976, the parking spaces being offered for sale to Kinkabool owners.

Kinkabool was first marketed by LJ Hooker Ltd who produced a coloured brochure emphasising its appeal as a modern accommodation option for owner/occupiers as well as a valuable investment acquisition. By July 1961, Dolby and Rankine (Accommodation) Pty Ltd had been appointed sole managing agents for Kinkabool and reported to The South Coast Bulletin that some units had been let for the Christmas period, while others were being readied for such use. It was also reported that some units had been let for periods of three to five months to New Zealand residents; and the penthouse had been let for Christmas at 40 guineas a week. Laurie Wall, a well-known Gold Coast real estate agent and identity would eventually sell the majority of unit shares in 1964.

It took four years for the 34 units and two penthouses, priced between $6000 and $8000, to be sold.

From the beginning, Kinkabool was used as holiday accommodation, both by unit owners and short-term tenants, who visited during the annual holiday seasons of Easter and Christmas. A resident building manager or caretaker was employed from the mid-1960s; their duties included assisting owners and tenants with such services as providing televisions, linen and cutlery, moving luggage, and cleaning units after short-term holiday tenants had departed.

The LJ Hooker marketing brochure boasted that Kinkabool was "changing the skyline". As the tallest building on the coast it towered above the rapidly expanding set of hotels and motels at its feet, being a Gold Coast landmark and prominent in photographs and postcards from the 1960s. In the decade after its construction other coastal high-rises followed, such as: The Sands in 1964–1966 (11 storeys) and Paradise Towers (14 storeys) next door in 1965–1966, both designed by Sydney architect EG Nemes for the developer Alexander Armstrong; Garfield Towers, designed by FB Oswell, in 1966–1967; and Suntower on the Esplanade in 1968. The two River Park Towers were built on Watson Esplanade facing the Nerang River in 1969.

== Architecture ==
The "skyscraper" Kinkabool was designed for a small 16 perches (400 m^{2}) site occupied by the Flamingo, a pioneer nightclub started in the early 1950s; near the key entertainment venues of Surfers Paradise. Next door was Margot Kelly's Hibiscus Restaurant, another popular and pioneering Surfers Paradise nightclub and one of the first Queensland restaurants to gain a liquor license. At the end of Hanlan Street was Surfers Paradise Beach. Between Kinkabool and the beach were the Coral Court holiday units, described as a leading holiday establishment and a more typical style of Gold Coast accommodation in the 1950s and 1960s. Other significant Surfers Paradise tourist businesses were only a block in each direction. To the north were Cavill Avenue and the Surfers Paradise Hotel complex, Bernie Elsie's Beachcomber Hotel (along with the Seabreeze Motel, home of the infamous Pyjama Parties), and many popular restaurants. Beyond these were The Walk and the Black Dolphin shopping arcades. Nearby was Korman's Chevron Hotel with 83 rooms, pools, bars and cabaret.

The first sketch drawings for Kinkabool, originally known as Poinciana Place, were prepared by John M Morton of the Brisbane architectural firm Lund Hutton Newell Black and Paulson Pty Ltd, in March 1959. The client was variously listed as Home Units Pty Ltd and Multi Units Pty Ltd. Its original concept designs featured between three and six storeys above a ground floor of shops, but within a month the height had increased to nine storeys, and by construction time the name had changed to Kinkabool, reputedly derived from an Aboriginal word meaning "laughing water".

Architecturally, Kinkabool is a characteristic example of 1950s architecture in Queensland, being a competent essay in mid-twentieth century modernism with straight lines dominating the facade, flat roofs and an absence of ornament. Influences on the design included English modernism as derived from that country's extensive post-war reconstruction efforts and the work of internationally renowned modern architects like Mies van der Rohe. The chief architect, John M Morton, was born and trained in England, having been in Australia only two years before starting work on Kinkabool. Lund Hutton Newell Black & Paulsen Pty Ltd was an established Queensland architectural firm with offices in Brisbane and Townsville, and busy completing a range of larger-scale commercial, ecclesiastical and multi-residential projects throughout the State. Morton was to become a partner and the firm, which had started as Ford & Chambers, would eventually come under his sole charge. He was later responsible for the Central Library Building at the Queensland Institute of Technology and the master plan for the Queensland Government precinct near Parliament House and the City Botanic Gardens in Brisbane. Soon after completing Kinkabool the same design, building and finance team completed Glenfalloch, another high-rise residential tower, this time in Brisbane's New Farm.

== Modern building ==
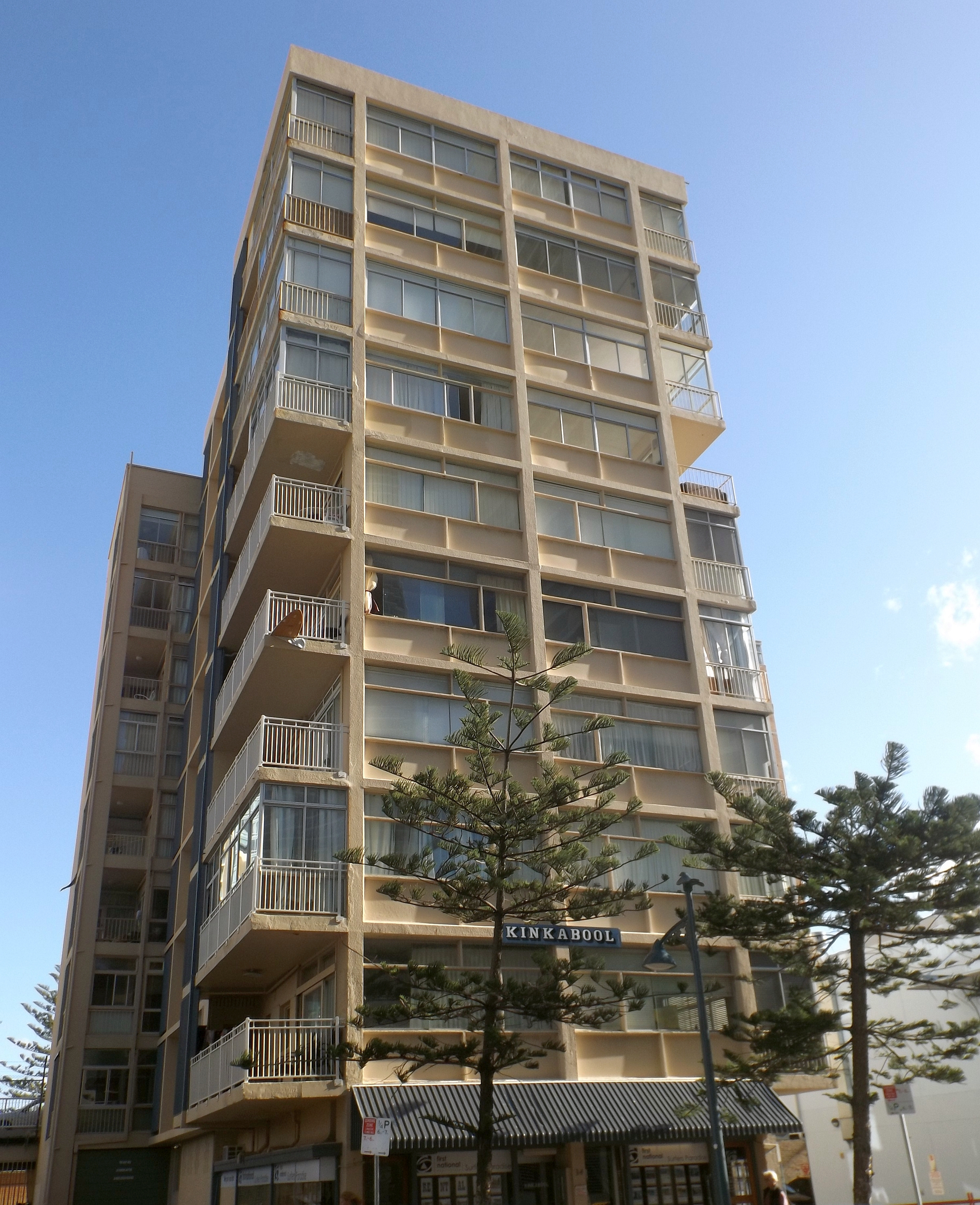
Front of building, 2015

Kinkabool is a high-rise unit building located in the heart of Surfers Paradise a block to the south of Cavill Avenue and about 200m from the ocean beach to the east. It presents ten storeys to the street and nine to the rear. On the ground floor, the two shop spaces retain the timber-framed and glass partitioning. On the eight storeys above the original layout of the 34 units has been maintained. The two "penthouse" units on the tenth storey have been joined by a large opening in the shared wall between the original living areas and by enclosing part of the original vestibule space as a private lobby.

Founded on reinforced concrete footings, the frame of Kinkabool is constructed of reinforced concrete floors, columns and walls. The exterior is partly finished with alternating panels of painted render on concrete or face brick. The building has two areas of flat roof, access to which is gained first through double doors opposite the entry to the top level apartment, and then via a set of stairs to the upper roof space. A parapet encloses these roof areas.

More than half of the balconies have been enclosed with glass and aluminium framing, a process which began in the late 1960s, but has been kept within the line of the balustrading and completed in general keeping with the fenestration pattern employed elsewhere on the facade. Also, a number of the original timber-framed windows and exterior sliding doors have been replaced with aluminium alternatives, as has some of the balcony balustrading. The terrazzo flooring in the ground floor arcade has been covered with terracotta tiles; however it remains on the stairs to the first level. Vinyl lines the remainder of the stair floors and the floors of the vestibules, being differently patterned on each level.

== Heritage listing ==
Kinkabool was listed by the National Trust in 1994 as it was "rare surviving evidence of the 1950s period of expansion on the Coast". It was listed on the Queensland Heritage Register on 5 February 2009 having satisfied the following criteria.

The place is important in demonstrating the evolution or pattern of Queensland's history.

Built in 1959–1960 at Surfers Paradise, the home-unit building known as Kinkabool was the Gold Coast's first high-rise and one of Queensland's earliest, built shortly after Torbreck was completed in Brisbane in 1960. It is important in demonstrating the pattern of Queensland's beach tourism development as it is the starting point for a style and scale of multiple-dwelling and multi-title building that appeared in the late 1950s/1960s and from which the Gold Coast, Queensland's premier tourist destination in terms of visitor numbers, gained its international reputation.

Kinkabool also illustrates a significant aspect of the evolving character of the quintessential Australian beach holiday, which was highly influenced by American standards of accommodation and entertainment, particularly during the 1950s and 1960s. It reflects a shift in the preferences of many post-World War II Australian tourists away from traditional holiday accommodation options like camping or caravanning, guest or boarding houses toward high-rise, self-contained apartments with a view of the beach and equipped with modern conveniences like time-saving kitchen appliances and on-site pools. This shift reflects major changes that have occurred in Australian society, including increased prosperity, the changing role of women, and the embrace of the private car.

Situated one block to the south of Cavill Avenue, near the intersection with the Gold Coast Highway, Kinkabool is one of the few buildings remaining that delineates what was the heart of burgeoning Surfers Paradise in the 1950s, with its modern accommodation, entertainment and shopping venues.

The place is important in demonstrating the principal characteristics of a particular class of cultural places.

Kinkabool demonstrates the principal characteristics of a class of cultural place – high-rise beach holiday accommodation – that was rare in Queensland in the 1950s but is now common, particularly at the Gold Coast. A number of components of Kinkabool have been maintained to the present day and reflect the standards marketed in the 1950s and 1960s as "luxurious", but which also exemplify the character of this type of building. These include: the overall disposition of units; their relationship to private balconies, some of which have been enclosed with framed glass, all of which retain the original timber blade screens; the two ground floor shop spaces either side of an arcade leading to the lift and stair lobby and enclosed with the original timber framing and fixed glass; and the scale and location of the penthouse apartments. Despite the scale of the building being diminished by later high-rise accommodation developments all along the coast from Southport to Coolangatta, the Kinkabool units maintain their views to the beach and the hinterland, which were also important components of the building's attraction to early buyers and holidaymakers.

Rather than detracting from its significance, the great disparity in scale and appointment between Kinkabool and buildings like the 80-storey Q1 tower, demonstrates dramatically how tourist preferences, architectural design and construction technologies have evolved on the Gold Coast since the 1950s.

In 2024 the Queensland Department of Environment placed an enforcement order on a real estate agent operating in a ground floor office of Kinkabool for replacing timber windows with aluminium, thereby breaching heritage laws.

== Legacy ==
Development of ever taller high-rise unit towers continued during the 1970s, booming between 1979 and 1982, and giving the Gold Coast a key component of its national and international identity. Approval had been granted for the construction of more than 5,000 units in the six months before the crash that brought this period of fevered property speculation to an end in mid-1982. Favourable development conditions returned during a number of later building phases, and high-rise developments continued. As Richard Allom, lead author of the 1997 Character Study of the Gold Coast, said in a Weekend Bulletin article from that year: "Dating from the 1960s, the Gold Coast had a form generated by a stretch of beach and a culture dependent on climate and tourism. ... It was a fantasy city like Las Vegas and its "wonderful Great Divide of high-rise buildings" was its most important icon."

Suburban and semi-industrial development has rapidly overtaken much of the Gold Coast and its immediate hinterland, as its permanent population has expanded and its economic base diversified. But its tourism industry has also grown, making it internationally recognisable. Many of Kinkabool's lower-rise contemporaries of the 1950s and 1960s have been lost to this latter kind of expansion.

In 2009, a two-bedroom apartment on the seventh floor had an asking price of A$279,000 (US$183,107.70). At the height of its popularity, the penthouse cost A$84/week, in comparison to the average weekly wage of A$57/week. In 2021 a car park attached to Kinkbool sold for $110,000, and a 250 m^{2} (2,700 sq ft) penthouse apartment with period furniture and memorabilia sold for $650,000.

Kinkabool was the tallest building on the Gold Coast for four years, overtaken in 1963 by 11-storey The Sands. In contrast to Kinkabool's 34 units and 10 storeys, as of 2026, the current tallest building in the area is Q1 at 80 levels with 526 apartments.

With its rectangular shape, flat roof without ornamental extras, the building has been described as unremarkable, aesthetically unpleasing and "almost an eyesore".
