= Wilson Architects =

Practice information
- Founders: Alexander Brown Wilson
- Founded: 1884; 141 years ago
- Location: Brisbane, Queensland (head office)

Website
- wilsonarchitects.com.au

Wilson Architects is one of Australia's the oldest architectural practices in Australia. The firm specialises in the design of educational and laboratory spaces and facilities.

== History ==
Wilson Architects was founded in 1884 by Alexander Brown Wilson. After Wilson's retirement in 1928 the firm has been managed by Wilson's son, grandson, and its current managing director is Hamilton B. Wilson, Wilson's great grandson. Wilson Architects has received a number of awards from the Australian Institute of Architects, the Australian Institute of Landscape Architects, received Australian Interior Design Awards, among others.
