= Torbreck, Brisbane =

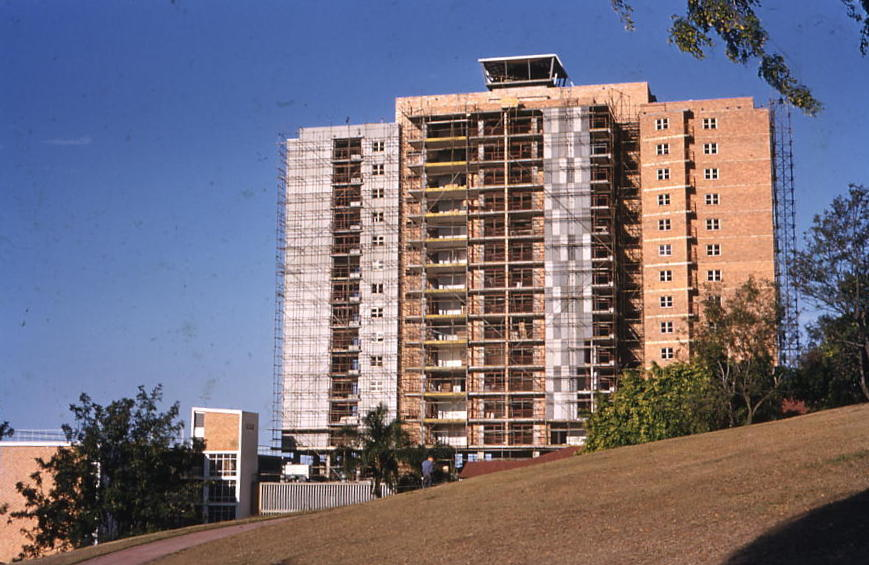

- Location within Queensland Location within Australia
- 27.4864°S 153.0179°E
- Location: 182 Dornoch Terrace, Highgate Hill, City of Brisbane, Queensland, Australia

History
- Design period: 1940s–1960s (post-World War II)
- Built: 1958–1960

Site notes
- Architect(s): Aubrey Horswill Job and Robert Percival Froud
- Architectural style: International Style

Queensland Heritage Register
- Official name: Torbreck
- Type: state heritage (landscape, built)
- Designated: 17 December 1999
- Reference no.: 601256
- Significant period: 1950s (fabric, historical); 1950s (social)
- Significant components: tower: observation/lookout, swimming pool, garden/grounds, furniture/fittings, views to, garage, residential accommodation: home unit/s, roof deck/terrace/promenade, views from, lawn/s, direction dial
- Builders: Noel Austin Kratzmann

Torbreck, or the Torbreck Home Units, was the first high-rise and mix-use residential development in Queensland, Australia. These heritage-listed home units are located at 182 Dornoch Terrace, Highgate Hill, Brisbane. Designed by architects Aubrey Horswill Job and Robert Percival Froud (Job and Froud Architects), construction began in 1957 and was completed three years later in 1960 by Noel Austin Kratzmann. The project acquired the name 'Torbreck' to recognise a small, gabled timber cottage that previously occupied the site (called Torbreck). It was added to the Queensland Heritage Register on 17 December 1999.

== History ==
Torbreck was erected in 1958–1960 to the design of Brisbane architects Aubrey Horswill Job and Robert Percival Froud and comprised two stages; a low rise Garden Block to Chermside Street and a high rise Tower Block to Dornoch Terrace. Importantly, it was the first multi-storeyed home unit development in Queensland, constructed when Brisbane's Building Ordinances had no provision for home units, and advertised at the time as the greatest single contribution to home development in the state. When first promoted in 1957, the scheme received support from Queensland Premier Frank Nicklin, who saw this high-density, inner urban residential development as an important contribution toward curbing Brisbane's urban sprawl.

Though initially Torbreck was only designed so far as a single perspective sketch, the project drew headlines, due to intense publicity efforts of developer Rowley Pimley. As the first high-rise residential project in Queensland, Torbreck received a considerable amount of public interest and media coverage throughout its inception and construction. It made several headlines from October 1957, to 1960, when construction was completed and residents began moving in. Public response and interest in the project was greater than anything earlier in Brisbane's history.

The design project and planning began in 1957 at the request of Rowley Pym. The capital used to fund construction was drawn from pre-sales of units, prompting an unprecedented level of media attention to the tower. The project was considerably rushed, encountering many financial difficulties and administrative errors.

Torbreck Pty Ltd, which became Torbreck Home Units Ltd from mid-1960, was formed in 1957, and was headed by accountant Wilfred Charles Betts, builder Noel Austin Kratzmann, and solicitor Sholto Douglas. The aim of this company was to promote and construct a new type of Queensland residential accommodation; the multi-storeyed home unit complex. Torbreck Kratzman Pty Ltd., the company formed to build the apartments declared bankruptcy prior to the construction of the tower block, and the project was sold to Reid Murray Developments in 1959, which consequently went into liquidation before the project was completed. The original sponsor of the scheme was Rowley Pym, a former Western Queensland fencing contractor, whose grandmother is understood to have owned the first Torbreck, a c. 1876 house whose name meant top of the hill. Title to this Dornoch Terrace site was transferred to the company in mid-1958. The blocks facing Chermside Street were acquired in 1961–62.

The home unit complex was designed by Queensland architects AH Job & RP Froud. Their work was influenced by post-Second World War International Style, particularly the North American model, which had a strong impact on architecture in Queensland in the 1950s. WG Alexander & HV Browne were the structural engineers.

Torbreck was erected by NA Kratzmann Pty Ltd, one of the largest building contractors in Queensland by the late 1950s. The eight-storeyed garden block was constructed using the lift-slab technique, whereby the roof and floors were prefabricated on the ground, then hoisted into position by jacks mounted on the vertical wall supports. This construction technique had not been used in Queensland before. The fourteen-storeyed tower block was erected along more conventional lines.

Rowley Pym formed Torbreck Real Estate Brokers to market the new development, and most of the units were sold before the complex was completed. Purchasers paid a one-third deposit, then the balance was paid in four instalments during the construction period. Owners became investors in the company, receiving £1 shares in Torbreck Home Units Limited to the value of the purchase price. Directors of the company were, and still are, elected from among the unit owners. Despite strata title having been available in Queensland since 1965, Torbreck remains under company title.

Torbreck introduced to Queensland a new concept in residential accommodation. The promotional literature offered Queenslanders a share of the American dream that had reached Australia via the Hollywood cinema: spectacular views, an acre of landscaped gardens, and luxurious, convenient, secure, private accommodation, with an estimated running cost to each owner of 10/- per week. Each floor was serviced by the latest in automatic lifts, and each unit owner was to be provided with a private garage and mail box. Each of the 150 home units was designed with at least one private balcony, and was fitted with built-ins, electric kitchen, two telephone connections (bedroom and lounge), sewerage and garbage disposal facilities, washing machine and clothes drier. Water, pumped from the city reservoirs to large storage tanks on the roof, was treated by the latest in American water-softening equipment. Television reception was available, and a swimming pool was constructed in the grounds.

Due to spiralling construction costs and/or lack of Brisbane City Council approval, some of the more elaborate aspects of the scheme had to be abandoned: shopping facilities and professional suites at ground level; basement laundry service; a top-class restaurant offering room service; a terrace cafe; roof and indoor gardens; and a tennis court, putting green and fully equipped children's playground. A planned rooftop observation lounge translated as an enclosed rooftop viewing deck.

However, the project captured public imagination even before construction commenced. By May 1958, "Torbreck" had become the most popular lottery syndicate name in Brisbane. By mid-1959, the developers were sufficiently confident in the success of Torbreck to announce preliminary plans and schematic designs for Torbreck-Surfers Paradise and Torbreck-Burleigh. Neither of these developments eventuated, but Torbreck opened the Queensland market for home units. Other projects to follow included Camden along Kingsford Smith Drive, Glenfalloch in New Farm, and Kinkabool at Surfers Paradise. In order to market the property, the developers Reid Murray Developments Pty Ltd published a small brochure detailing the attributes of Torbreck and providing floor plans to the seven types of flats available in the tower block. This document recognises the "commanding and panoramic views of Brisbane, coupled with the full benefit of cooling breezes" offered by the units.

In 1962/1963 the Royal Australian Institute of Architects (Queensland Chapter) awarded AH Job and RP Froud with a commendation for the Garden Block at Torbreck. The partnership were awarded other RAIA awards including for Residences of a High Standard for the McDough Residence, Fig Tree Pocket also in 1962/3; and a commendation for the Lane Residence, St Lucia in 1965. Job and Froud were also awarded the Robin Gibson Award for Enduring Architecture in the 2014 Queensland Architecture Awards for their work on Torbreck.

The building is featured in a music video for the song "If You Want Release" by the group Far Out Corporation.

== Description ==
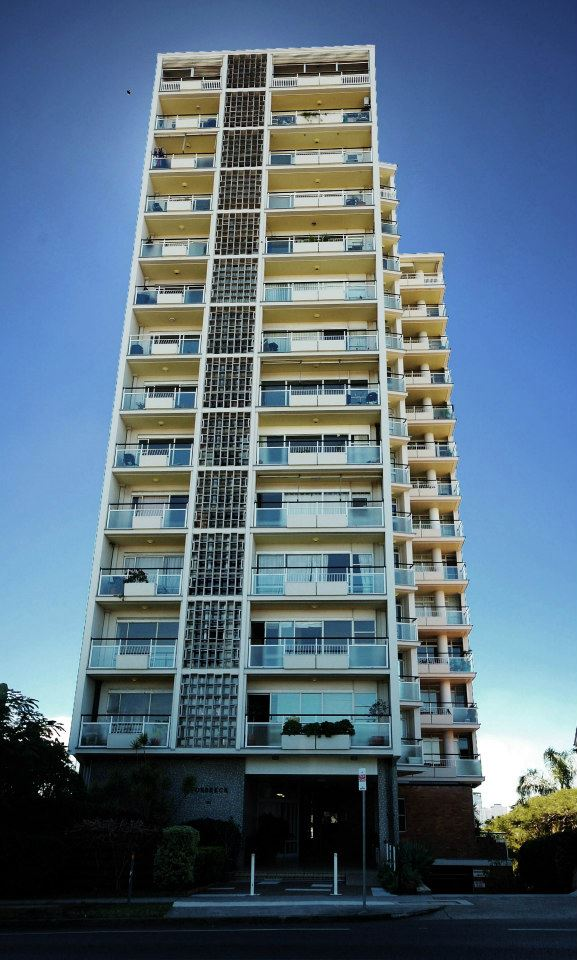
Torbreck tower, 2012

Prominently located on the crest of Highgate Hill, Torbreck is a landmark, visible from many places in Brisbane. It is a soft-modernist high-rise building, located between Dornoch Terrace and Chermside Street, on approximately 6,521 square metres (70,190 sq ft) of land. The building itself covers approximately 1,749.15 square metres (18,827.7 sq ft) of land, with 150 individual units, totalling 19,892.78 square metres (214,124.1 sq ft) in floor area. It comprises two modernist-influenced reinforced concrete and brick buildings on a one and a half acre site which slopes steeply to the north: an eighteen-storey, south-facing Tower Block, and a long, narrow, eight storey north-facing Garden Block. The former features panoramic views of Brisbane city, while the latter overlooks a landscaped garden and communal swimming pool. The tower block sits on four levels of garages and storage areas, and is crowned by a glazed observation room. The Tower Block links at foyer level to the top floor of the Garden Block. The Garden Block is eight-storeyed; it fronts onto lawns and a pool, and is also accessed from Chermside St. The stepping of the buildings on the site optimises the northerly aspect and views.

The external form of the Tower Block comprises vertically articulated concrete bays projecting out to the cardinal points from a brick core. It has full length verandahs to the north and south, and balconies facing east and west, including "Romeo and Juliet" balconies, angled out to catch glimpses of the southern views. The eastern and western bays have full height wide blue steel louvres flanked by textured concrete panels. The building rests on a concrete-louvred plinth, and steps up to meet the observation tower at its pinnacle. The garden block is a long rectangular building with verandahs to the north and walkway access to the south, which overlooks gardens with lawned areas, trees and a kidney shaped pool. It has brick walls to the east and west. All the brickwork on Torbreck is patterned and textured with projecting bricks.

The Dornoch Terrace entrance comprises a tiled undercroft with substantial square columns, adjacent to a leasable space with a faceted glass wall. This entrance links, via a waiting lounge, lift lobby, corridor and concrete bridge, to a large concrete viewing terrace on the top storey of the Garden Block. The Garden Block is entered via a porte-cochère and glazed foyer in the undercroft.

Torbreck has 150 units, including bedsits, one, two and three bedroom units, and penthouse flats, with brick and reinforced concrete party walls. The Tower Block has a typical plan comprising four units forming a rectangle around a service core, with a single unit wing extending to the north and a double unit wing extending to the south. The typical plan of the Garden Block has seven adjacent units. The units are skilfully planned, optimising both space and views. The units have full-height timber sliding doors leading onto tiled balconies.

The building contains some details which are well-considered in relation to climate and human occupation. The balconies and verandahs have concrete planters with sloped steel balustrades above, flanked by frosted glass panels, providing both privacy and views. Metal sunshades with louvres above the Garden Block balconies and louvres to the Tower Block assist in providing thermal comfort. The walkways to the Garden Block have different coloured chequered tiled floors to each level for orientation. The lift landings in the Tower Block also have different decor for different landing levels. All landing levels in both blocks have steel garbage shute doors and timber milk bottle hatches. The observation tower has sloping glass walls which assist viewing, and contains a central stainless steel and brass direction dial. The observation tower commands exceptional 360-degree views of Brisbane and surrounds.

Torbreck demonstrates design skill in its adaptation of the "international style" to site, climate and human occupation, in its maximising the natural advantages of the site; sun shading and louvres, detailing of balustrades, remaining original lift landing features, and observation room. It also demonstrates a clear 1950s aesthetic sensibility in its articulation of external forms, and its use of materials, in particular the use of texture in the brick and concrete work, and in its use of steel louvres.

Torbreck remains substantially intact as an impressive Brisbane landmark.

The immediate surrounds are well vegetated, with the plants providing shade for the outdoor living areas and car park. Each unit in Torbreck has at least one balcony, which include planter boxes and glass balustrades. Torbreck is constructed from concrete and brick, with expressive detailing in brickwork, stone and timber, to address the domestic scale. The development was originally designed to provide social and public amenity with a mix-used ground floor, having facilities such as shops and restaurants, these were never built.

=== Climatic design ===
Job and Froud saw it important that each apartment carefully considered privacy, outlook and proper orientation. These principles, coupled with the trend towards passive climatic design that was popularised in Queensland by Karl Langer, resulted in a design that strongly incorporated passive design principles. As well as informing Torbreck's planning, technologies such as the innovative aluminium vertical blade sun shading system were incorporated to manage breezes, solar heat and glare impact and maximise the use of natural light within the building. The significance and attention given to external garden spaces further demonstrates the significance of the climate and place of Brisbane as design drivers.

=== Construction techniques ===
Both blocks demonstrate a different approach to concrete construction, the Tower block being a relatively standard example of a reinforced concrete structure of the late 1950s, while the Garden block employed the new ‘lift-slab construction' system, the first of its kind in Queensland. The term lift-slab defines a style of construction in which each floor, and the roof are pre-fabricated on the ground in a stack and raised into position along vertical wall supports. The external walls are cavity brick and provide an aesthetically domestic cladding for the building, as well as providing insulative properties. Internal walls dividing apartments were of a double brick construction to reduce sound transfer, while walls within apartments were of a non-load bearing nature to allow for simple future renovations. Different room configurations were also made possible off the plan. Provisions were made for television points (TV was relatively new) and each apartment had a gas clothes drying cupboard and the building boasted a filtered water supply via rooftop tanks. A garbage chute was available on every floor in both towers and rubbish was originally incinerated via a basement incinerator on level B1 which was ignited at night time so that the smoke out of the tower block rooftop was less visible. The building used to ( and may still have) a postal box in the lobby in order to mail letters and mail is delivered to each floor by Australia Post rather than to central mailboxes in the lobby as with modern buildings. The rooftop observation deck, a common area for all residents, was originally designed to be a cocktail lounge however these plans never materialised. In order to purchase an apartment off the plan, an initial deposit was required and then scheduled progress payments fell due at certain points during the construction until the balance was due upon completion. One monthly fee per apartment covers council rates, water and association/ maintenance and administration fees. Potential buyers could also see their potential view via helicopter at one stage during construction. Apparently there was little security in the early years and Highgate Hill locals used to walk through the lobby off Dornoch Tce and exit on Chermside St via the Garden Block lift as a short cut. The original Tower Block internal lift doors contained a small rectangular window through which you could see the various floors, concrete and brickwork pass by as you travelled between floors.

== Heritage listing ==
Torbreck was listed on the Queensland Heritage Register on 17 December 1999 having satisfied the following criteria.

- The place is important in demonstrating the evolution or pattern of Queensland's history.: Torbreck has historical significance as the first company-titled multi-storeyed home unit development erected in Queensland based on 1950s North American models. The construction of Torbreck pioneered the market for this type of home unit development in Queensland.
- The place is important in demonstrating the principal characteristics of a particular class of cultural places.: Torbreck is of architectural significance as a well designed example of multi storeyed home unit building, particularly in its site planning and detailing. The Torbreck complex is a good example of 1950s architectural and landscape design in its form, attention to climate control and use of materials.
- The place is important because of its aesthetic significance.: Torbreck has aesthetic and social significance as a prominent landmark of inner suburban Brisbane.
- The place is important in demonstrating a high degree of creative or technical achievement at a particular period.: The Garden Block is an early use of lift-slab construction in Queensland and is of technological significance.
- The place has a strong or special association with a particular community or cultural group for social, cultural or spiritual reasons.: Torbreck has aesthetic and social significance as a prominent landmark of inner suburban Brisbane.

== See also ==
- Architecture of Australia
