= Wairuna, Brisbane =

Wairuna
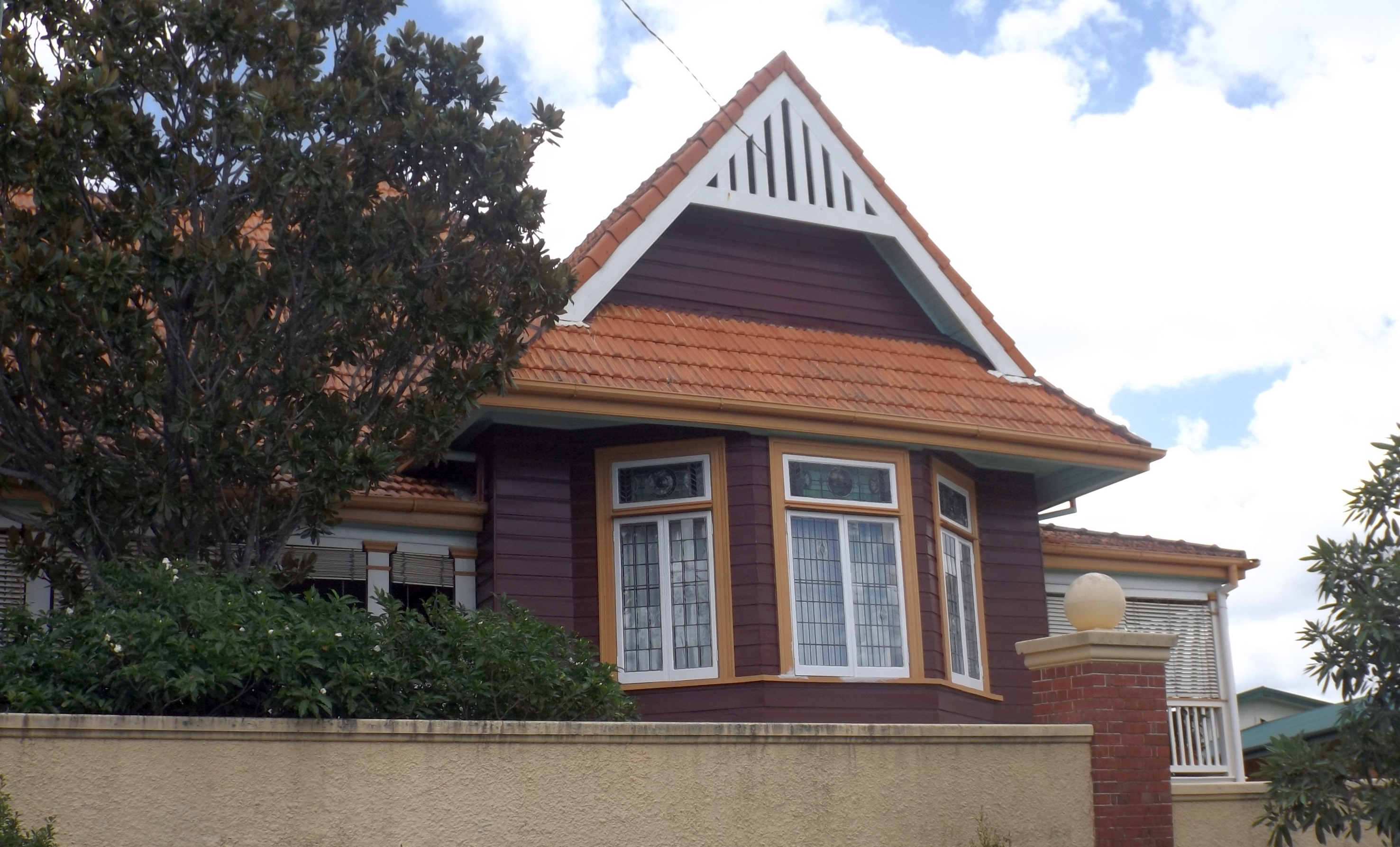
- House in 2015

- Location within Queensland Location within Australia
- 27.4831°S 153.0156°E
- Location: 27 Hampstead Road, Highgate Hill, City of Brisbane, Queensland, Australia

History
- Design period: 1870s–1890s (late 19th century)
- Built: 1896–1900
- Built for: James Allan

Site notes
- Architect: Robin Dods

Queensland Heritage Register
- Official name: Wairuna
- Type: state heritage (landscape, built)
- Designated: 21 October 1992
- Reference no.: 600226
- Significant period: 1890s–1900s (fabric, historical)
- Significant components: residential accommodation – main house, terracing, fence/wall – perimeter

Wairuna is a heritage-listed detached house at 27 Hampstead Road, Highgate Hill, City of Brisbane, Queensland, Australia. It was designed by Robin Dods and built from 1896 to 1900. It was added to the Queensland Heritage Register on 21 October 1992.

== History ==
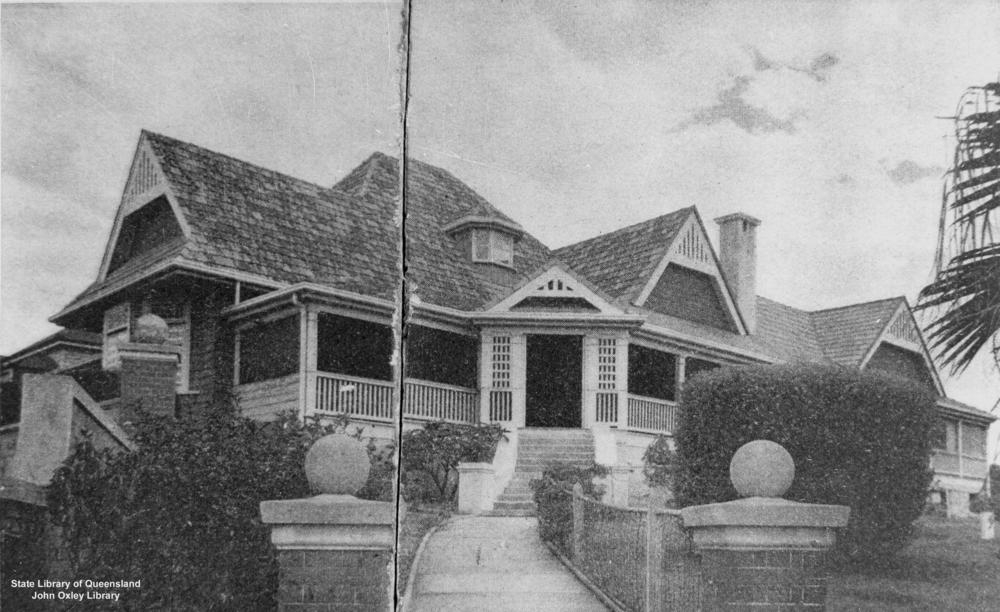
Wairuna, circa 1945

Wairuna was constructed as the residence of James Allan between 1896 and 1900, to the design of fine Brisbane architect Robin Dods.

James Allan was the co-founder of the drapery and outfitting firm, Allan and Stark who had outlets in South Brisbane and Queen Street. Allan and Stark were operating from the mid-1880s and remained in business as a major Queensland department store until they were taken over by Myer in the later half of the twentieth century.

James Allan and his new wife, Elizabeth Stark, moved into a house in Hampstead Road on the site of Wairuna which Allan bought on 4 February 1885. Wairuna was constructed in several stages from 1896 until 1900 and there is suggestion that the original house in which the couple were living was somehow incorporated in the new Dods' designed residence. However, there is very little evidence of this at the house, although material including timber and doors may well have been recycled within the Allan's new house. When constructed Wairuna included a tennis court and tennis pavilion, a fence and surrounding gardens. Robert Smith (Robin) Dods was a prolific, innovative and highly skilled Brisbane architect. Dods was articled in Edinburgh to Hay and Henderson and also attended classes of the local Architectural Association, before moving to London and joining the office of prominent nineteenth century architect, Sir Aston Webb in 1890. He returned to Brisbane after winning a competition for the Brisbane Hospital and began a partnership Hall & Dods with local architect, Francis Richard Hall. Dods was a sophisticated architect, able to well integrate the contemporary innovative design of the Arts and Crafts movement with the climatic features of a sub-tropical climate. Wairuna is certainly an example of this integration of ideas, a finely designed building following the Arts and Crafts tradition with a high pitched complex roof, multi gabled and bayed projections and an overall picturesque quality, achieved whilst obtaining a comfortable and livable Queensland house.

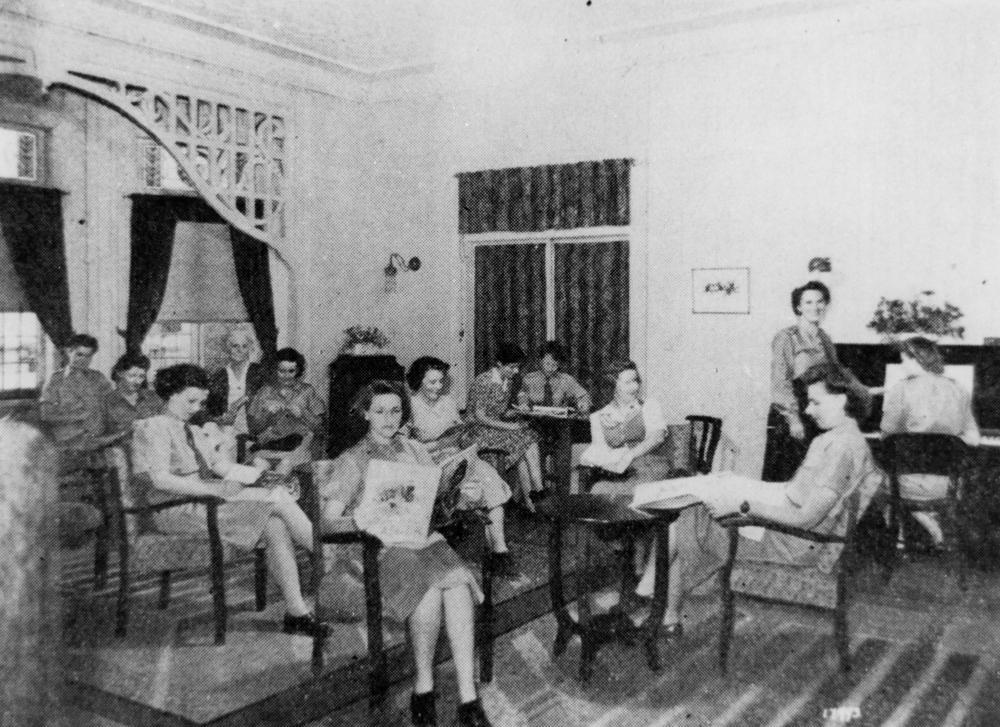
Group of servicewomen in the lounge room at 'Wairuna', 1940s

James Allan died on 27 January 1938 and Wairuna was acquired by the Presbyterian Church on 16 March 1943. The building was used as a hostel from 1939 until 1972, then as a Home Mission Training Institute and in 1977 was used as a Uniting Church manse. During the period of church ownership many internal partitions were added and the bathroom facilities were extended. A church hall was constructed on the site of the former tennis court. Subdivision followed and the church was sold into private ownership in about 1984.

== Description ==
Wairuna is a substantial mostly one storeyed elevated timber building on a prominent site in Hampstead Road, Highgate Hill. The building has a complex steeply pitched hipped and gabled roof clad with red Marseilles patterned terracotta roof tiles. Gabled projections on the roof give external expression to bay windows and other projections which would otherwise be concealed by verandahs. The gabled projections on the roof are clad with a variety of small terracotta tiles or horizontal timber boarding. The projections have decorative bargeboards partially infilled with either vertical timber battening or cross braced timber members.

The building is timber framed and clad with horizontal beaded boarding. Tall rectangular stuccoed chimney stacks with simple cut out decorative motif below the cap. The building is lined on the northern facade, facing toward the central business district, with a wide timber framed verandah. The verandah has rectangular timber posts, a simple vertical battened balustrade. The verandahs are lined with timber louvred screen and latticing. The pitch of the roof becomes more shallow over the verandahs.

Pedestrian entrance to the house is via a set of secured concrete stairs from Hampstead Road which curve up to a lawned terrace in front of the northern facade of the house. From this timber steps lead to a double timber latticed door in a small diagonally placed porch projecting from the verandah. This north eastern end of the verandah expands to form a large open piazza area. From the piazza access is provided to a double timber entrance door, flanked by leadlight sidelights and surmounted by a rectangular transom, also glazed with leadlight. From here, a small entrance vestibule is separated from the entrance hall by a colonnade.

Internally the building has timber boarded floors, vertical timber boarded walls and ceilings clad with decorative pressed metal sheeting. The interior is arranged around a large central space comprising the entrance hall and a large conservatory hall to the west of the hall and linked by a short hallway. Both of these central rooms have large clerestory windows, providing natural light to what would otherwise be quite dark central rooms. Surrounding these rooms and accessed from them are a number of rooms including a drawing room, dining room, study, three bedrooms along with a number of smaller ancillary rooms including a servant's bedroom, bathroom and toilet, kitchen, serving pantry and scullery. Access is provided to two stairs from the conservatory, one internal timber stair and, quite near this, at the western end of the house, an external stair, leading to a rear terrace. Most internal timber doors, which are generally four panelled, are surmounted by operable transom lights. The internal rooms are generally generously sized spaces and the interior is a substantially intact late nineteenth century residence, although many of the service areas have been refitted with modern facilities.

== Heritage listing ==
Wairuna was listed on the Queensland Heritage Register on 21 October 1992 having satisfied the following criteria.

The place is important in demonstrating the evolution or pattern of Queensland's history.

Wairuna is a substantial timber residence, constructed between 1896 and 1900, and demonstrates the growth of South Brisbane during this period when many large residences were erected.

The place is important in demonstrating the principal characteristics of a particular class of cultural places.

The building is a good example of the work of Robin Dods, adapting Arts and Crafts design philosophy with the climatic constraints posed by sub-tropical dwelling.

The place has a special association with the life or work of a particular person, group or organisation of importance in Queensland's history.

The building has special associations with Robin Dods, the architect and with James Allan for whom it was constructed.
