= Gloucester Street railway station =

Former railway station in Brisbane, Queensland, Australia

Gloucester Street
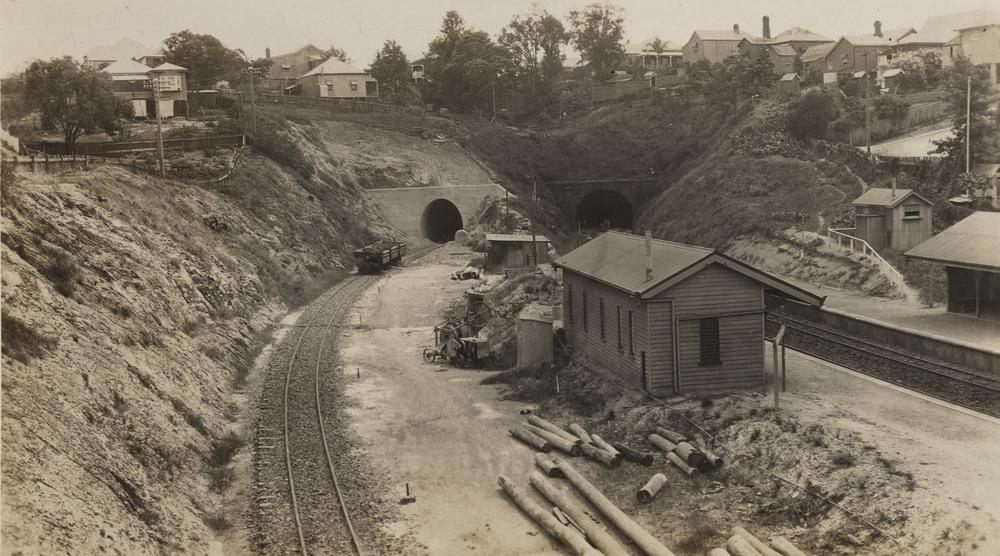
- Gloucester Street Railway station ca 1930 (State Library of Queensland)

General information
- Location: Gloucester Street, Highgate Hill
- Coordinates: 27°29′16″S 153°01′28″E
- Owner: Queensland Rail
- Operator: Queensland Rail
- Line: Cleveland
- Platforms: 2 side
- Tracks: 3

Construction
- Structure type: Ground

History
- Closed: 1978
Location

Gloucester Street railway station was located on the Cleveland line in Queensland, Australia between Vulture Street and Boggo Road stations. The station was opened on 21 December 1891 along with Boggo Road and South Brisbane stations as part of a new line replacing the one through Woolloongabba for passenger traffic. All that is left of the station is the overgrown unused platform and three tunnel entrances leading to South Bank.

Most platforms south of the Brisbane River were progressively lengthened in the late 1970s to accommodate SX sets and the new Electric Multiple Unit trains. The existing platforms used up all the available space between the Stephens Road tunnel and the Gloucester Street bridge. Rather than going to the expense of rebuilding the bridge or the tunnel, and due to the proximity of Vulture Street, it closed in 1978 with the opening of the Merivale Bridge.
