= Alexander Brown Wilson =

Australian architect

Alexander Brown Wilson (5 June 1857, in Glasgow, Scotland – 5 May 1938, in Kangaroo Point, Queensland, Australia) was an architect in Queensland, Australia. A number of his works are listed on the Queensland Heritage Register.

== Life ==
Alexander Wilson was the fourth son of George Wilson, a silk merchant, and Margaret Watson. The family lived at 168 St. Georges Road, Glasgow in 1861.

They migrated to the Colony of Queensland (Australia), arriving in July 1864 aboard the Lady Bowen. He began attending the Normal School.

Wilson began work with the Department of Public Works in 1875 and joined the architect F D G Stanley as principal draughtsman in 1882. From 1878, as a draughtsman to Colonel Peter H. Scratchley, Commissioner of Defences for the Australian colonies, Wilson prepared drawings for the Lytton Battery, of which Stanley was architect. Wilson won a competition for the design of the western façade of St Stephens Cathedral, Sydney and then travelled to Britain where he was admitted as an associate of the Royal Institute of British Architects. Back in Brisbane in 1884 he established his own practice. Wilson was successful in several competitions for ecclesiastical commissions, including the Wesleyan Church in West End (1884–85) and a belfry for St Stephen's Cathedral (1887).

Wilson married Ellen Martin, daughter of auctioneer and agent, Thomas Martin, on 3 September 1885 at Brisbane, Queensland. They had three sons and a daughter.

In the 1920s, Alexander Wilson was in partnership with his architect son Ronald Martin Wilson, who would later be in partnership with his architect son Blair, who would in turn partner with his son Hamilton, an architectural practice spanning 130 years (as of 2014, known as Wilson Architects).

== Works ==
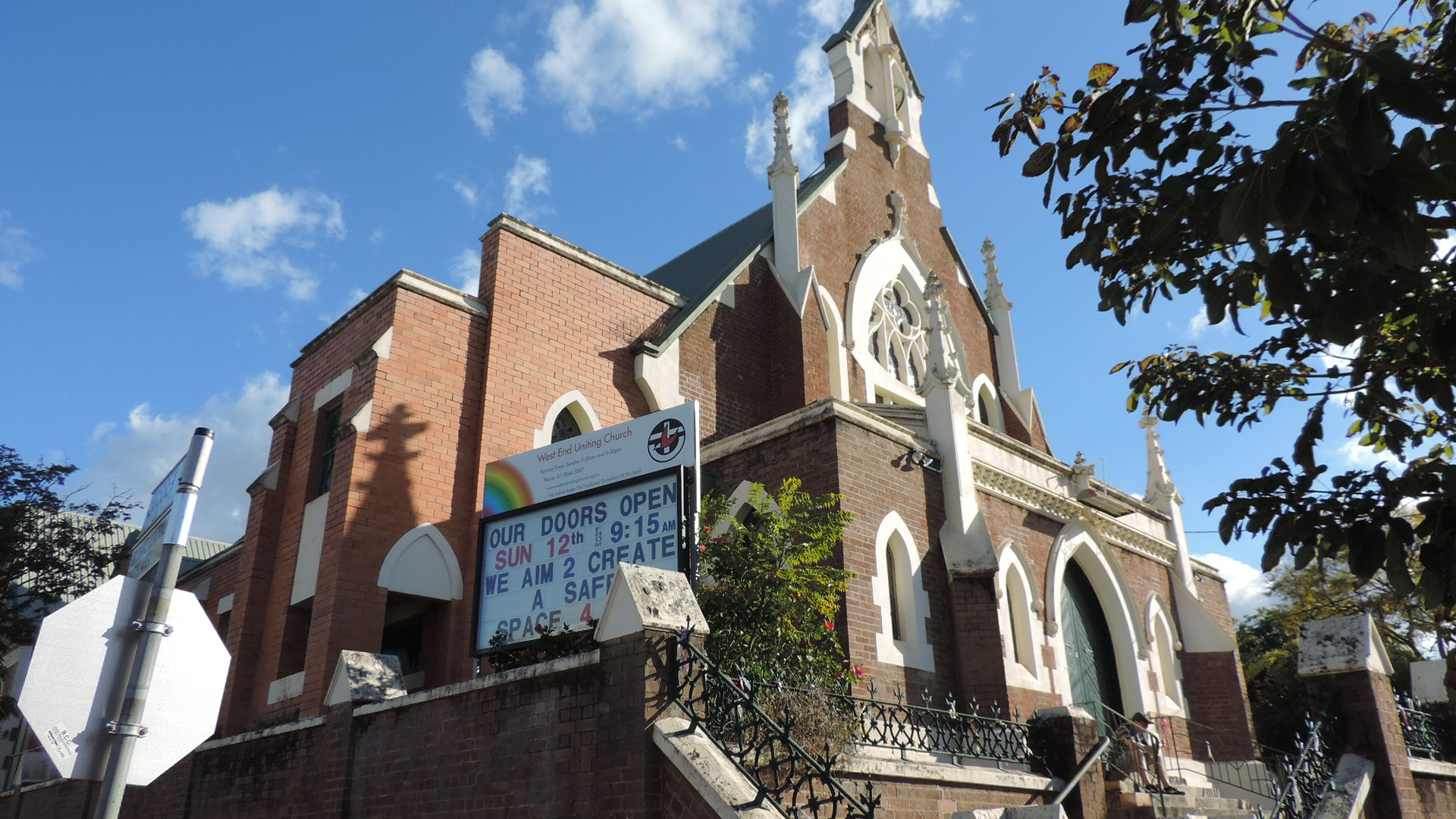
West End Uniting Church (formerly Methodist), 2020

His works include:

- Wesleyan Methodist Church, West End (1884)
- Plough Inn (1885)
- Mowbraytown Presbyterian Church (1885)
- Kinauld at Highgate Hill (1888)
- Leckhampton at Kangaroo Point (1889)
- Como (later Barrogill) at Yeronga (1889)
- Ann Street Presbyterian Church (alterations and extensions) (1897)
- Lamb House (also known as Home) at Kangaroo Point (1902)

== See also ==
- Category:Alexander Brown Wilson buildings
