= Leckhampton, Kangaroo Point =

Leckhampton
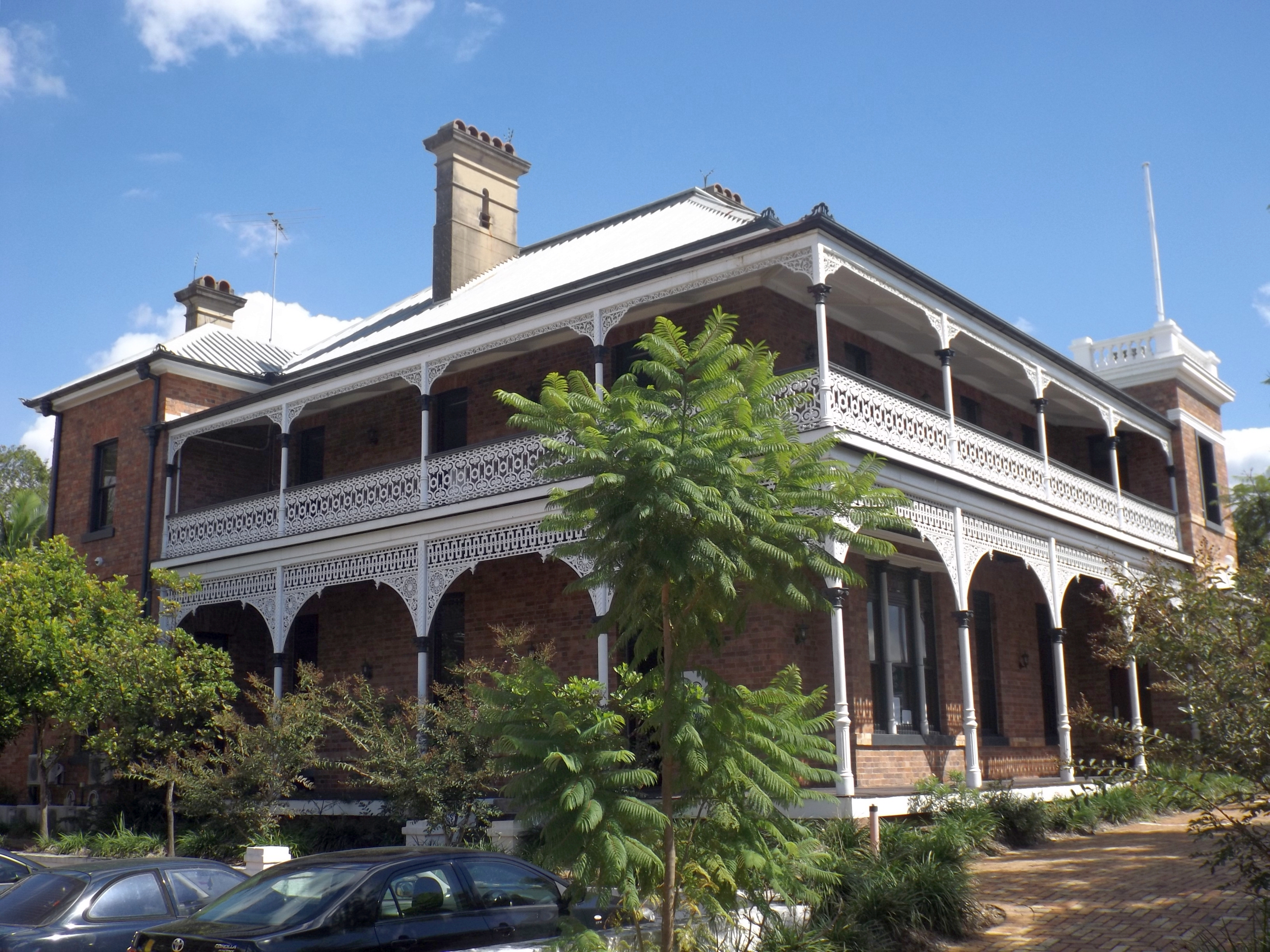
- Building in 2015

- Location within Queensland Location within Australia
- 27.4756°S 153.0367°E
- Location: 69 Shafston Avenue, Kangaroo Point, City of Brisbane, Queensland, Australia

History
- Design period: 1870s–1890s (late 19th century)
- Built: 1889–1890
- Built for: Charles William Snow

Site notes
- Architect: Alexander Brown Wilson
- Architectural style: Victorian Filigree

Queensland Heritage Register
- Official name: Leckhampton
- Type: state heritage (built)
- Designated: 21 October 1992
- Reference no.: 600246
- Significant period: 1880s/1890s (fabric, historical)
- Significant components: residential accommodation – main house, lookout /observation deck, stained glass window/s

Leckhampton is a heritage-listed villa at 69 Shafston Avenue, Kangaroo Point, City of Brisbane, Queensland, Australia. It was designed by Alexander Brown Wilson and built from 1889 to 1890 for Charles William Snow. It was added to the Queensland Heritage Register on 21 October 1992.

== History ==
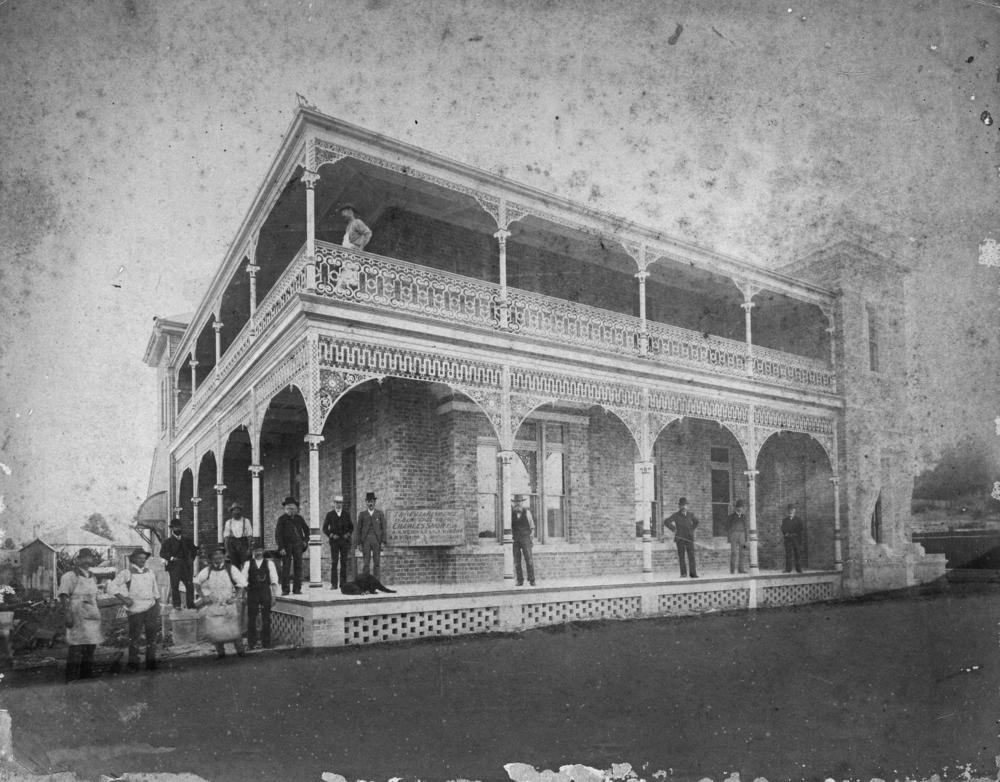
Leckhampton, circa 1895

Considered to be the work of noted architect Alexander B Wilson, Leckhampton was built for Charles William Snow shortly after he purchased the land in 1889. Snow was a prominent city jeweller (his son Charles Smethurst Snow was the founder of the Boy Scouts in Queensland). He died in 1913 and the house remained in the Snow family until 1924.

Leckhampton was owned by George and Jessie Hughes from 1924 to 1947.

Leckhampton was converted into flats by the 1960s. In 1984, the building was refurbished as office accommodation. As part of the redevelopment a similarly styled building was constructed next door.

== Description ==
Leckhampton is a two-storeyed brick house with a ribbed iron hipped roof. The front and south-east side of the house are sheltered on both levels by deep verandahs which feature decorative cast-iron balusters, columns and friezes. A square, double-storeyed bay, surmounted by a parapet, projects from the northern corner of the main facade. Entry is through a pedimented doorway which leads to a vestibule hall and stairway lit by an impressive stained glass window. Two single-storeyed enclosed verandahs have been added to the rear. A new paved entertainment and pool area behind the house link Leckhampton with the new building.

== Heritage listing ==
Leckhampton was listed on the Queensland Heritage Register on 21 October 1992 having satisfied the following criteria.

The place is important in demonstrating the evolution or pattern of Queensland's history.

Leckhampton provides evidence of an expression of confidence during the 1880s by a prominent businessman and of the earlier affluent residential character of parts of Kangaroo Point.

The place is important in demonstrating the principal characteristics of a particular class of cultural places.

Leckhampton is significant as an externally intact and aesthetically pleasing example of a large, late nineteenth century, city residence on the southside.

The place is important because of its aesthetic significance.

Leckhampton is significant as an externally intact and aesthetically pleasing example of a large, late nineteenth century, city residence on the southside.
