= Kinauld =

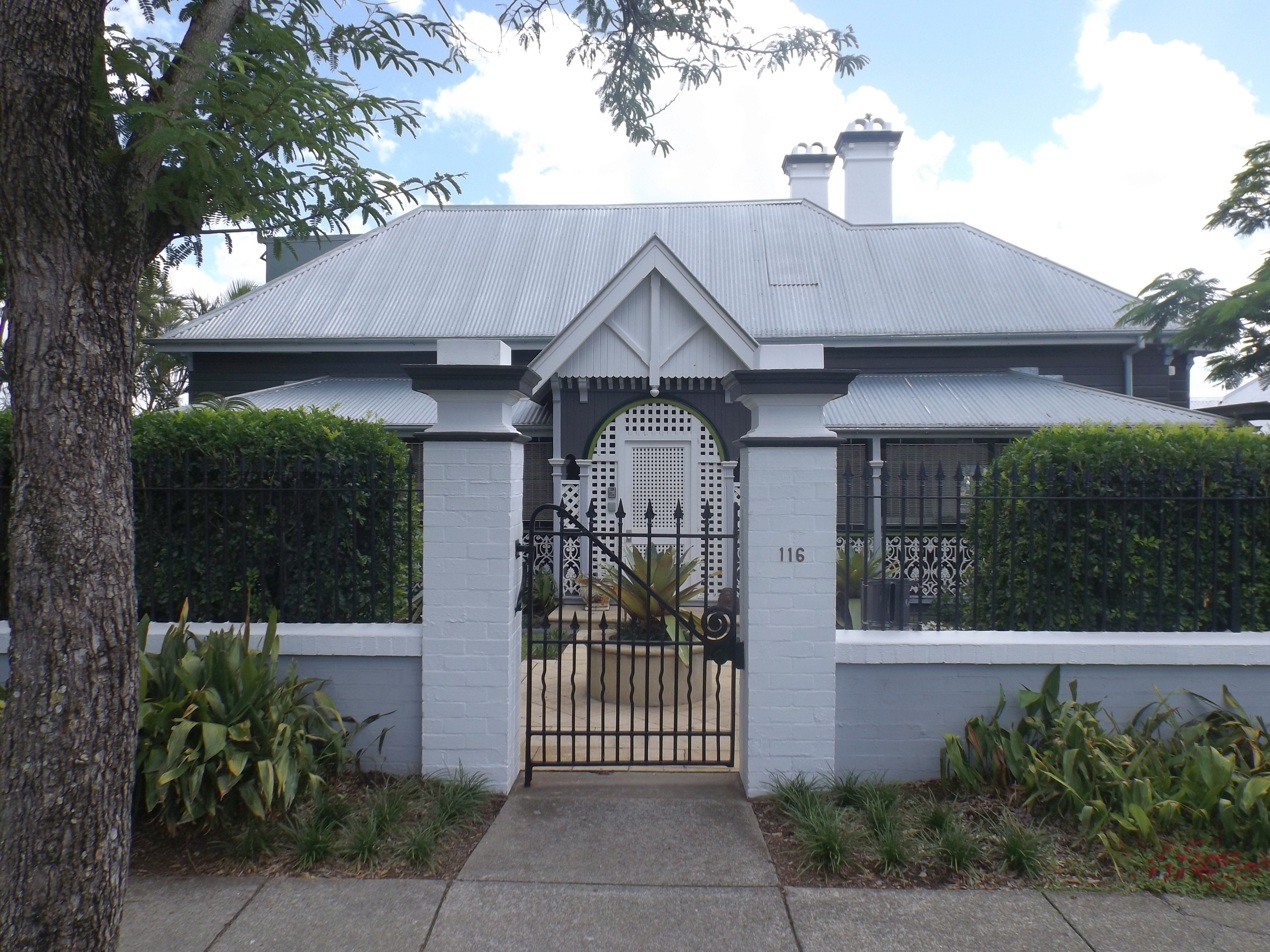
- Residence in 2015

- Location within Queensland Location within Australia
- 27.4869°S 153.0134°E
- Location: 116 Dornoch Terrace, Highgate Hill, City of Brisbane, Queensland, Australia

History
- Design period: 1870s–1890s (late 19th century)
- Built: 1888–1889

Site notes
- Architect: Alexander Brown Wilson

Queensland Heritage Register
- Official name: Kinauld
- Type: state heritage (built)
- Designated: 21 October 1992
- Reference no.: 600225
- Significant period: 1880s (fabric, historical)
- Significant components: basement / sub-floor, residential accommodation – main house

Kinauld is a heritage-listed detached house at 116 Dornoch Terrace, Highgate Hill, City of Brisbane, Queensland, Australia. It was designed by Alexander Brown Wilson and built from 1888 to 1889. It was added to the Queensland Heritage Register on 21 October 1992.

== History ==
This timber and corrugated iron hill-top house was erected in 1888 for the widow of Alexander Macintosh.

Alexander Macintosh came to Brisbane from Scotland in 1865 with his wife and family of nine children. In 1866 he purchased the site and built a simple timber dwelling, which he called Kinauld. Mackintosh died in 1877, but in 1888 his wife commissioned Brisbane architect Alexander B Wilson to design the present Kinauld, immediately behind the first.

Macintosh descendants owned the dwelling until 1953, occupying the house until the late 1930s. During the Second World War it was rented by HW Herbert, manager of Queensland Trustees.

Subsequent owners made many internal alterations: marble fireplaces, cedar fittings and stained glass were removed, ceilings were sheeted with asbestos, verandahs enclosed, rooms modified and the rear verandah's cast-iron balustrading sold off.

Restoration by current owners includes reconstructing the front facade, front door and ceilings, and replacing fittings.

== Description ==
Kinauld is a large timber house built on a steeply sloping site. It is square in plan with a single-storey at street level and two-storeys at the rear. The twin hipped roof with valley is clad in corrugated iron.

The front verandah has a hipped roof, cast-iron balustrades and timber venetians. The central frontispiece has a gabled pediment. The chamfered board walls are broken by pairs of step-out windows either side of the central front door.

The plan of the main floor is most innovative, with all rooms except the drawing room opening off a central room or circulation space that has no windows. The front door opens onto a short hall with two doors, one of which leads to the central room. The right hand door opens on to the large front drawing room which has pairs of step-out windows that provide egress to the front and eastern verandahs and a bay window.

Walls and ceilings were lath and plaster, while skirting boards, doors and architraves were cedar.

The sub-floor was composed of a kitchen, dining room, laundry and store room.

Externally Kinauld presents a substantially intact colonial facade.

== Heritage listing ==
Kinauld was listed on the Queensland Heritage Register on 21 October 1992 having satisfied the following criteria.

The place is important in demonstrating the evolution or pattern of Queensland's history.

Kinauld, constructed in 1888, survives as one of Brisbane's commanding hilltop houses and is important for its association with the early settlement of Highgate Hill.

The place is important in demonstrating the principal characteristics of a particular class of cultural places.

As an accomplished building of innovative form and unusual style, it is a fine example of the early domestic work of Brisbane architect Alexander B Wilson.

The place is important because of its aesthetic significance.

Kinauld, as one of the Brisbane's commanding hilltop houses, contributes significantly to the South Brisbane/Highgate Hill townscape and to the historic streetscape of Dornoch Terrace.

The place has a special association with the life or work of a particular person, group or organisation of importance in Queensland's history.

Kinauld is also important for its association with the Macintosh family.
