= Highgate Hill, Queensland =

Highgate Hill
- Suburb
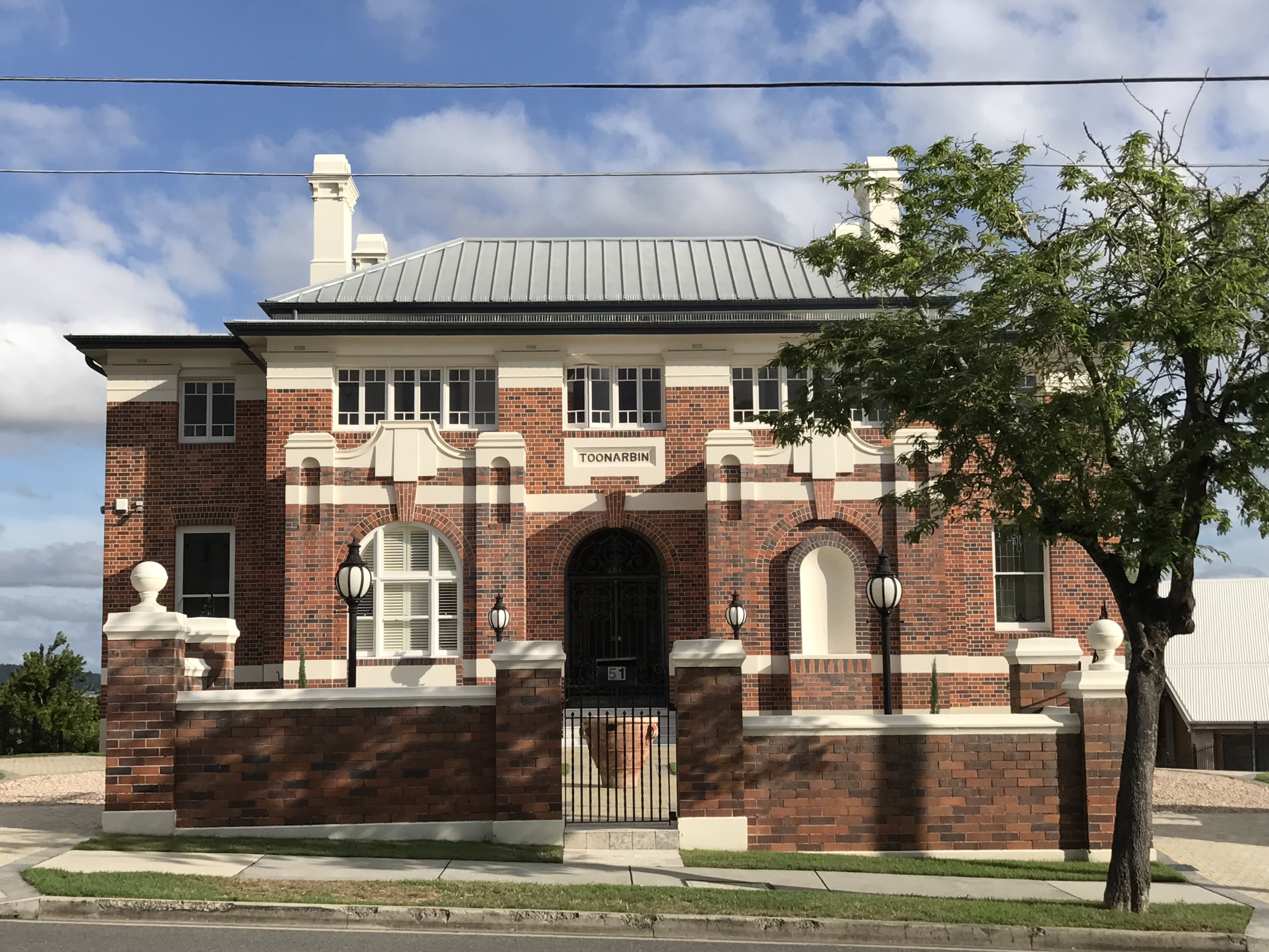
- Toonarbin, Highgate Hill

- Interactive map of Highgate Hill
- Coordinates: 27.4872°S 153.0191°E
- Country: Australia
- State: Queensland
- City: Brisbane
- LGA: City of Brisbane (The Gabba Ward)
- Location: 4.5 km (2.8 mi) SSW of Brisbane CBD

Government
  - State electorate: South Brisbane
  - Federal division: Griffith

Area
  - Total: 1.3 km^{2} (0.50 sq mi)
- Elevation: 60 m (200 ft)

Population
  - Total: 6,229 (2021 census)
  - Density: 4,790/km^{2} (12,400/sq mi)
- Time zone: UTC+10:00 (AEST)
- Postcode: 4101
Suburbs around Highgate Hill
| West End | South Brisbane | South Brisbane |
| West End | Highgate Hill | South Brisbane |
| St Lucia | St Lucia | Dutton Park |

Highgate Hill is a riverside inner southern suburb of the City of Brisbane, Queensland, Australia. In the 2021 census, Highgate Hill had a population of 6,229 people.

== Geography ==
The topography of the suburb is undulating hills, the highest being the hill (27.4870°S 153.01667°E) also called Highgate Hill at 64 metres (210 ft) above sea level. Together with West End and South Brisbane, it occupies a peninsula surrounded on three sides by the Brisbane River with the river forming the southern boundary of Highgate Hill. From the central ridge occupied by Dornoch Terrace, land slopes steeply down towards the river to the south and north towards low-lying land of the two adjacent suburbs. To the east, further hilly land extends past Gladstone Road.

Highgate Hill is a high-density residential suburb with many apartment buildings, some more than 10 storeys. These apartment blocks are centred along the main road of Dornoch Terrace, a trend that was started in 1960 by the landmark Torbreck building.

== History ==
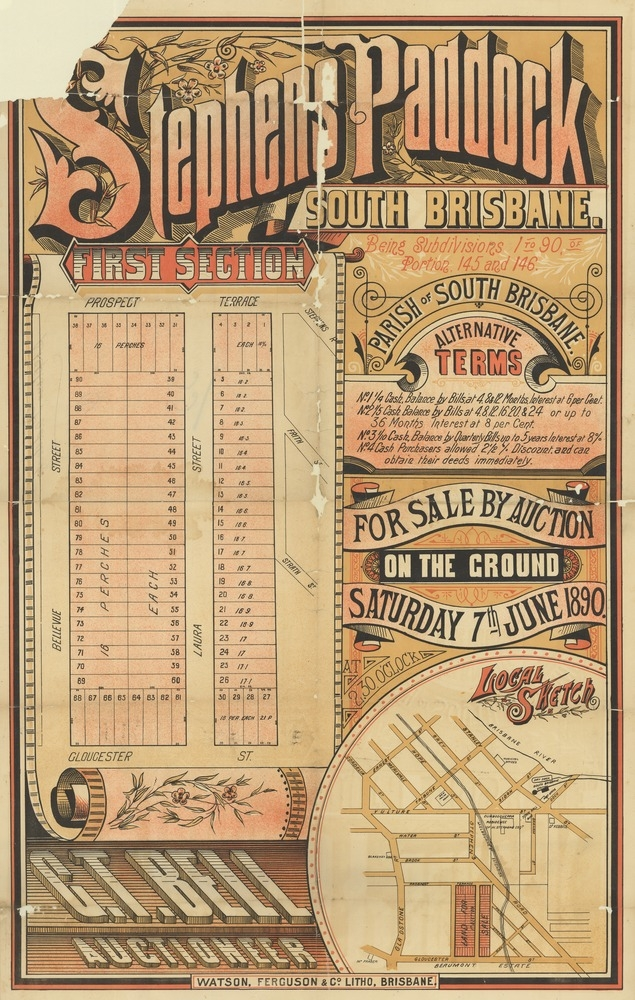
Real estate map of Stephens Paddock Estate (first section), Highgate Hill, 1890

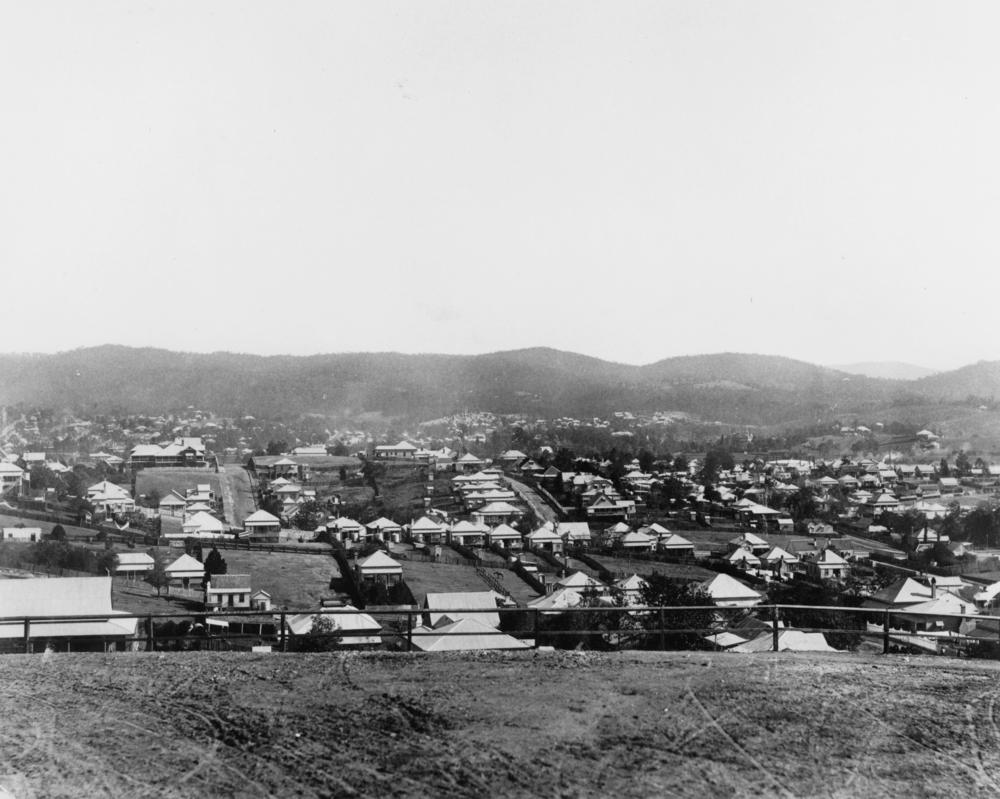
View of Highgate Hill c.1902

Before British settlement, the Highgate Hill area was a hunting ground for indigenous people from nearby camping grounds, such as the one at the base of Highgate Hill. Up until the late 1850s this camp, near Dorchester Street and Somerville House School, continued to be used. A corroboree ground was located at "the pineapple paddock" in Baynes Street. The name of the Highgate Hill area in the Turrbal or Jagara language was Beenung-urrung which meant frilled lizard.

The banks of the Brisbane River were described as a tropic wall of tall figs, emergent hoop pine, vines, flowering creepers, staghorns, elkhorns, towering scrub palms, giant ferns, and hundreds of other varieties of ferns, beautiful and rare orchids, and wild passion flower. Remnants of this vegetation exist in a number gullies in Highgate Hill leading to the river.

In convict times, saw pits existed in the area along the river between Dauphin Terrace and Boundary Street. Convicts felled timber on Highgate Hill for use in the fledgling town of Brisbane.

Among the first European residents was George Wilson and his wife and family of 8 who built a homestead in Bellevue Street in the 1860s. He is thought to have named the locality Highgate Hill (possibly after Highgate Hill in London), however the name first appears in an advertisement for a land sale in 1864 by Nehemiah Bartley of the "Highgate Hill Estate" located at the peak of the hill. The large portions of land from early land sales were slowly subdivided into residential blocks, and advertisements mentioned the notable residents of the area to emphasise its attractiveness. However the lack of water proved to be an obstacle to significant take up. Water had to be collected in rain water tanks when possible or fetched from springs in the West End area. This problem was solved by the completion in 1889 of the Highgate Hill Service Reservoir near the corner of Dornoch Terrace and Gladstone Road. The reservoir is still in use today.

In 1902, the electric tram was extended up Gladstone Road, stimulating suburban growth. By 1929 the area was considered one of Brisbane's dress circles.

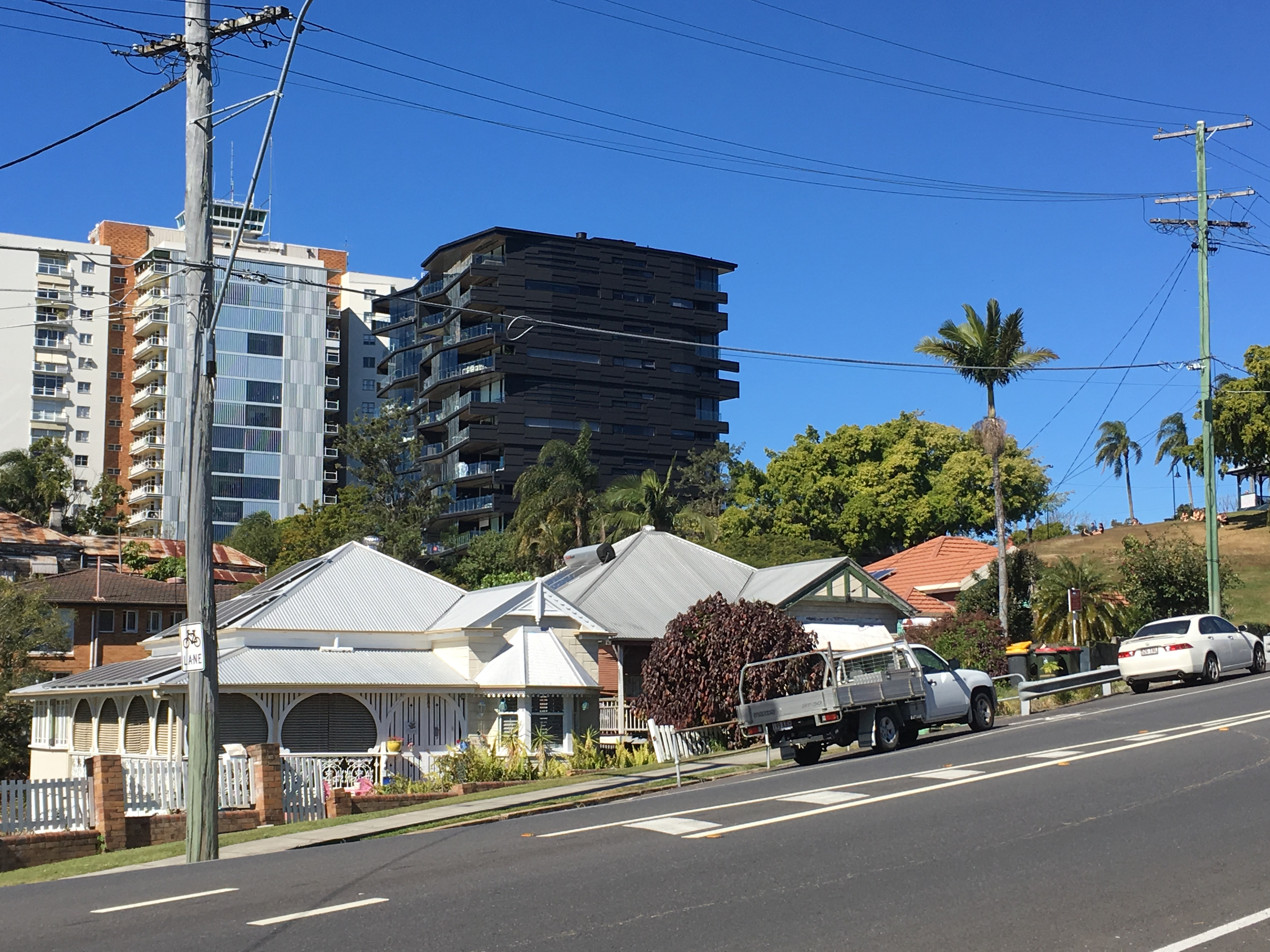
Highgate Hill, a mix of old and new, 2017

The density of the suburb began to increase with redevelopment and the building of flats during the interwar years. Westbourne Street provides a good example of the redevelopment of large properties in this period.

On 10 December 1949, the foundation stone of the Park Presbyterian Church was laid at 21 Hampstead Road (27.4827°S 153.0160°E). The congregation had previously had their church at 31 Glenelg Street on the corner of Cordelia Street in South Brisbane but the changing demographic of South Brisbane into an industrial area saw families move away to more residential suburbs and so the decision was made to build a new church in the more residential suburb of Highgate Hill. The name "Park" was carried over from the previous church which had been located opposite Musgrave Park. When the Presbyterian church entered into the union that created the Uniting Church in Australia in the 1970s, this resulted in an oversupply of church buildings in many communities. In September 1976 the Park Presbyterian church became the Park Uniting Church for the Brisbane Tongan congregation.

Development continued after the Second World War with the notable construction of the 22-floor Torbreck, Brisbane's first apartment tower, on Dornoch Terrace in 1962.

Continued development has led to community protest at times. In 2002, there was an extended protest over the development of two hectares of bushland, known as the Gully, when a developer obtained a permit for nearly 30 dwellings to be built on it. In 2016, there was community protest over the demolition of three heritage houses in Jones Street which had not been given heritage listing by the Brisbane City Council.

== Demographics ==
In the 2011 census, Highgate Hill recorded a population of 5,824 people, 48.7% female and 51.3% male. The median age of the Highgate Hill population was 34 years of age, 3 years below the Australian median. 59.2% of people living in Highgate Hill were born in Australia, compared to the national average of 69.8%; the next most common countries of birth were England 3.9%, Greece 3.8%, New Zealand 3%, China 1.8%, India 1.7%. 66.3% of people spoke only English at home; the next most common languages were 7.9% Greek, 2.5% Mandarin, 1.7% Vietnamese, 1.6% Spanish, 1% French.

In the 2016 census, Highgate Hill had a population of 6,194 people.

In the 2021 census, Highgate Hill had a population of 6,229 people.

== Transport ==
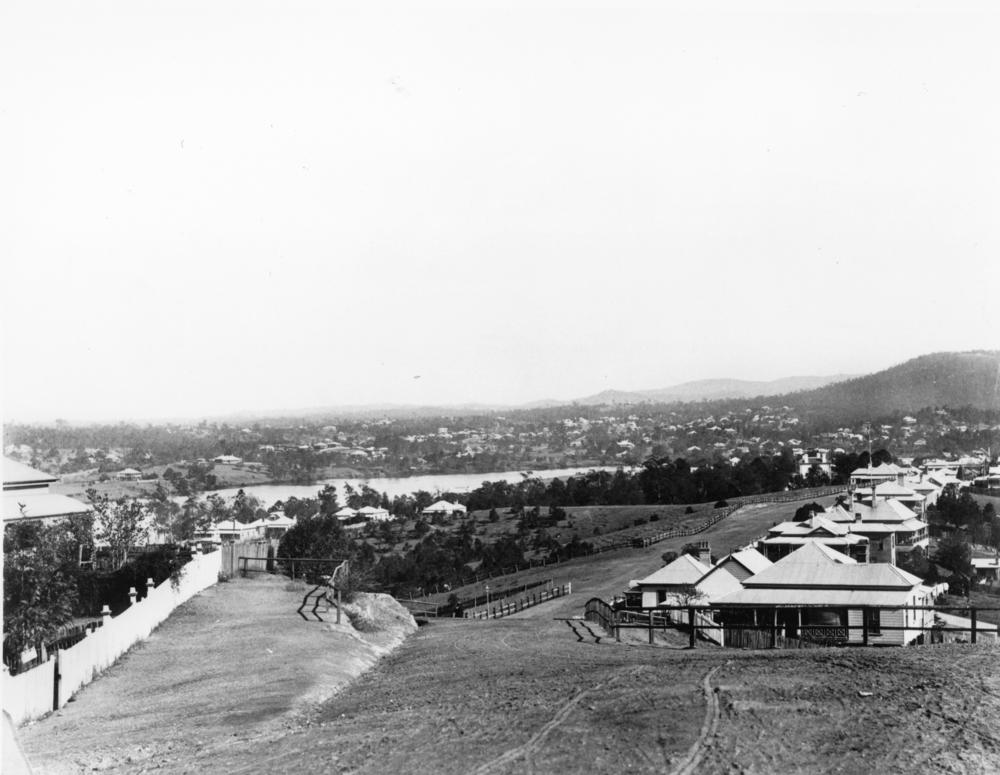
The view down Dornoch Terrace in 1902 showing development along the ridge and near the river

Highgate Hill is regularly serviced by a number of bus routes operated by the Brisbane City Council. All residents live within walking distance to public transport, with 4.4% using public transport to commute to work or school.

Bus routes include:

- Number 192 UQ Lakes – Highgate Hill – City
- Number 196 New Farm – Fairfield Gardens
- Number 198 Highgate Hill Hail and Ride local bus

The nearest train stations to Highgate Hill are at South Bank railway station and Dutton Park railway station. On the eastern side of the suburb Gloucester Street railway station once provided better rail access. The station was removed in 1978, with little indication of its existence remaining.

== Education ==
There are no schools in Highgate Hill.

The nearest government primary schools are West End State School in neighbouring West End to the west and Dutton Park State School in neighbouring Dutton Park to the south-east.

The nearest government secondary schools are Brisbane State High School (to Year 12) in neighbouring South Brisbane to the north and Brisbane South State Secondary College (to Year 10) in neighbouring Dutton Park. As Brisbane South State Secondary College opened in 2021, as at 2024, it offers only Years 7 to 10, expanding to Year 11 in 2025 and Year 12 in 2026.

There are also a number of private schools in surrounding suburbs.

== Amenities ==
Park Church Tongan Congregation is at 21-23 Hampstead Road (27.4827°S 153.0160°E). It is part of the Moreton Rivers Presbytery of the Uniting Church in Australia.

== Parks ==
At the highest point of Highgate Hill is a small park which boasts excellent views of the city and surrounding hills. It's particularly popular during summer due to the cool breezes.

Lyons Playground Park, also known as Paradise Park, is a well equipped small park that also has a community garden.

The Brydon Street park leads into a gully down to the river and is what remains of the bushland that was subject to protest in 2002.

== Highgate Hill in literature and art ==
The 1994 novel for children, ''The Highgate Hill Mob'' relates the escapades of four kids who live in the suburb of Highgate Hill.

The artist Stephen Nothling lived in Louise Street, Highgate Hill and painted a series of pictures depicting houses in the street.

The poet Robert Hughes lived in Jones Street. He wrote his book "Highgate Hill" based on this experience.

== Heritage listings ==
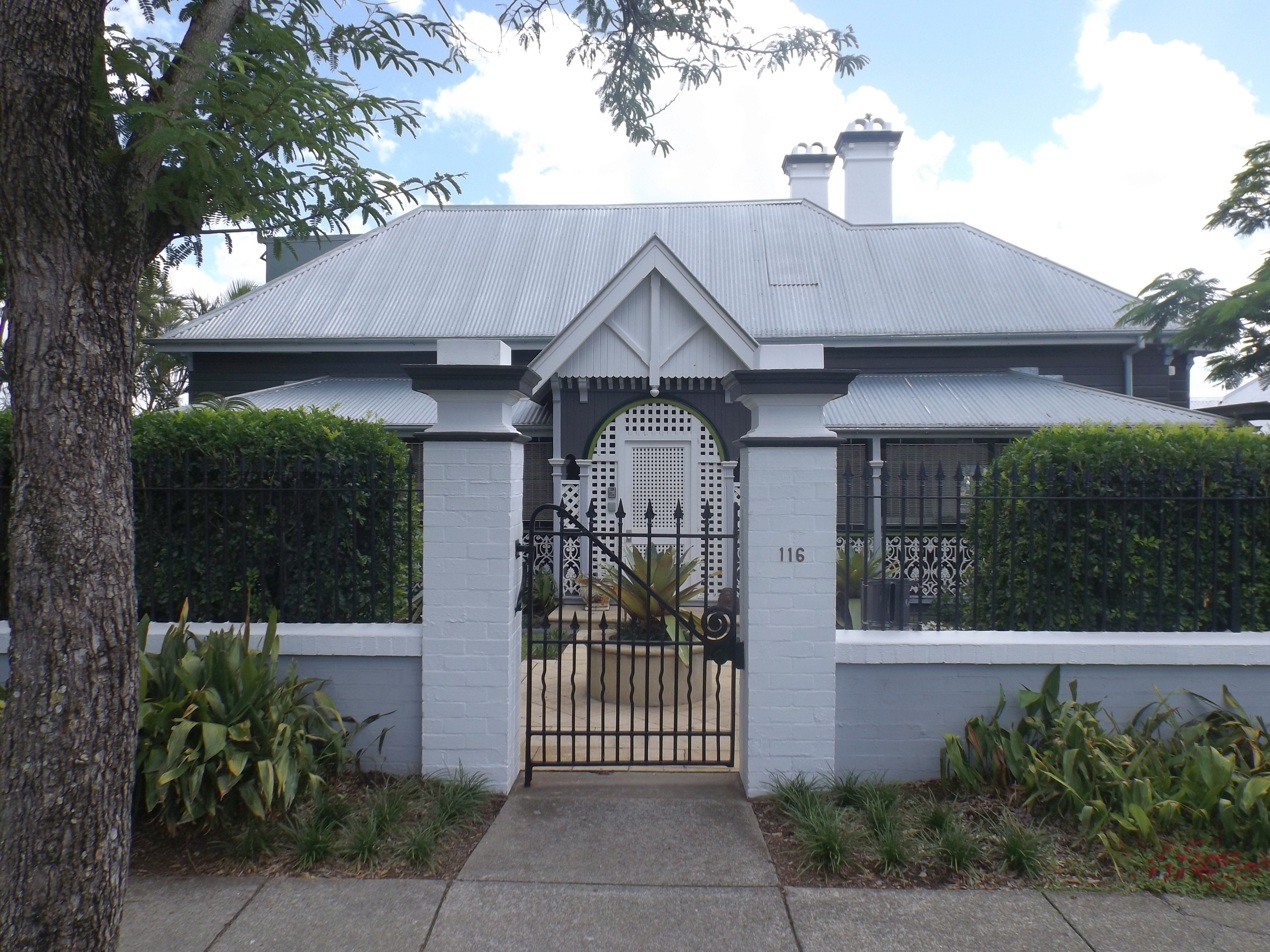
Entrance to the Kinauld residence on Dornoch Terrace, 2015

Highgate Hill has a number of heritage-listed sites, including:

- 14–20 Blakeney Street: Rochemount/Tarong
- 35 Brighton Road: Franklin Villa
- 81 Dornoch Terrace: Topham Residence
- 100 Dornoch Terrace: Cleona
- 116 Dornoch Terrace: Kinauld
- 117 Dornoch Terrace: Carinya
- 121 Dornoch Terrace: Lutmis
- 132 Dornoch Terrace: Glenview
- 147 Dornoch Terrace: Giles Residence
- 182 Dornoch Terrace: Torbreck
- 191 Dornoch Terrace: Fire hydrant
- 11 Franklin Street: Merkara
- 17 Franklin Street: Allawah
- 21 Franklin Street: Eversly
- 21 & 23 Gladstone Road: Orana
- 113 Gladstone Road: Highgate Hill Reservoir
- 3 Hampstead Road: Carmel Court
- 27 Hampstead Road: Wairuna
- 94 Hampstead Road: Highgate Hill Park
- 1 & 3 Marly Street: Barne
- 25 Sexton Street: Nott cottage
- 11 Westbourne Street: Lanark
- 15 Westbourne Street: Le Jardin
- 19, 23 & 27 Westbourne Street: Front Fence Remnant from 'Tarong'

== Notable people ==
The following notable people have an association with Highgate Hill:

- James Allan (politician and retailer) – residence Wairuna
- Ron Archer (cricketer) – birth
- Benjamin Harris Babbidge (alderman and mayor) – residence
- William Theophilus Blakeney (registrar-general) – residence
- Bill Hayden (former Governor-General of Australia, politician) – birth and early years
- Daphne Mayo (artist, sculptor) – residence
- John McLaren (cricketer) – death
- Edmund Sheppard (judge) – residence
- Alfred Jeffris Turner (pediatrician and entomologist) – residence
- Andrew Joseph Thynne (lawyer and politician) – residence
- Alexander Brown Wilson (architect) – early residence

== See also ==
- List of Brisbane suburbs
