= Timeline of Gold Coast, Queensland =

Coordinates: 28.016667°S 153.4°E

The following is a timeline of history of the city of Gold Coast, Queensland, Australia.

== 19th Century ==
- Pre 1846
  - Yugambeh people inhabit the region now known as the Gold Coast.
- 1846
  - The schooner Coolangatta is wrecked on the coast close to the later town.
- 1865
  - The township of Nerang was surveyed by Martin Lavelle in June.
- 1874
  - The town of Southport is founded.
- 1875
  - Johan Meyer buys land near Nerang River and begins developing sugar and transportation.
- 1883
  - The town of Coolangatta is founded.
- 1889
  - The South Coast railway reaches Southport.
- 1892
  - Catholic parish of Southport established.

== 20th Century ==
- 1901
  - The Southport School established.
- 1902
  - Pacific Cable Station opened, connecting Australia to North America by telegraph.
- 1912
  - St Hilda's School established.
- 1914
  - Yatala Pie Shop opens.
- 1919
  - The 1918 flu pandemic closes the QLD-NSW border.
- 1922
  - Southport War Memorial built.
- 1925
  - Opening of the Jubilee Bridge, connecting Elston to Southport.
  - Jim Cavill opens Surfers Paradise Hotel.
- 1928
  - Jazzland Dance Hall opened at Coolangatta.
- 1933
  - The town of Elston is officially renamed Surfers Paradise.
- 1934
  - Broadbeach is surveyed.
- 1938
  - Hotel Cecil in Art Deco style opened at Southport.
- 1939
  - First passenger flights from Coolangatta Airport (later Gold Coast Airport).
- 1947
  - Currumbin Bird Sanctuary (later Currumbin Wildlife Sanctuary) opens.
- 1949
  - Town of South Coast created through the amalgamation of Coolangatta and Southport.
  - 10 March: 1949 Queensland Airlines Lockheed Lodestar crash in Bilinga.
- 1954
  - An unnamed cyclone hits, leading to at least 26 deaths and extensive flooding.
- 1956
  - Soviet defector Vladimir Petrov arrested in Surfers Paradise while drunk.
- 1958
  - Town of South Coast renamed to Town of Gold Coast.
- 1959
  - Town of Gold Coast renamed City of Gold Coast.
  - Isle of Capri canal development under way.
- 1960
  - Gold Coast Hospital opened.
  - Kinkabool (building) constructed in Surfers Paradise.
- 1962
  - Lido Arcade in Surfers Paradise opens.
  - Magic Mountain, Nobby Beach opens.
- 1963
  - Gold Coast Bulletin newspaper in publication.
- 1964
  - Southport-Brisbane South Coast railway line closes.
  - Kirra surfer Phyllis O'Donnell wins first Women's World Surfing Championship.
- 1965
  - Entrepreneur Bernie Elsey organises Surfers Paradise Meter Maids to save motorists from parking fines.
- 1966
  - The Sands (building) and Paradise Towers constructed in Surfers Paradise.
  - Gold Coast Bridge rebuilt.
- 1967
  - Garfield Towers built in Surfers Paradise.
  - Bruce Small elected mayor.
- 1971
  - Sea World park opens in Southport.
  - Point Danger Light built.
  - Population: 75,862.
- 1973
  - Robert Neumann elected mayor.
  - Billabong surfwear founded.
- 1974
  - Currumbin Estuary Bridge opens.
  - Surfers Paradise floods.
- 1976
  - Death of Gladys Moncrieff at Pindara Private Hospital
- 1979
  - Gold Coast Marathon begins.
- 1980
  - First Schoolies week celebrated, centred on Broadbeach Hotel
- 1981
  - Dreamworld amusement park in business in Coomera.
  - Population: 177,264.
- 1983
  - Ray Barrett stars in Goodbye Paradise as washed-up ex-policeman investigating crime.
- 1984
  - The Coolangatta Gold ironman race begins.
  - Cade's County Waterpark in business in Oxenford.
  - Coolangatta Centenary commemorations.
- 1985
  - Conrad Jupiters Casino (later The Star Gold Coast) opens.
- 1986
  - Gold Coast City Art Gallery opens.
- 1987
  - Carrara Stadium opens.
  - Gold Coast College of Advanced Education established.
- 1988
  - Bond University opens in Robina.
  - Gated community of Sanctuary Cove opened with performance by Frank Sinatra.
- 1989
  - Gold Coast College of Advanced Education is merged with Griffith University under the Dawkins Revolution of tertiary education.
- 1990
  - Gold Coast and Albert Genealogical Society active.
  - Australia Fair shopping centre opens in Southport.
- 1991
  - Movie World amusement park opens in Oxenford.
  - Village Roadshow Studios begin operation.
  - Magic Mountain, Nobby Beach shuts its doors.
  - Population: 301,559.
- 1992
  - Peter Goldsworthy's comedic novel Honk If You Are Jesus set in fictional Gold Coast bible college.
- 1994
  - Muriel's Wedding's fictional Porpoise Spit shot in Coolangatta and other Gold Coast locations.
  - Teen model Kristy Hinze appears in Vogue Australia.
- 1995
  - Shire of Albert becomes part of Gold Coast City.
  - Ray Stevens becomes mayor.
  - Yugambeh Museum, Language and Heritage Research Centre opens.
  - BusTech company formed to manufacture buses.
- 1996
  - Moroccan (building) constructed in Surfers Paradise.
- 1997
  - Gary Baildon becomes mayor.
- 1999
  - Gold Coast Sporting Hall of Fame opens.

== 21st Century ==
- 2000
  - Palazzo Versace Australia hotel in business.
  - Towers of Chevron Renaissance and Pacific Motorway built.
- 2001
  - First series of reality TV show Big Brother shot at Dreamworld compound.
- 2004
  - Ron Clarke becomes mayor.
  - Gold Coast Convention and Exhibition Centre opens in Broadbeach.
- 2005
  - Q1 (building) constructed.
- 2006
  - The Wave (building) constructed.
  - First series of teen fantasy TV drama H2O: Just Add Water.
  - WhiteWater World water park opened.
- 2007
  - Gold Coast Titans rugby club formed.
  - Circle on Cavill and Southport Central built.
- 2008
  - November: 2008 Queensland storms.
  - Robina Stadium opens.
- 2009
  - Gold Coast Football Club formed.
- 2010
  - The Oracle constructed.
- 2011
  - Australian Sevens rugby contest relocates to Gold Coast.
  - Population: 557,822 (urban agglomeration).
- 2012
  - Soul (building) constructed.
  - Tom Tate becomes mayor.
- 2013
  - City Plan drafted.
  - Gold Coast University Hospital built by Griffith University.
- 2014
  - The G:link light rail is built.
  - Factual TV series Gold Coast Cops follows police work.
- 2016
  - Four killed in accident on Thunder River Rapids Ride at Dreamworld.
- 2018
  - 4–15 April: 2018 Commonwealth Games hosted by the city.
- 2023
  - Four killed in mid-air helicopter collision.
- 2025
  - Damage from Cyclone Alfred.
- 2026
  - Several members of Iranian women's national women's football team defect to Australia.

== See also ==
- History of Gold Coast, Queensland
- List of mayors of Gold Coast
- List of films shot on the Gold Coast
- List of tallest buildings on the Gold Coast
- List of schools in Gold Coast, Queensland

== Bibliography ==
- P. Mullins (1984), P. Williams (ed.), "Hedonism and real estate - resort tourism and Gold Coast development", Urban Studies Yearbook, vol. 2, Sydney
- P. Mullins (1990), "Tourist Cities as New Cities: Australia's Gold Coast and Sunshine Coast", Australian Planner, 28, doi:10.1080/07293682.1990.9657471
- Joseph Hajdu (1993). "The Gold Coast, Australia: Spatial Model of Its Development and the Impact of the Cycle of Foreign Investment in Property during the Late 1980s". Erdkunde. 47. JSTOR 25646442.
- Margo Daly; et al. (1997), "Southeast Queensland: Gold Coast", Australia (3rd ed.), Rough Guides, p. 330+, OL 24375556M
- "Tall Buildings Brochure". Gold Coast Heritage: Publications. Gold Coast City Council. 1997.
- "50 Years: a Timeline", Gold Coast Bulletin (Paradise ed.), Australia, 16 May 2009 – via LexisNexis Academic (subscription required)
