= List of tallest buildings on the Gold Coast =

Skyline of the Gold Coast
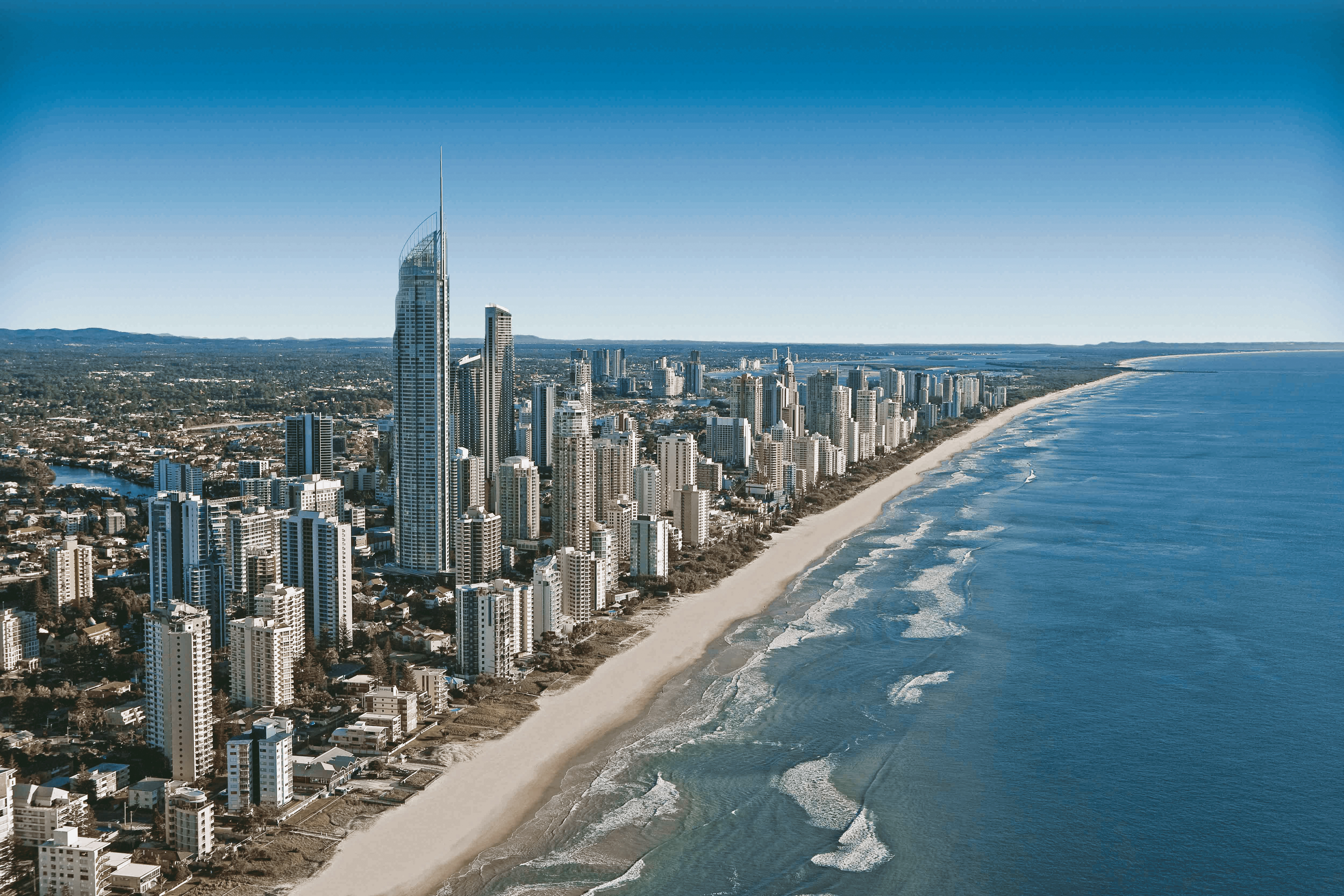
- The skyline along Broadbeach in 2015
- Tallest building: Q1 (2005)
- Tallest building height: 323 m (1,060 ft)
- First 150 m+ building: Skyline North Tower (2004)

Number of tall buildings (2026)
- Taller than 100 m (328 ft): 58
- Taller than 150 m (492 ft): 12
- Taller than 200 m (656 ft): 5
- Taller than 300 m (984 ft): 1

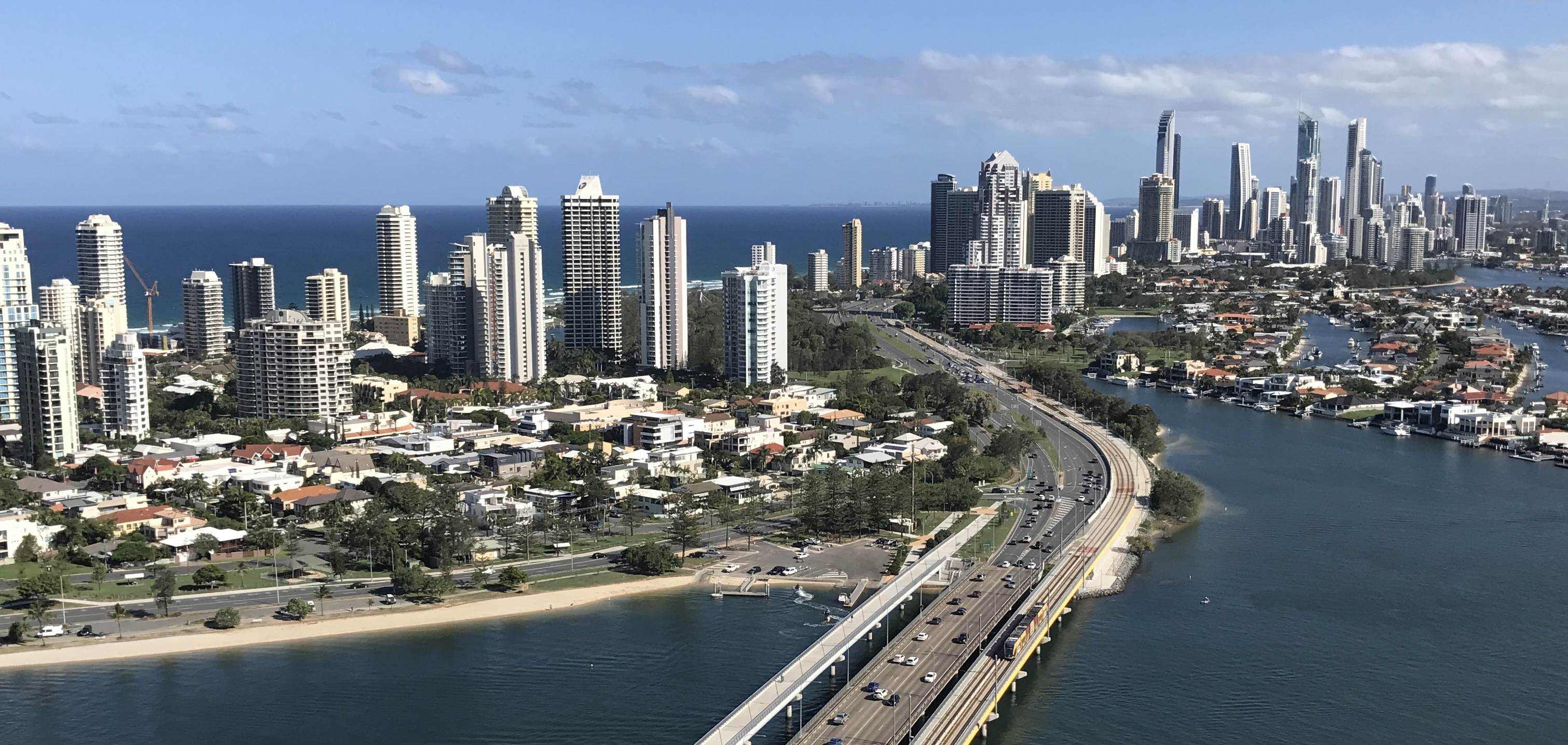
Main Beach and Surfers Paradise in 2017

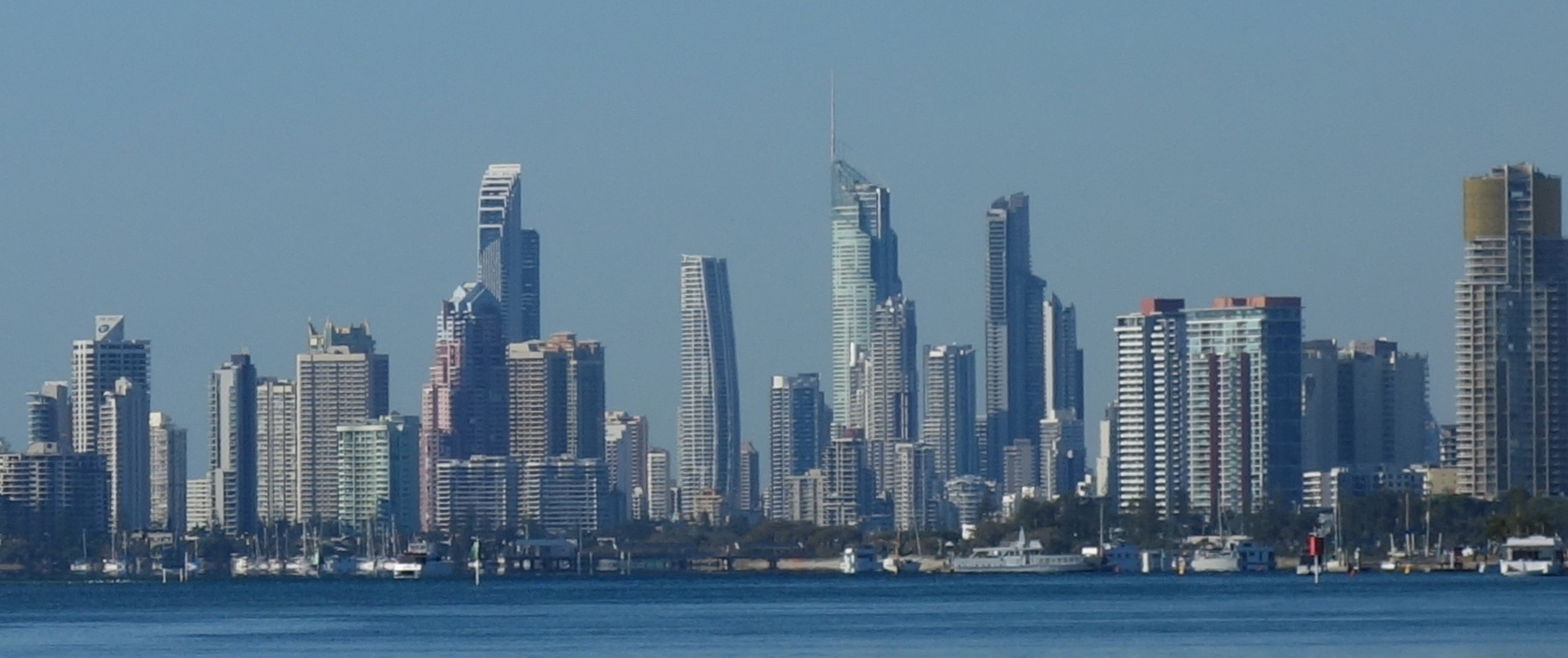
Surfers Paradise from the Broadwater

The Gold Coast is a coastal city in the Australian state of Queensland. It is the second-largest city in the state after the capital, Brisbane, with a population of 753,000 as of 2026. The Gold Coast has a very large skyline relative to the city's population; despite being Australia's sixth largest city, (1,333 sq km LGA) the city has the fourth-greatest number of skyscrapers in Australia, after Sydney, Melbourne, and Brisbane. As of 2026, there are 58 high-rise buildings in the Gold Coast taller than 100 metres (328 ft), 12 of which with a height of 150 metres (492 ft) or more. The city has been home to Australia's tallest building, Q1, since 2005; the residential skyscraper stands at a height of 322.5 metres (1,058 ft), and is Australia's first supertall skyscraper.

The first high-rises appeared in the city in the 1960s and 1970s as it boomed as a leading tourist destination. An early residential tower was Breakfree Peninsula at a height of 137 m (449 ft), which was the city's tallest building from 1982 until 1992, when it was overtaken by The Grand Mariner, which was only 2 metres taller. In the 2000s, skyscraper development increased rapidly. Besides Q1, other new buildings during the boom include Chevron Renaissance and the Circle on Cavill complex. Development has continued into the 2010s and 2020s, with two of the city's five tallest buildings, Ocean and Epsilon, built since 2020. Under construction is Cypress Palms, a two-tower development, the taller of which will be the Gold Coast's second supertall skyscraper.

As a major tourist hotspot, most of the Gold Coast's high-rises are for residential and hotel purposes. The centre of the skyline is in the central suburb of Surfer's Paradise. The skyline is mainly located on a thin strip of land that runs north-south along the coast, bounded by the Coral Sea of the Pacific Ocean to the east, and the Nerang River and its multi-branched canal developments to the west. This continuous line of high-rises extends northwards to Main Beach and southwards towards Broadbeach. Additionally, there are developing clusters in Southport and along the coast in Burleigh Heads.

== History ==
Number of buildings by height on the Gold Coast by the end of each year. Click on the legend to toggle a specific height on or off. View chart definition.

=== 1950s–1970s ===
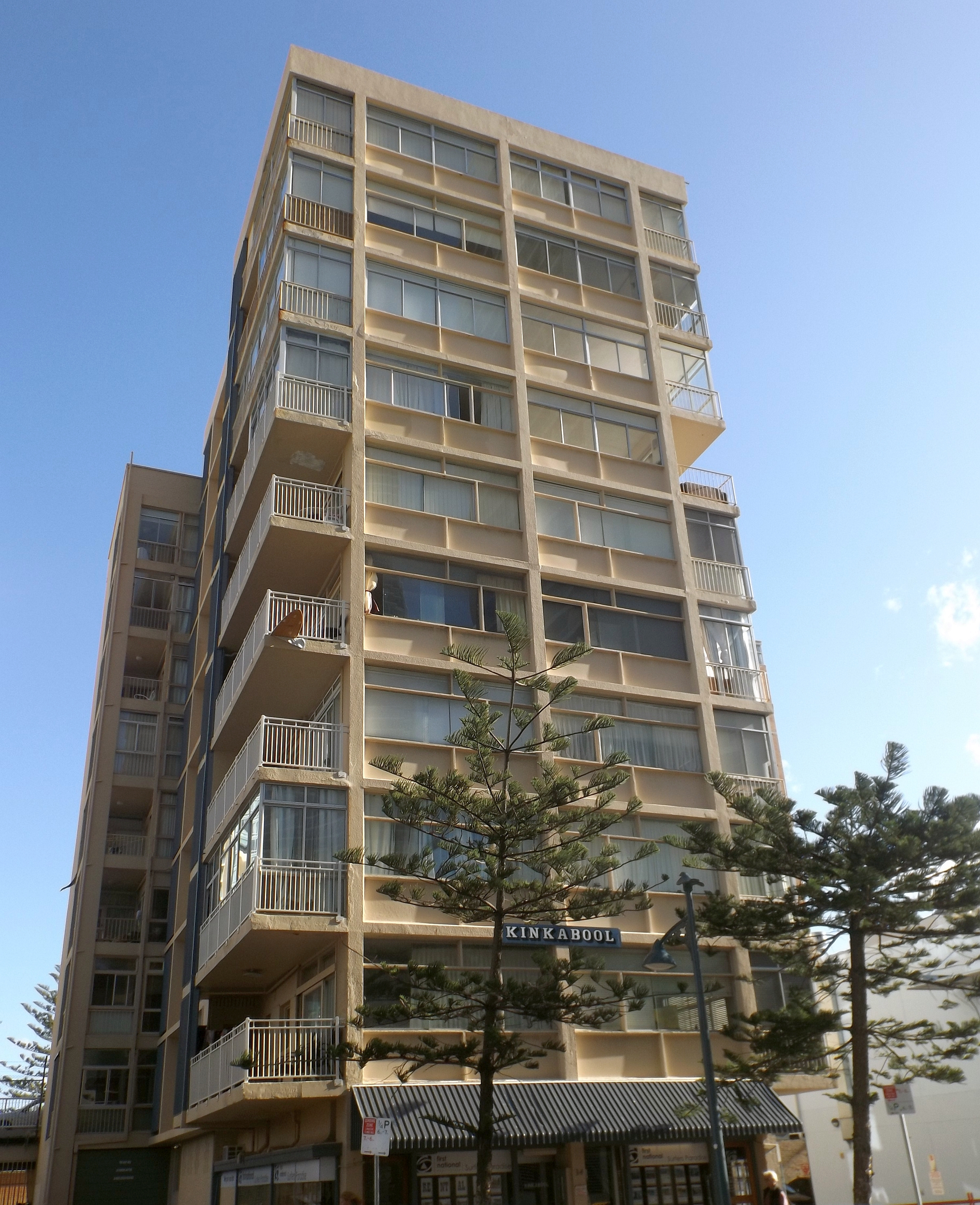
Kinkabool, the first high-rise on the Gold Coast

The coastal areas south of Brisbane, which became known as the South Coast, and eventually the Gold Coast, had been a destination for beach holidaymakers since the late 19th century. The area of Surfers Paradise was originally called Elston, but was changed to its current name in 1933 as the local council felt that it was more marketable. The Gold Coast region grew as a tourist destination, and became known for its beach tourist resorts. The first high-rise to be built in the city is considered to be Kinkabool, a ten-storey apartment building, completed between 1959 and 1960. This marked the beginning of a boom in high-rise holiday apartments and hotels.

The high-rise development boom continued in the 1970s. Focus, completed in 1976, was the first building to have over 30 stories and exceed a height of 100 metres (328 ft) in the city. The building's circular form resulted in the lifts being centrally located and the fire stars being built in an unusual ‘scissor’ style. Each one of the 123 units offered a 270 degree view of the surrounding coastline and hinterland, while a helipad designed rooftop provided the highest vantage point in Surfers Paradise at the time.

=== 1980s–1990s ===
The city's high-rise boom persisted in the 1980s, spurred by Japanese property investment and the opening of the Gold Coast Airport in 1981. Buildings that exceeded 100 m (328 ft) in height became increasingly more common, such as the Atlantis Apartments complex, Surfers Aquarius, and Breakfree Peninsula, which overtook Focus to be the Gold Coast's tallest building at 137 m (449 ft) in 1982.

Breakfree Peninsula was surpassed a decade later by The Grand Mariner at 139 m (456 ft), completed in 1992. The Grand Mariner is known for its distinctive purple exterior, which included "barossa purple, beulah pink, tanunda pink, mariner pink, and blue mood" at the time of completion. It underwent a facelift in 2015, reducing the number of colours to four and making the building take on a lighter appearance. An economic recession in the 1990s led to a slowdown in high-risedevelopment for the rest of the decade, and up until the early 2000s.

=== 2000s–2010s ===
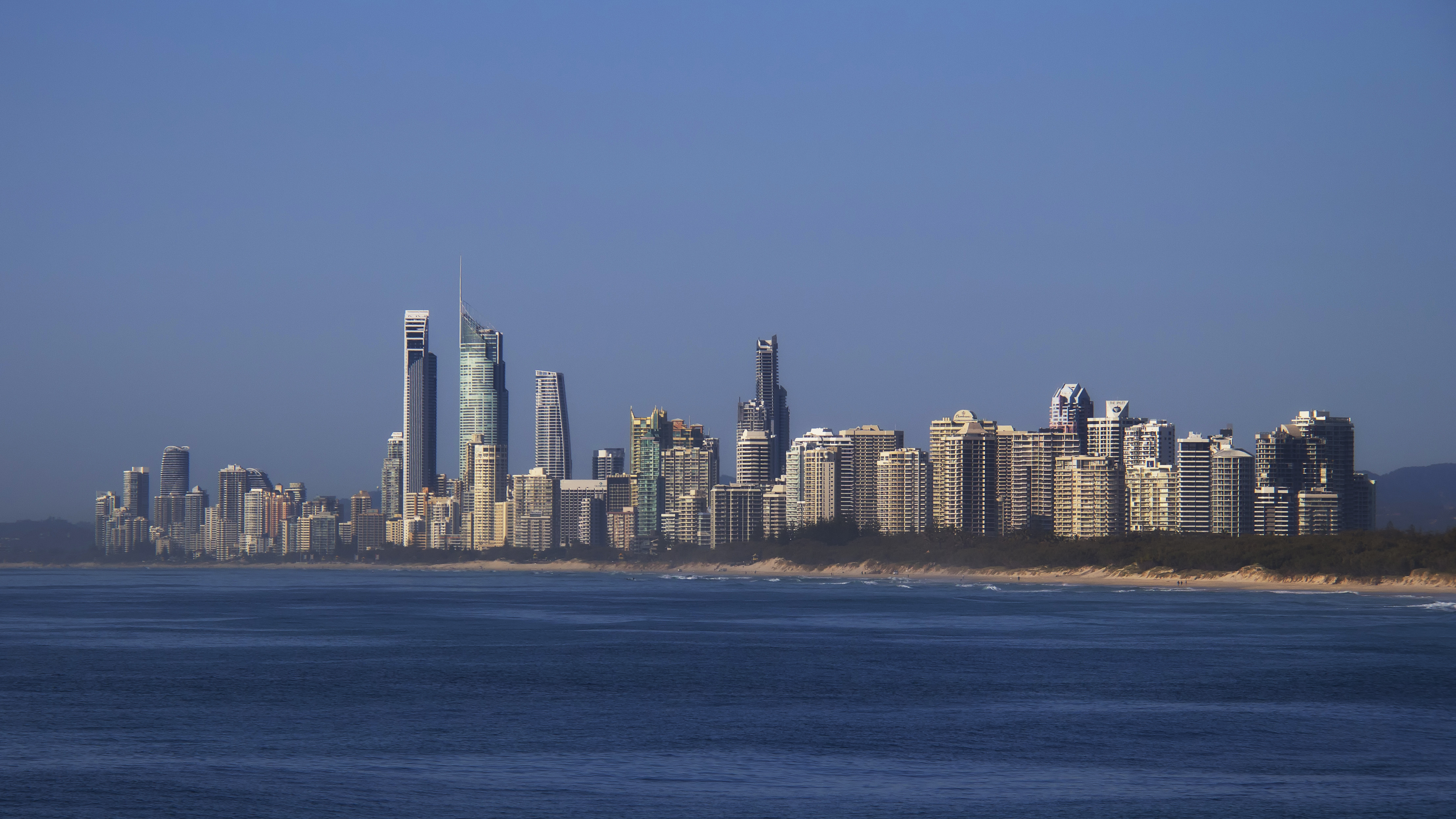
Gold Coast's skyline in 2012

By the mid-2000s, another real estate boom on the Gold Coast was taking shape. The city's tallest building, the supertall skyscraper Q1, was completed in 2005. It was the tallest building in the southern hemisphere as well as the tallest residential building in the world at the time, and remains the tallest in Australia today. Its form, with a slanted roof, was inspired by the Sydney Opera House as well as the Olympic torch in the 2000 Olympics that had taken place five years prior in Sydney. The skyscraper has an observation deck, known as SkyPoint (formerly QDeck), which allows views of the Gold Coast skyline, as well as Brisbane to the north.

High-rise development had also spread to the suburb of Southport, north of Surfers Paradise. The Southport Central residential complex was among the first buildings to exceed a height of 100 m (328 ft) in the suburb. The 55-storey Sundale Apartments, built by billionaire developer Harry Triguboff for $400 million, is now the tallest building in the area.

=== 2020s ===
The Gold Coast has continued to boom in the 2020s, owing to a healthy increase in population and economic growth. The 265 m (868 ft) tall mixed-use Ocean was completed in 2022, becoming the city's second tallest building. The suburb of Broadbeach, in particular, has been undergoing a residential high-rise development extending the Gold Coast's skyline southwards. The tallest building in the suburb, Epsilon, was built in 2025 at a height of 216 m (709 ft). It joins other skyscrapers completed in Broadbeach in the 2020s, such as The Dorsett and Star Residences, 272 Hedges Avenue, and Infinity Tower. A 212 m (696 ft) tower is further proposed on the site of a 16-storey hotel built in the 1980s. Burleigh Heads, to the south of Broadbeach, has also been receiving an influx of high-rises, with projects such as Norfolk and Natura.

While Q1 is currently the city's only supertall skyscraper, future developments could increase that number significantly. Under construction is the Cypress Palms complex, consisting of two 76-storey and 90-storey buildings. The latter will reach a height of 305 m (1,001 ft), becoming the city's second tallest skyscraper when complete. The project is being developed by Meriton, whose managing director, Harry Triguboff, has had a role in the development of over twenty high-rise buildings in the city. In 2025, renderings were released for a project of two slender skyscrapers in Southport. Named One Park Lane, the tallest of the towers, at 393 m (1,289 ft), would overtake Q1 as the tallest building on the Gold Coast and in Australia.

== Map of tallest buildings ==
This map shows the location of buildings taller than 100 m (394 ft) on the Gold Coast.

Buildings taller than 100 m (328 ft) on the Gold Coast.

=== By suburb ===
Surfer's Paradise
Buildings taller than 100 m (328 ft)
- 1970s
- 1980s
- 1990s
- 2000s
- 2010s
- 2020s
1 Q1
2 Ocean
3 Soul
4 Circle on Cavill North Tower
6 Hilton Surfers Hotel & Residences Orchid Tower
9 Jewel Hotel
11 Skyline North Tower
12 Circle on Cavill South Tower
14 Skyline Tower
15 Jewel North Tower
16 The Grand Mariner
17 Breakfree Peninsula
22 The Mantra Sun City
24 Rhapsody Surfers North
25 Skyline Central
29 Jewel Beach Tower
30 Hilton Surfers Hotel & Residences – Boulevard Tower
33 Fifty Cavill Avenue
35 Imperial Surf
36 Surfers Aquarius
37 Contessa Apartments
42 Atlantis Apartments East
43 Atlantis Apartments West
46 Marriott Hotel Resort
48 Avalon Riverfront Apartments
49 Courtyard Surfers Paradise Resort
51 Focus
54 Pearl
55 Axis Tower

Broadbeach
Buildings taller than 100 m (492 ft)
- 1990s
- 2000s
- 2010s
- 2020s
5 Epsilon
7 The Dorsett and Star Residences
10 The Oracle Beach Tower
13 272 Hedges Ave
18 The Oracle – Hinterland Tower
19 Infinity Tower
20 Air on Broadbeach
21 Qube Broadbeach
32 Signature Broadbeach
38 Luxe Broadbeach
39 Belle Maison
40 Avani Broadbeach Residences
41 The Wave
47 Carmel by the Sea
50 Remi Residences
56 Marella by Mosaic
57 Ultra Broadbeach

Southport
Buildings taller than 100 m (492 ft)
- 2000s
- 2010s
- 2020s
8 Sundale Apartments
23 Southport Central Tower B
26 Southport Central Tower A
27 Southport Central Tower C
28 Pivotal Point
31 Victoria Towers
44 Sky Broadwater
45 Shores
58 Marina Tower

Runaway Bay
Buildings taller than 100 m (492 ft)
- 1980s
- 1990s
52 Broadwater Tower
53 Bayview Towers

== Cityscape ==
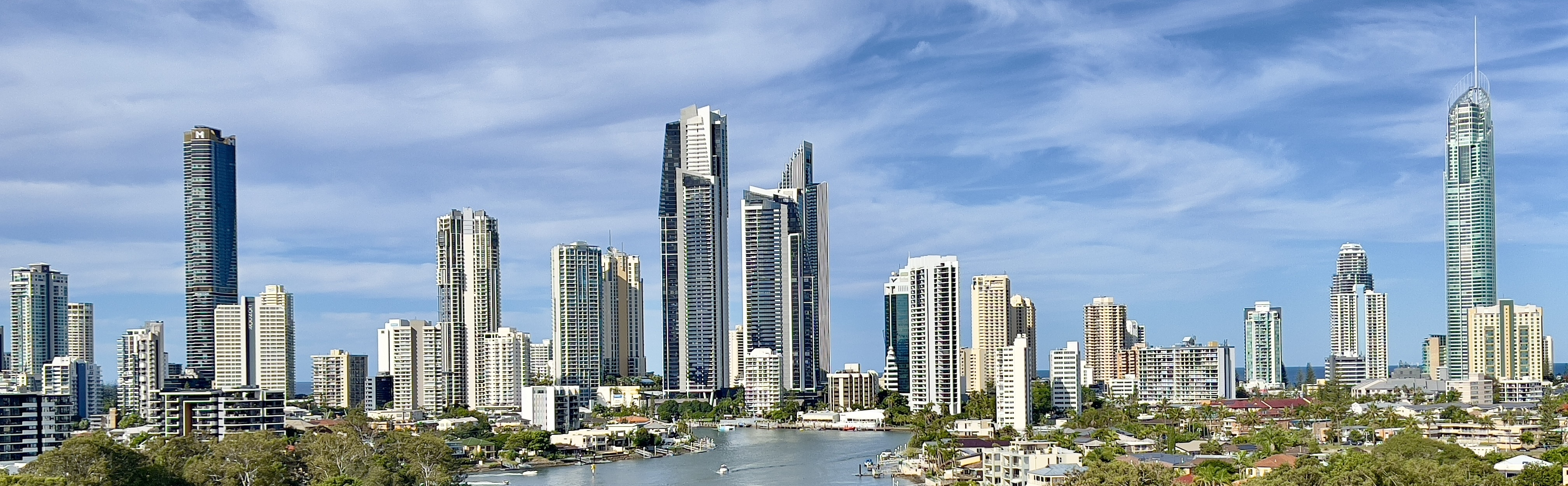
A portion of the Gold Coast's skyline, seen from Home of the Arts in 2023

== Tallest buildings ==
This list ranks completed skyscrapers on the Gold Coast that stand at least 100 m (328 ft) tall as of 2026, based on standard height measurement. This includes spires and architectural details but does not include antenna masts. The “Year” column indicates the year of completion. Buildings tied in height are sorted by year of completion with earlier buildings ranked first, and then alphabetically.

Was the tallest building on the Gold Coast upon completion

Rank	Name	Image	Location	Height m (ft)	Floors	Year	Purpose	Notes
1	Q1		28°00′23″S 153°25′47″E	322.5 (1,058)	78	2005	Residential	Tallest building in Australia since 2005. Tallest building completed on the Gold Coast in the 2000s.
2	Ocean		27°59′46″S 153°25′49″E	264.6 (868)	75	2022	Mixed-use	Residential and hotel skyscraper. Tallest building completed on the Gold Coast in the 2020s. Tallest mixed-use building on the Gold Coast.
3	Soul		28°00′05″S 153°25′50″E	243 (797)	77	2011	Residential	Tallest building completed on the Gold Coast in the 2010s.
4	Circle on Cavill North Tower		28°00′03″S 153°25′38″E	219.5 (720)	70	2007	Residential	
5	Epsilon	–	28°02′00″S 153°25′46″E	216.2 (709)	66	2025	Mixed-use	Residential and hotel skyscraper. Also known as Epsilon at The Star Residences. Tallest building in Broadbeach.
6	Hilton Surfers Hotel & Residences - Orchid Tower		28°00′04″S 153°25′45″E	187.9 (616)	57	2011	Residential	
7	The Dorsett and Star Residences	–	28°01′57″S 153°25′45″E	180 (591)	55	2022	Mixed-use	Residential and hotel skyscraper.
8	Sundale Apartments		27°58′28″S 153°25′10″E	179.6 (589)	55	2016	Residential	Tallest building in Southport.
9	Jewel Hotel		28°00′57″S 153°25′56″E	170 (558)	48	2018	Residential	Also known as Jewel Tower 2.
10	The Oracle - Beach Tower		28°01′50″S 153°25′59″E	165.2 (542)	50	2010	Residential	
11	Skyline North Tower		27°59′57″S 153°25′39″E	158 (518)	50	2004	Residential	Part of the Chevron Renaissance development. Tallest building on the Gold Coast briefly from 2004 to 2005.
12	Circle on Cavill South Tower		28°00′05″S 153°25′37″E	158 (518)	50	2006	Residential	
13	272 Hedges Ave	–	28°02′11″S 153°26′08″E	149 (489)	44	2022	Residential	
14	Skyline Tower		28°00′00″S 153°25′40″E	146.2 (480)	40	2006	Residential	Part of the Chevron Renaissance development.
15	Jewel North Tower		28°00′55″S 153°25′55″E	144 (472)	41	2018	Residential	Also known as Jewel Tower 1.
16	Grand Mariner Apartments		27°59′12″S 153°25′34″E	139 (456)	43	1992	Residential	Tallest building on the Gold Coast from 1992 to 2004. Tallest building completed on the Gold Coast in the 1990s.
17	Breakfree Peninsula		28°00′20″S 153°25′50″E	137 (449)	47	1982	Residential	Also known as Peninsula Resort. Tallest building on the Gold Coast from 1982 to 1992. Tallest building completed on the Gold Coast in the 1980s.
18	The Oracle – Hinterland Tower		28°01′50″S 153°25′55″E	134.4 (441)	40	2010	Residential	
19	Infinity Tower	–	28°02′00″S 153°25′57″E	133 (436)	41	2023	Residential	
20	Air on Broadbeach		28°01′46″S 153°26′02″E	131 (430)	37	2005	Residential	
21	Qube Broadbeach		28°01′38″S 153°25′49″E	131 (430)	42	2019	Residential	
22	The Mantra Sun City		27°59′34″S 153°25′43″E	130 (427)	42	1999	Residential	Also known simply as Sun City.
23	Southport Central Tower B		27°58′13″S 153°24′50″E	130 (427)	40	2007	Residential	
24	Rhapsody Surfers North	–	27°59′29″S 153°25′46″E	129 (423)	41	2016	Residential	
25	Skyline Central		27°59′59″S 153°25′38″E	127 (417)	4	2004	Residential	
26	Southport Central Tower A		27°58′11″S 153°24′51″E	127 (417)	40	2006	Residential	
27	Southport Central Tower C		27°58′14″S 153°24′47″E	126 (413)	40	2009	Residential	
28	Pivotal Point		27°58′01″S 153°24′57″E	124 (407)	40	2004	Residential	
29	Jewel Beach Tower		28°00′57″S 153°25′57″E	124 (407)	35	2019	Residential	Also known as Jewel Tower 3.
30	Hilton Surfers Hotel & Residences – Boulevard Tower		28°00′04″S 153°25′43″E	120 (394)	34	2010	Residential	
31	Victoria Towers	–	27°58′16″S 153°24′53″E	120 (394)	37	2010	Residential	Also known as Victoria Cross Towers.
32	Signature Broadbeach	–	28°01′55″S 153°25′58″E	120 (394)	35	2021	Residential	
33	Fifty Cavill Avenue	–	28°00′08″S 153°25′36″E	118 (387)	27	1991	Office	
34	The Inlet	–	27°58′55″S 153°25′35″E	117 (384)	27	1991	Residential	
35	Imperial Surf	–	27°59′48″S 153°25′49″E	116 (381)	40	1982	Residential	
36	Surfers Aquarius	–	28°00′50″S 153°25′56″E	114 (374)	39	1980	Residential	
37	Contessa Apartments	–	27°58′57″S 153°25′38″E	114 (374)	35	1989	Residential	
38	Luxe Broadbeach	–	28°01′49″S 153°26′02″E	112.2 (368)	33	2025	Residential	
39	Belle Maison	–	28°01′31″S 153°25′55″E	112 (367)	34	1992	Residential	
40	Avani Broadbeach Residences	–	28°01′57″S 153°25′52″E	112 (367)	37	2018	Residential	
41	The Wave	–	28°01′44″S 153°25′53″E	111 (364)	34	2006	Residential	
42	Atlantis Apartments East	–	27°59′18″S 153°25′35″E	110 (361)	37	1982	Residential	
43	Atlantis Apartments West	–	27°59′19″S 153°25′38″E	110 (361)	37	1984	Residential	
44	Sky Broadwater	–	27°57′39″S 153°24′41″E	109.4 (359)	36	2020	Mixed-use	
45	Shores	–	27°58′27″S 153°25′08″E	106 (348)	31	2005	Residential	
46	Marriott Hotel Resort	–	27°59′28″S 153°25′38″E	105 (344)	30	1992	Hotel	Also known as Surfers Paradise Marriott Resort.
47	Carmel by the Sea	–	28°01′58″S 153°26′03″E	105 (344)	33	1996	Residential	
48	Avalon Riverfront Apartments	–	28°00′08″S 153°25′33″E	105 (344)	35	2006	Residential	
49	Courtyard Surfers Paradise Resort	–	28°00′10″S 153°25′45″E	104 (341)	36	1984	Hotel	
50	Remi Residences	–	28°01′34″S 153°25′52″E	103.4 (339)	31	2024	Residential	
51	Focus	–	27°59′42″S 153°25′48″E	103 (338)	34	1976	Residential	Tallest building on the Gold Coast from 1976 to 1982.
52	Broadwater Tower	–	27°55′28″S 153°24′19″E	103 (338)	35	1984	Residential	Joint-tallest building in Biggera Waters.
53	Bayview Towers	–	27°55′26″S 153°24′15″E	103 (338)	31	1990	Residential	Joint-tallest building in Biggera Waters.
54	Pearl	–	27°58′51″S 153°25′43″E	102 (335)	31	2024	Residential	Also known as Pearl Main Beach.
55	Axis Tower	–	27°58′55″S 153°25′32″E	101 (331)	31	2005	Residential	
56	Marella by Mosaic	–	28°01′22″S 153°25′50″E	100.7 (330)	29	2025	Residential	
57	Ultra Broadbeach	–	28°02′01″S 153°25′58″E	100 (328)	32	2006	Residential	Serviced apartments.
58	Marina Tower	–	27°58′31″S 153°25′10″E	100 (328)	30	2007	Residential	

== Tallest under construction or approved ==
=== Under construction ===
The following table ranks skyscrapers that are under construction on the Gold Coast that are expected to be at least 100 m (328 ft) tall as of 2026, based on standard height measurement. The “Year” column indicates the expected year of completion. Buildings that are on hold are not included.

Name	Height m (ft)	Floors	Purpose	Year	Notes
Cypress Palms - Tower 1	305.2 (1,001)	90	Residential	2027	
Iconica - North Tower	264.7 (868)	80	Residential	2026	
Cypress Palms - Tower 2	261.6 (858)	76	Residential	2027	
Victoria and Albert Residences - The Victoria	218 (715)	64	Residential	2026	
Iconica - South Tower	180.5 (592)	53	Residential	2026	
The Rochester	150.8 (495)	43	Residential	2026	
Midwater	148 (486)	39	Residential	2026	
Victoria and Albert Residences - The Albert	143.5 (471)	40	Residential	2026	
Coast (43-49 Garfield)	139.1 (456)	40	Residential	–	
Royale Gold Coast	136 (446)	40	Residential	2026	
Chevron One	134.2 (440)	41	Residential	2026	
Affinity	130.9 (429)	40	Residential	2028	
Crest - Crest Tower	125.9 (413)	40	Residential	2027	
Peerless	124 (407)	36	Residential	–	
Madeline	118.4 (388)	38	Residential	–	
Amaya	112.2 (368)	34	Residential	2026	
Lagoon (Tower 2)	100 (328)	31	Residential	2026	
Marine Quarter - Tower 2	111.5 (366)	35	Residential	–	
Crest - Calypso Tower	111.2 (365)	35	Residential	–	
Lily	107.8 (354)	33	Residential	–	
Drift Residences	107.8 (354)	32	Residential	–	
The Landmark - Tower 2	101.2 (332)	30	Residential	–	

=== Approved ===
The following table ranks approved skyscrapers on the Gold coast that are expected to be at least 150 m (394 ft) tall as of 2026, based on standard height measurement. The “Year” column indicates the expected year of completion. A dash “–“ indicates information about the building's height or year of completion is not available.

Name	Height m (ft)	Floors	Purpose	Year	Status	Notes
One Park Lane - Tower 1	393 (1,289)	101	Residential	2027	Approved	
The Majesty - Tower 1	358 (1,175)	108	Residential	2027	Approved	
One Park Lane - Tower 2	228 (748)	60	Office	2027	Approved	
Imperial - Tower 2	216 (709)	68	Residential	2028	Approved	
The Landmark - Tower 4	176 (577)	53	Residential	2027	Approved	
Assana	176 (577)	52	Residential	2027	Approved	
MRCB International	173 (568)	51	Residential	2027	Approved	
Paradiso Place - Tower 3	157 (515)	42	Residential	2027	Approved	

== Timeline of tallest buildings ==
This lists buildings that once held the title of tallest building on the Gold Coast.

Name	Image	Years as tallest	Height	Floors
Focus	–	1976–1982 (6 years)	103 m	34
Breakfree Peninsula		1982–1992 (10 years)	137 m	47
The Grand Mariner		1992–2004 (12 years)	139 m	43
Skyline North Tower		2004–2005 (1 year)	158 m	50
Q1		2005–present	323 m	78

== See also ==
- List of tallest buildings in Australia
- List of tallest buildings in Oceania
