= Jewel (building) =

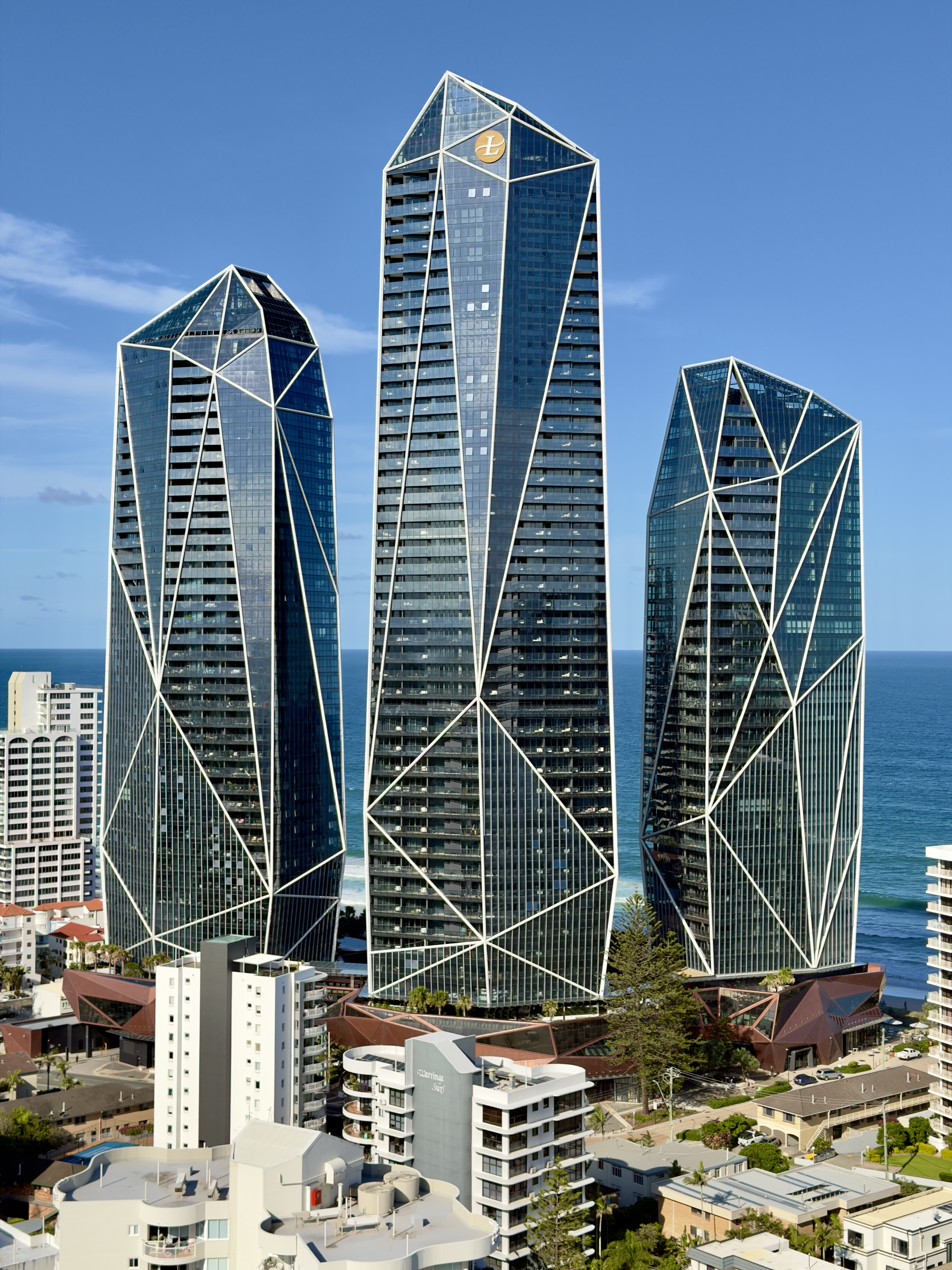
Jewel Towers, 2026

The Jewel Private Residences, also known as Jewel, are a group of three residential towers in the suburb of Surfers Paradise in the city of Gold Coast in Queensland, Australia. Construction began in March 2015, and the buildings were completed in July 2020. They stand at 41, 47 and 34 storeys high, and are positioned on the beachfront. The project was the most expensive high-rise development in Queensland's history. It is owned by AW Holding Group.

The towers’ designs are inspired by quartz crystals. The unique, triptych design was carried out by Oppenheim Architecture and was constructed by Multiplex. The interior was designed by DBI Design.

The site occupies 110 metres of beachfront and covers 1.1 hectares. The complex houses a five star hotel, called The Langham, consisting of 169 suites in the middle tower. The rest of the complex contains 512 one, two, and three bedroom apartments. A podium stretching across all three building's bases provides for conference facilities as well as food and beverage outlets and retail and resort amenities. Three levels of basement provide parking to 812 cars.

The building utilises sophisticated facade technologies that provide shading from sun and shelter from the wind. It has been designed to achieve a five star green star rating.

Three years after construction finished many apartments remain unsold and are not on the market. The delayed, staggered release of residential apartments has been criticised as inappropriate during a housing crisis.

== See also ==
- List of tallest buildings on the Gold Coast
