= Sundale Apartments =

55-storey tower in Southport, Australia

Meriton Suites Southport
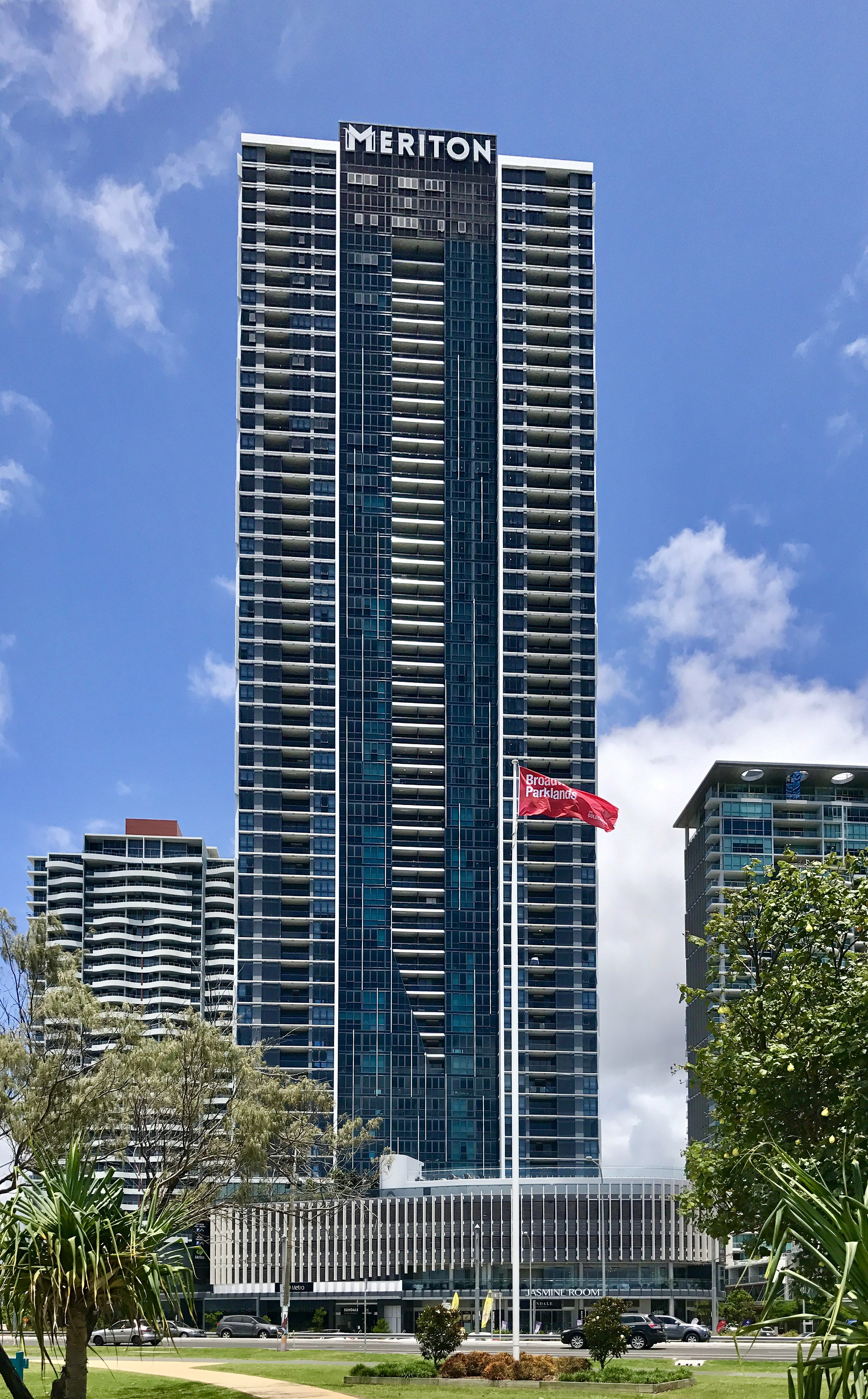
- Interactive map of the Meriton Suites Southport area

General information
- Status: Completed
- Type: Apartments
- Architectural style: Modernist
- Location: Southport, Queensland, Australia
- Coordinates: 27.9742°S 153.4196°E
- Opening: 2017
- Cost: $400 million

Height
- Roof: 177 m (581 ft)

Technical details
- Floor count: 55

Design and construction
- Architect: DBI Design
- Developer: Meriton

References
- Meriton Suites

Sundale Apartments is a 55-storey tower in Southport, Australia, occupied by Meriton Suites and privately owned apartments. The building is one of the tallest on the Gold Coast and is the tallest in the Southport area. It is located in the Meriton Retail Precinct Sundale Southport and trades as Meriton Suites Southport.

It was built by the billionaire developer Harry Triguboff for $400 million, with the first units going to market in 2014.
