= Soul (building) =

Residential tower in Queensland, Australia

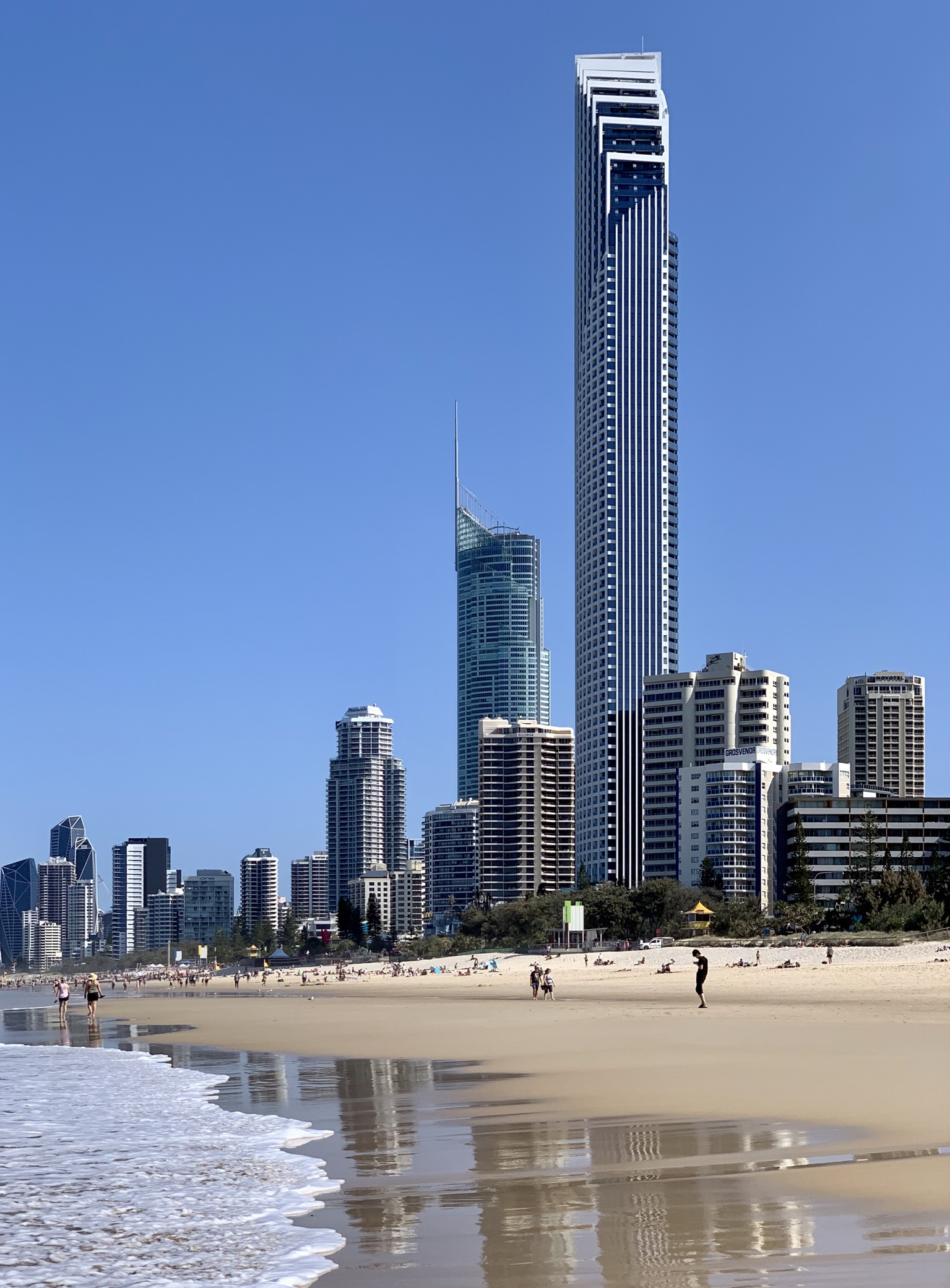

- Location within Queensland

General information
- Status: Completed
- Type: Residential
- Location: Gold Coast, Australia
- Coordinates: 28°00′4.2″S 153°25′49.77″E
- Completed: 2012

Height
- Roof: 243 m (797 ft)

Technical details
- Floor count: 77

Design and construction
- Developer: Juniper
- Main contractor: Grocon

Soul is a 243 m (797 ft) tall residential tower and hotel on the Esplanade, close to Cavill Avenue in Surfers Paradise on the Gold Coast, Queensland, Australia. it is the 3rd tallest building on the Gold Coast behind Ocean which topped out in late 2021 but above Circle at Cavil. The Gold Coast City Council approved the building in October 2004 and finished construction in 2012, along with the next stage of the Gold Coast renovation project.

It was developed by Juniper Group, and constructed by Grocon at a cost of A$850 million.

== History ==
The Raptis Plaza previously occupied the site which was a shopping centre. By early April 2010 construction of the core structure had reached level 40. By July 2010 the tower had reached 138 m (453 ft) half the structure's total height. On the 14 March 2011, workers left the site in protest at the sacking of 11 Australian tilers while Korean workers were allowed to stay. Owners of units from level 39 and below were able to move into their properties before the building was complete. Some shops had opened in the retail section in mid 2010.

=== Design ===
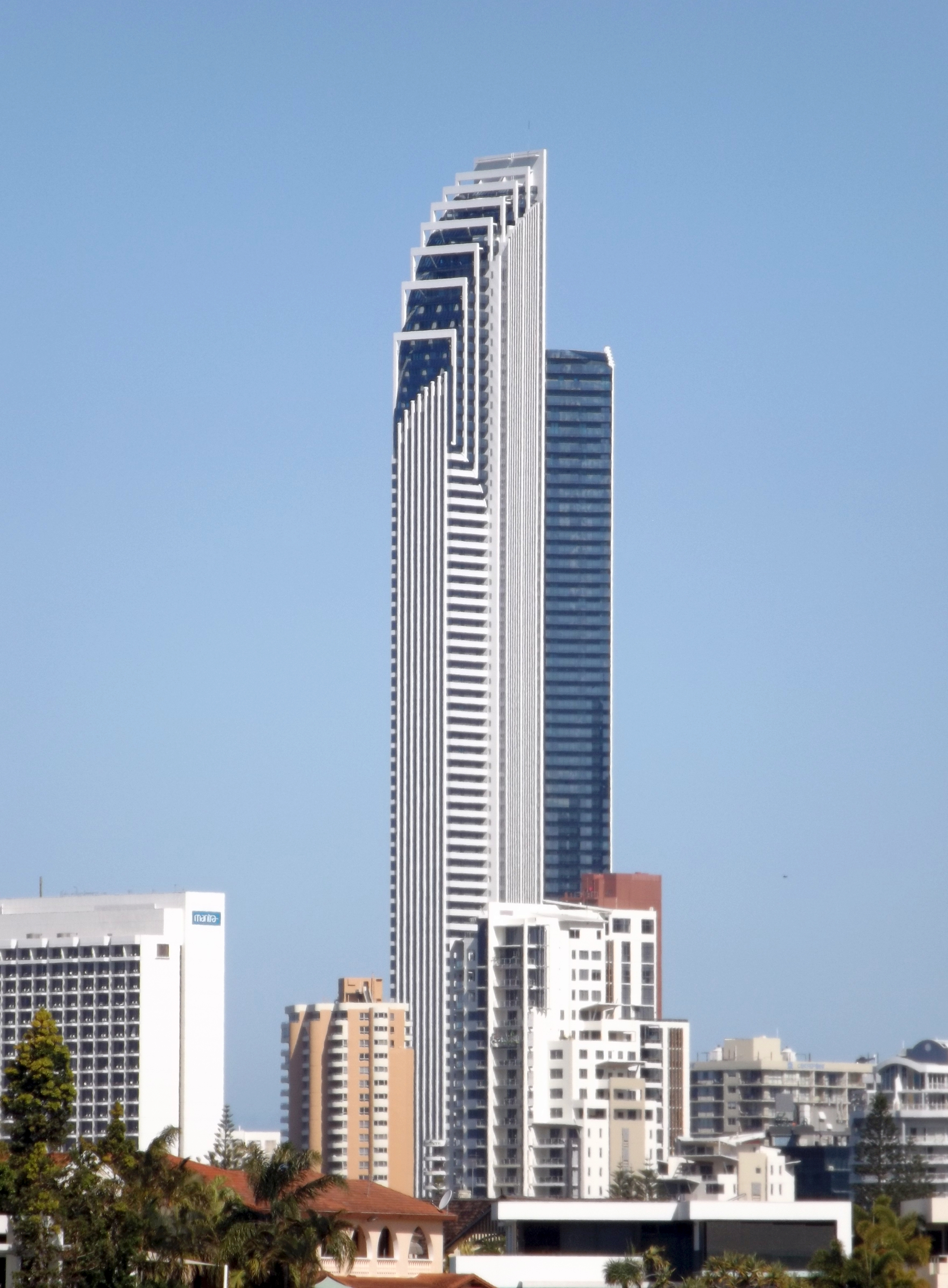
View from north east, 2015

The tower was designed by the local architectural company DBI Design PL.The design includes 288 units on 77 floors and 5,700 m² of retail space. An average square metre cost of A$16,490, made Soul the highest priced units on the Gold Coast at the time.

== Units ==
Soul's penthouse, which spans four levels, was Australia's highest-selling apartment at A$16.75 million. Beneath the penthouse are three sub-penthouses each occupying a whole floor. Sales were strong between 2006 and 2008, however the 2008 financial crisis curtailed purchases. All units in the building were sold for more than $1 million each.

Buyers from China were specifically targeted after strong sales from Chinese visitors were recorded early in 2010. Overall most purchases were made from people living in the South East Queensland region. In early 2009 sales of units in Soul had slowed with just over 100 units still for sale. By July 2010, three-quarters of the units had been sold.

== Receivership ==
The development was placed into receivership in October 2012. At the time at least 88 units in the building remained unsold. Earlier, Grocon had started legal proceedings against Juniper Group over alleged outstanding payments for construction.

== Management ==
From November 2013, Mantra Group took over the management rights of Soul from the receivers & manager, PwC. It is now known as Peppers Soul, part of the Accor Group.

== See also ==
- List of tallest buildings on the Gold Coast, Queensland
- List of tallest buildings in Australia
