= Grand Mariner Apartments =

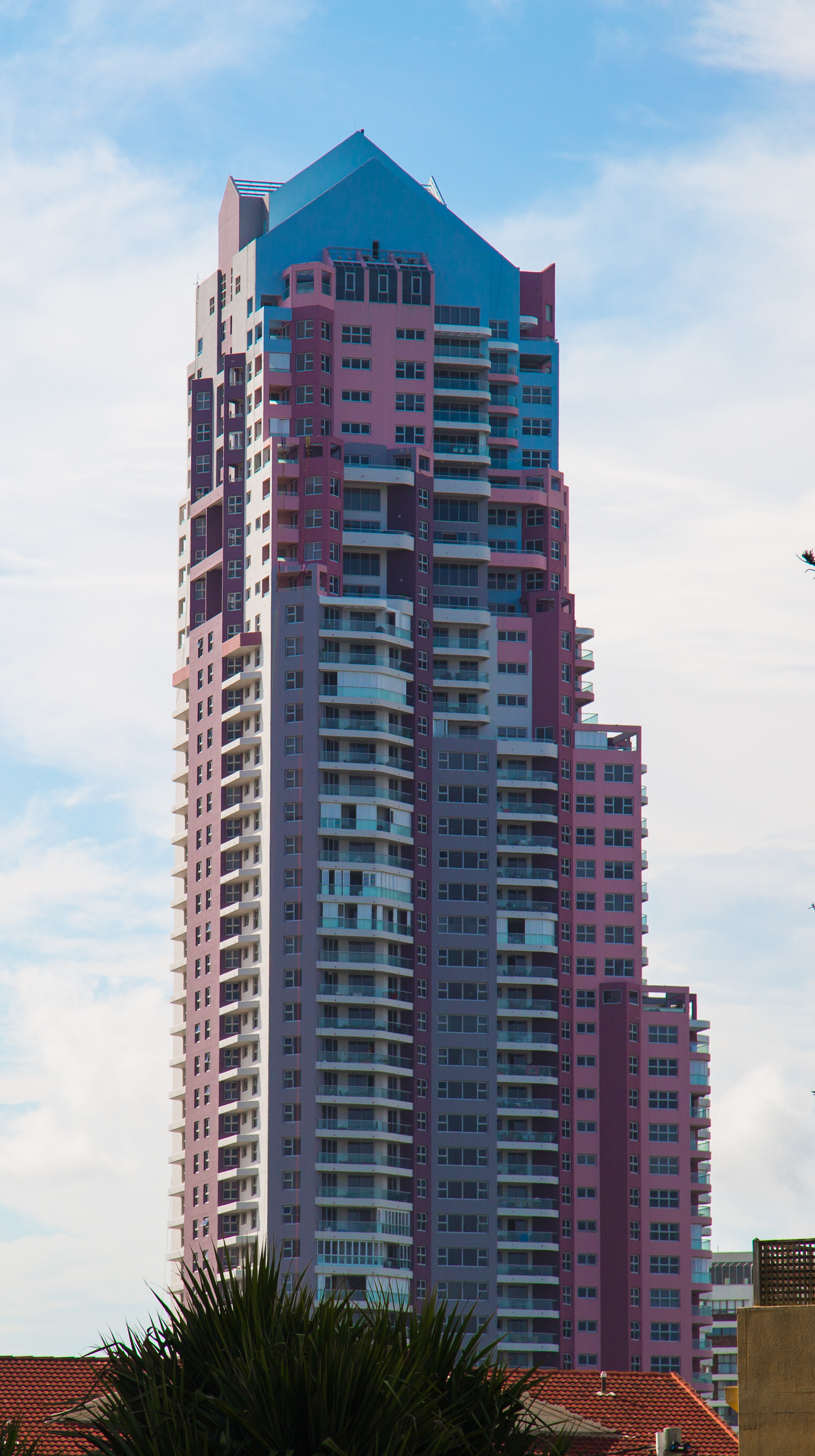
- Grand Mariner Apartments, in 2015
- Interactive map of the Grand Mariner Apartments area
- Alternative names: The Grand Mariner

General information
- Type: Residential
- Location: Gold Coast, Queensland, Australia
- Coordinates: 27.9866°S 153.4261°E

Height
- Height: 139 metres

The Grand Mariner Apartments is a residential skyscraper on the Gold Coast, Australia. Designed by Hulbert Group, the tower stands at a height of 139 metres.

== History ==
Construction of the building, designed by the Canadian architecture firm Hulbert Group and carried out by an international joint venture between Orient Corporation and Mitsui Construction, was completed in 1992 after the bankruptcy of an initial contractor. At the time of its completion, the building was the tallest in the city.

In 2015, the building underwent a renovation that reduced the number of its façade colours from seven to four, giving it a lighter appearance.

== Description ==
The building is located on Macintosh Island, a short distance from the seafront in the suburb of Main Beach on the Gold Coast. It stands 139 meters tall, has 43 floors, and contains 194 apartments. It is distinguished by its postmodern style and the multicoloured façades, inspired by sunset hues with shades of purple, pink, light blue, and blue, later simplified into a lighter colour palette.
