= Ocean (building) =

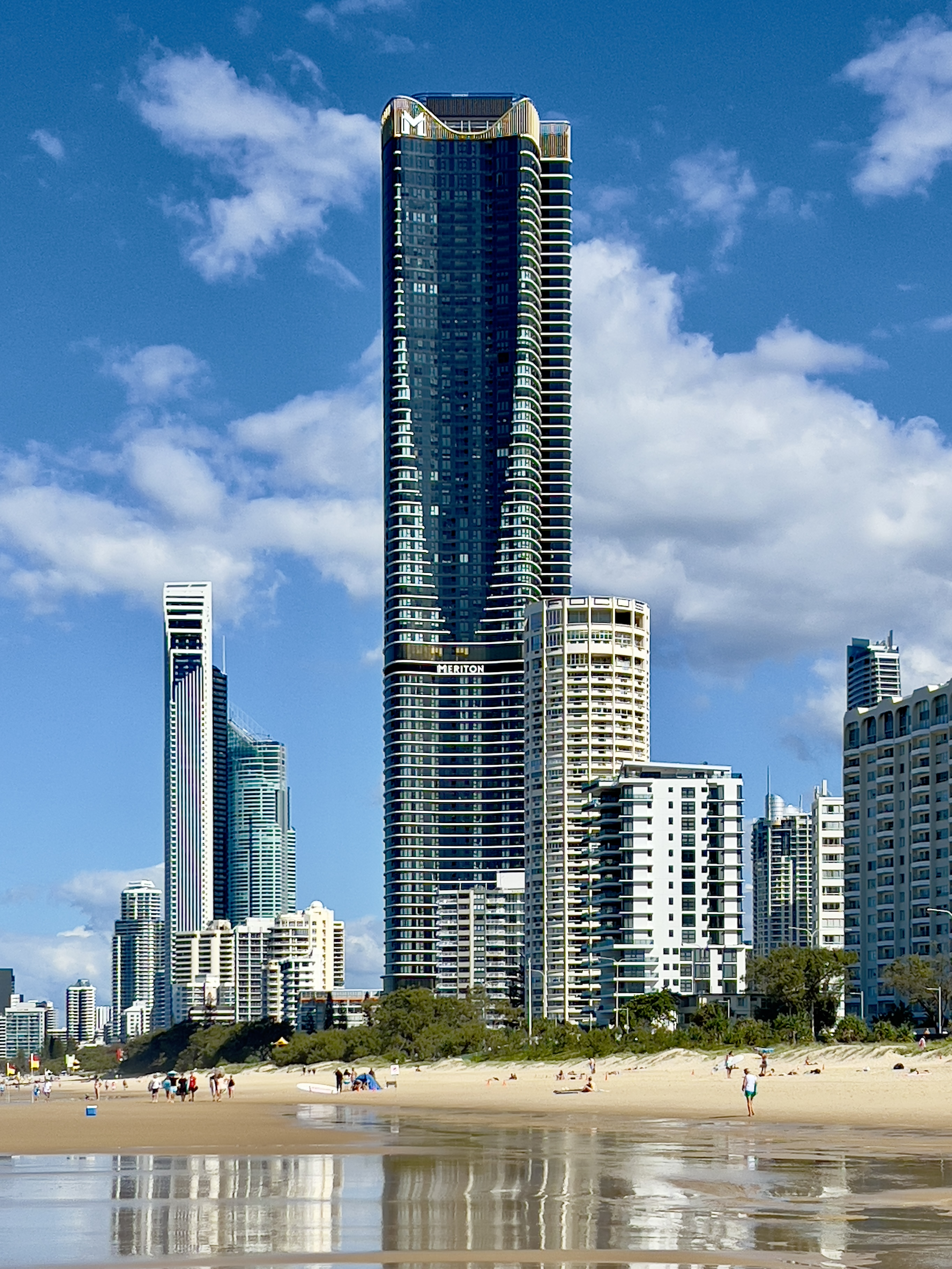
- Building in 2023

General information
- Status: Completed
- Type: Residential
- Location: Gold Coast, Queensland, Australia, 84 The Esplanade, Surfers Paradise
- Coordinates: 27.9961°S 153.4297°E
- Completed: 2022
- Owner: Meriton

Height
- Height: 264.6 metres (868 ft)
- Top floor: 75

Technical details
- Floor count: 75 plus 3 basements

Design and construction
- Architecture firm: SJB Architects
- Developer: Karimbla Constructions Services
- Structural engineer: ABC Consultants

Website
- Meriton Group

Ocean is a residential skyscraper located at 84 The Esplanade, Surfers Paradise, Gold Coast, Australia.

The 75-storey tower includes 722 apartments, is the largest on the Gold Coast. Facilities include a recreation area with swimming pool, spa, fitness courtyard, and barbecue area, located on the top level of a five-level podium. A residents’ indoor pool will be included on level 32. The three level basement will accommodate 392 parking spaces. At a height of 265 metres (856 ft), it is the second tallest building on the Gold Coast, after Q1. The building features five top-floor penthouses.

A development application was lodged with the Gold Coast City Council in December 2017.

An objection against the development was lodged in January 2018. Construction subsequently began in mid 2018, before topping out in late 2021.

== Construction ==
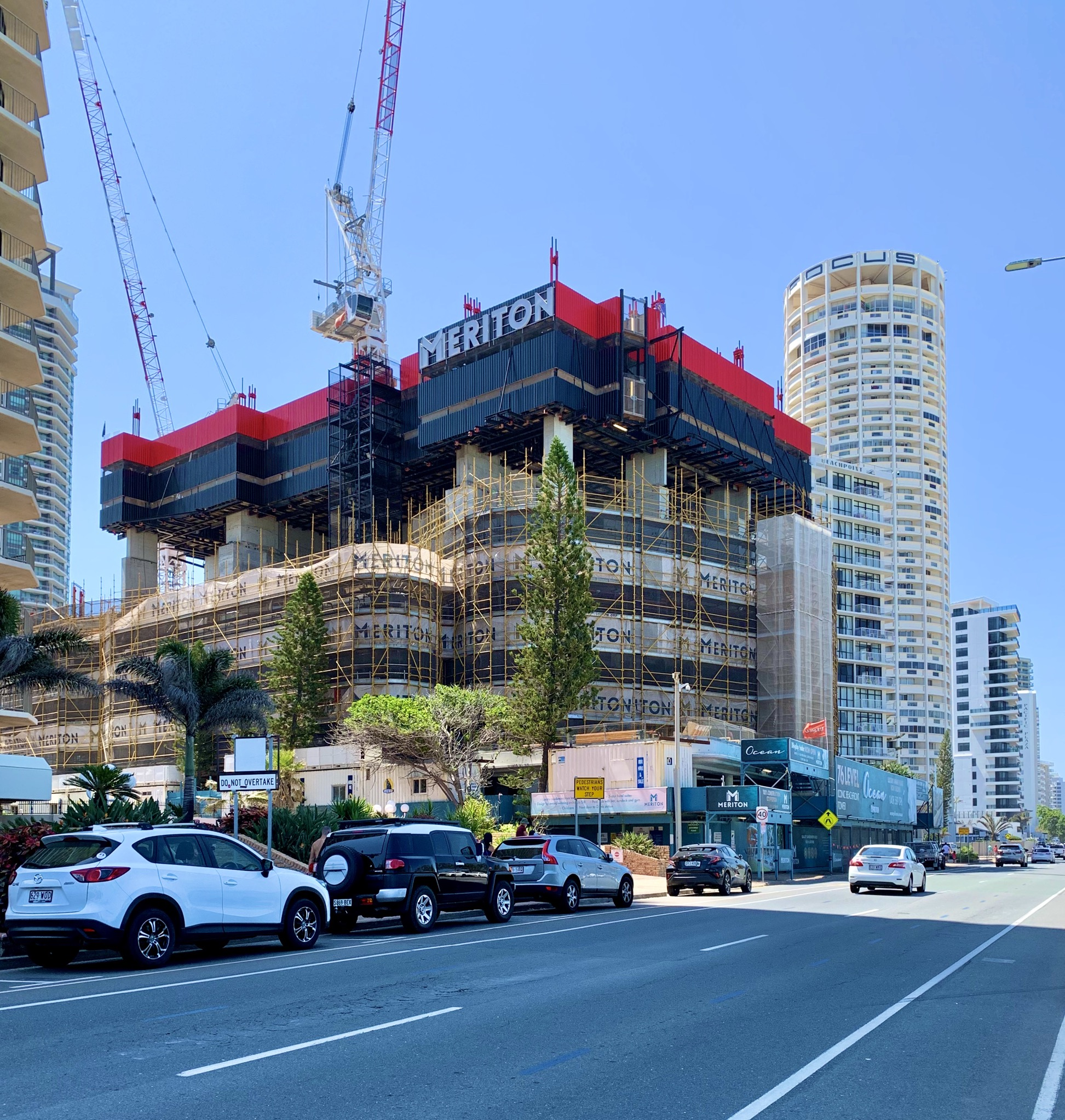
January 2020

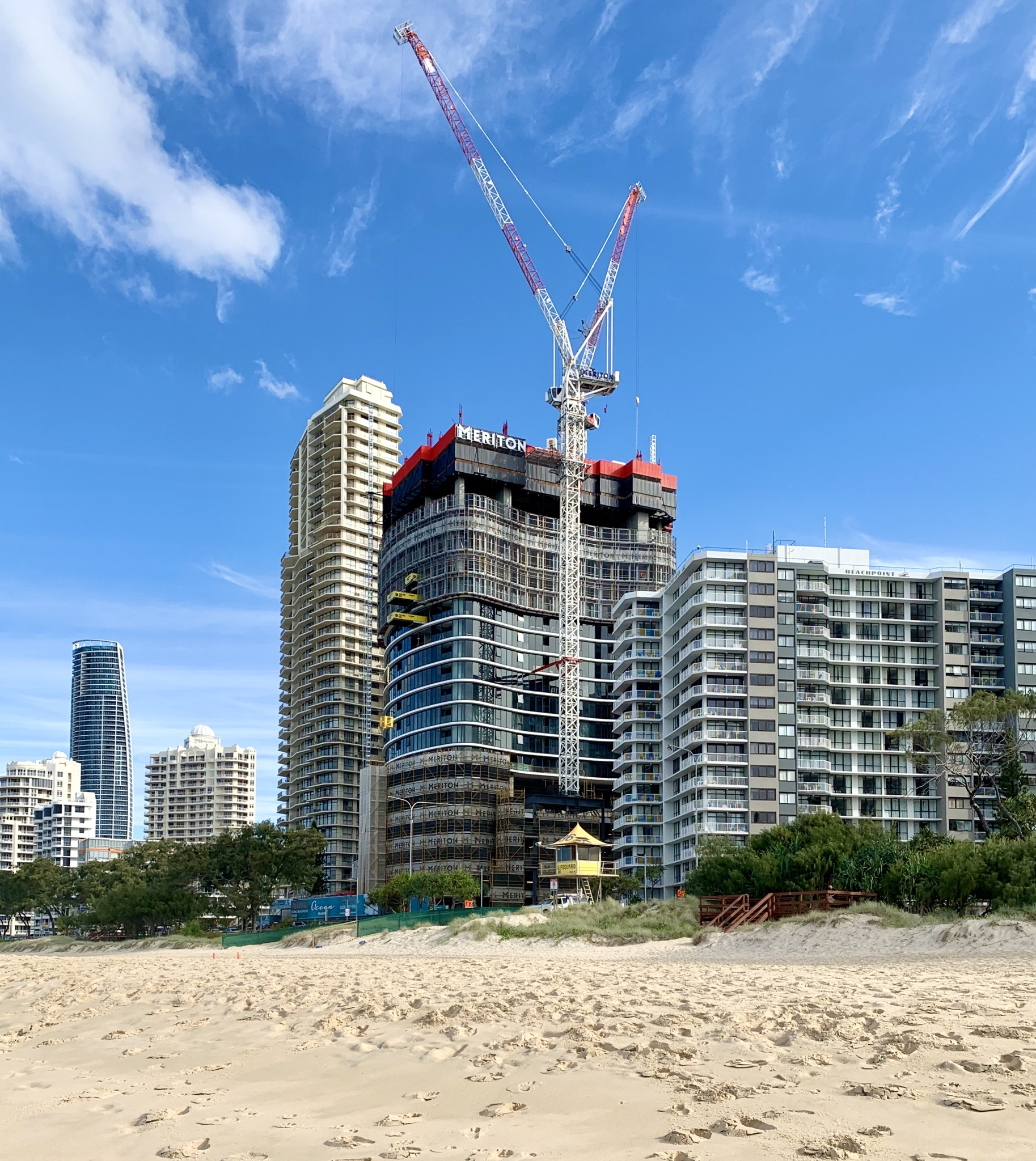
June 2020

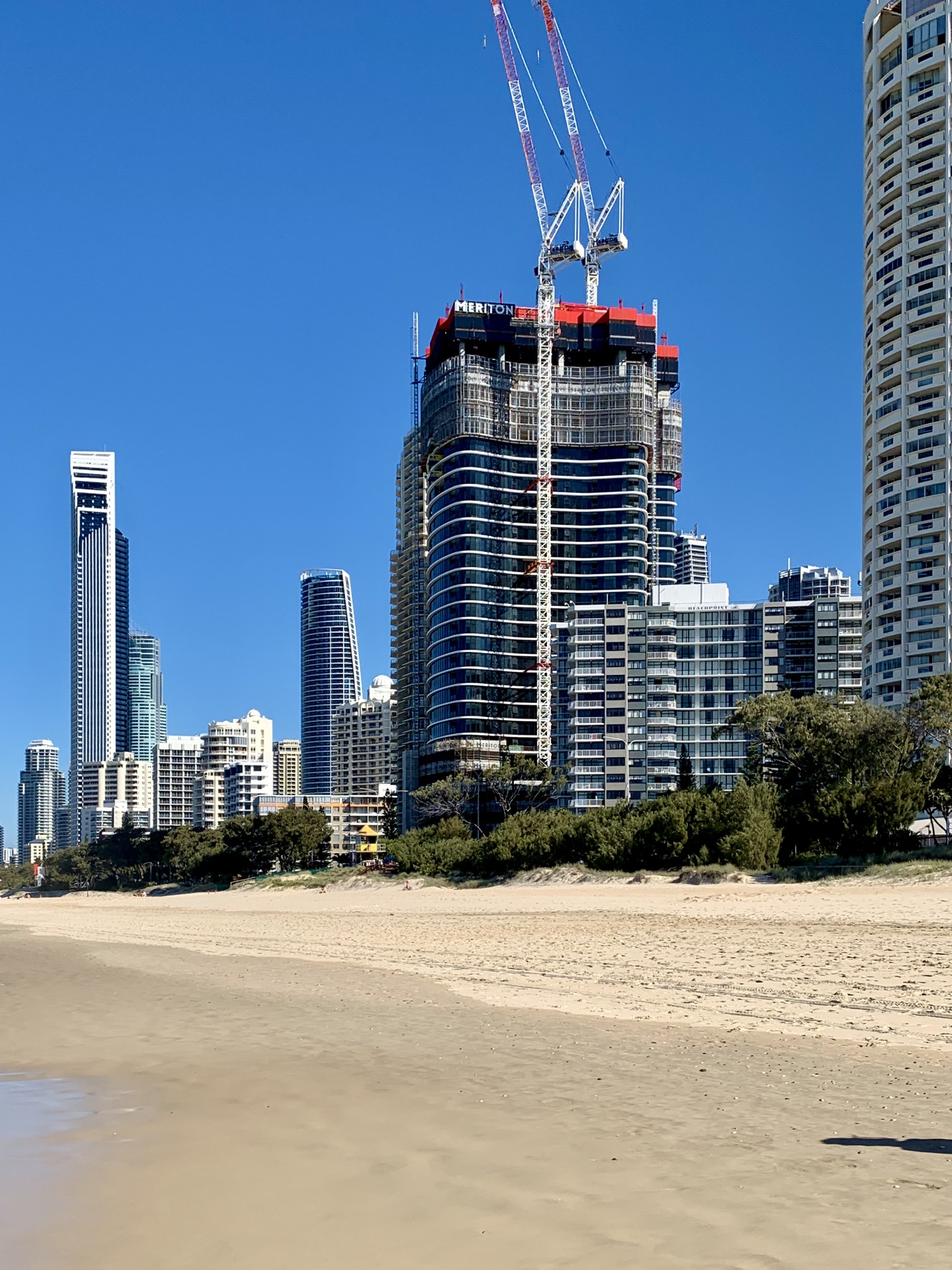
August 2020

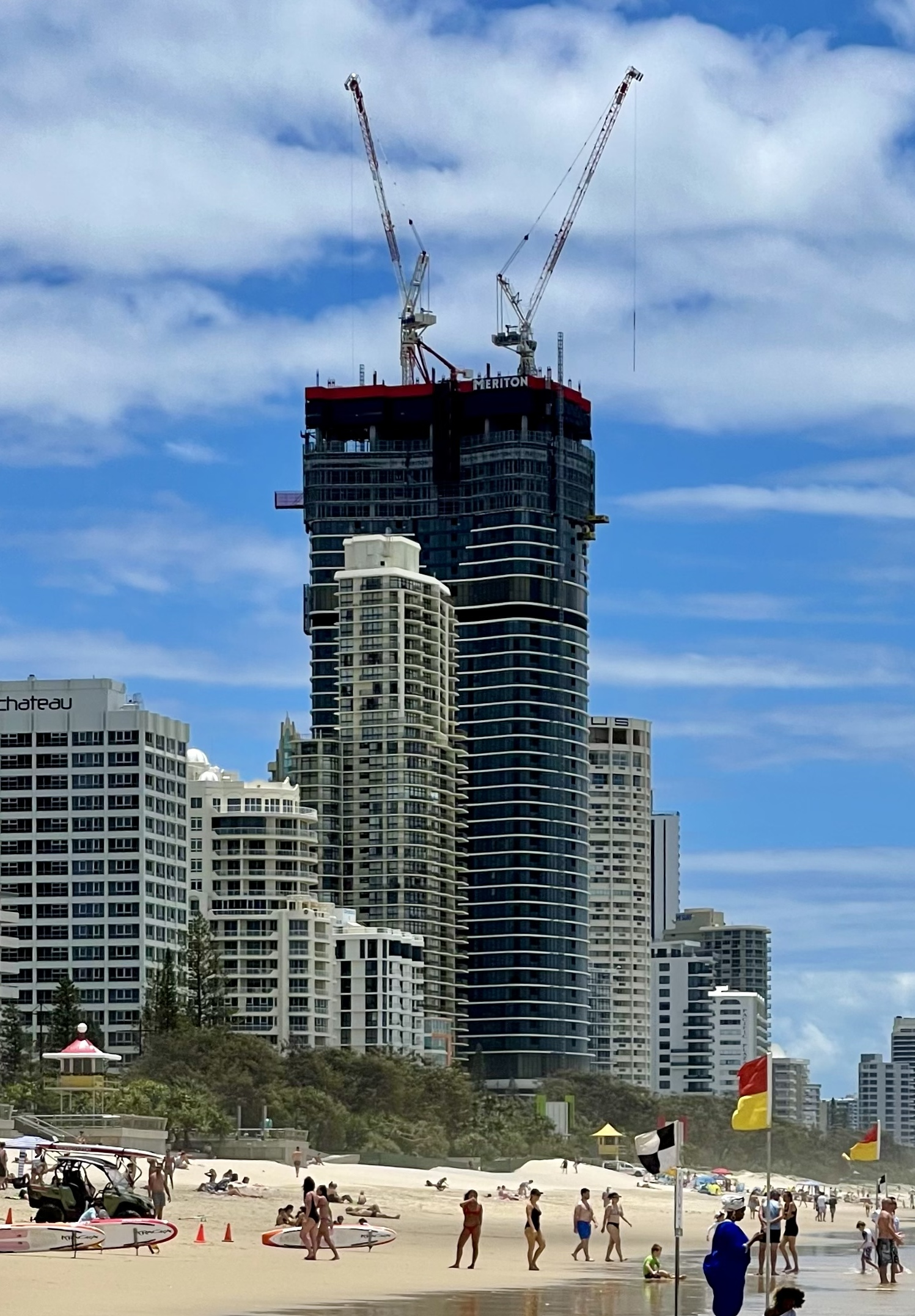
January 2021

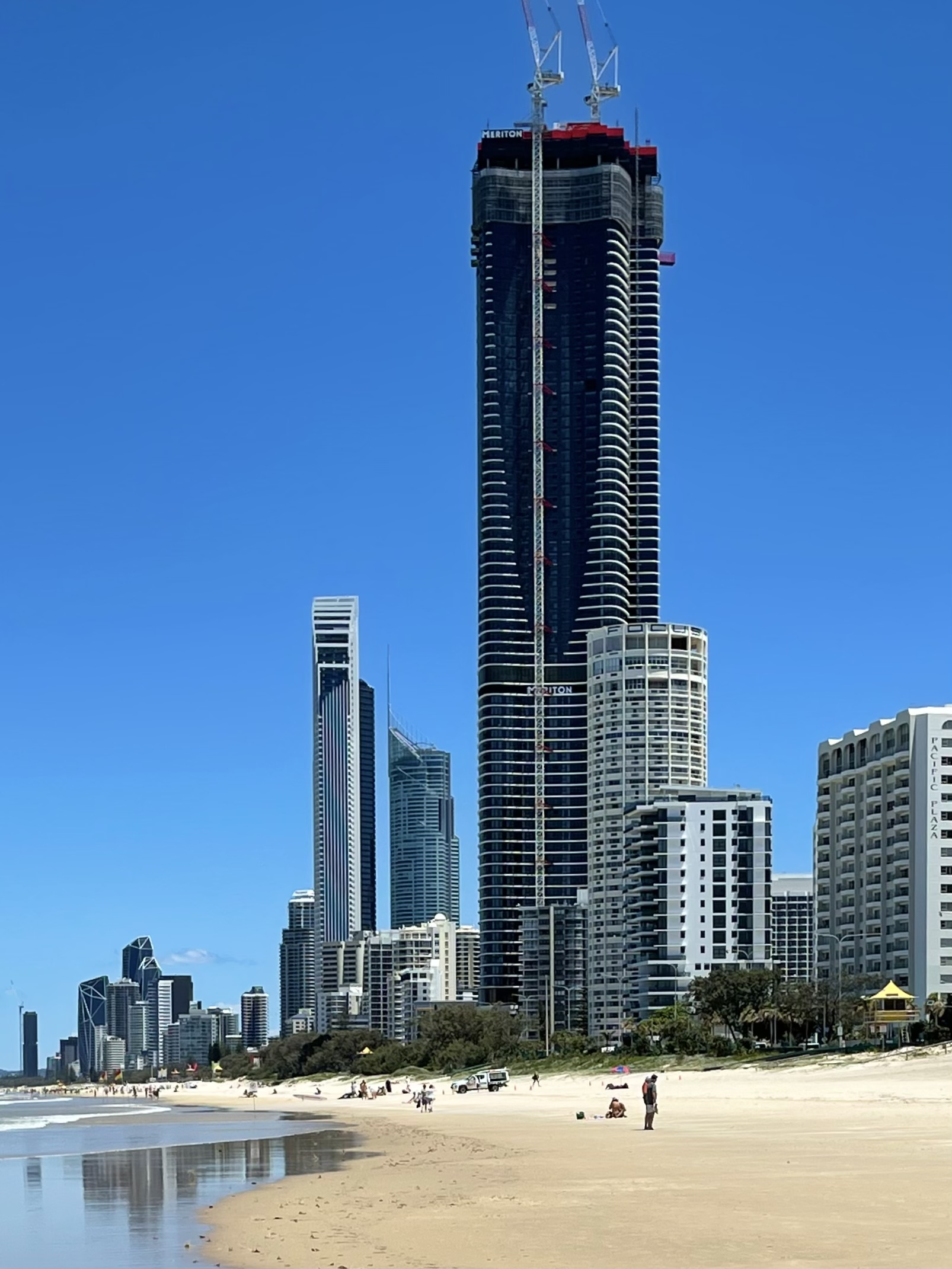
November 2021

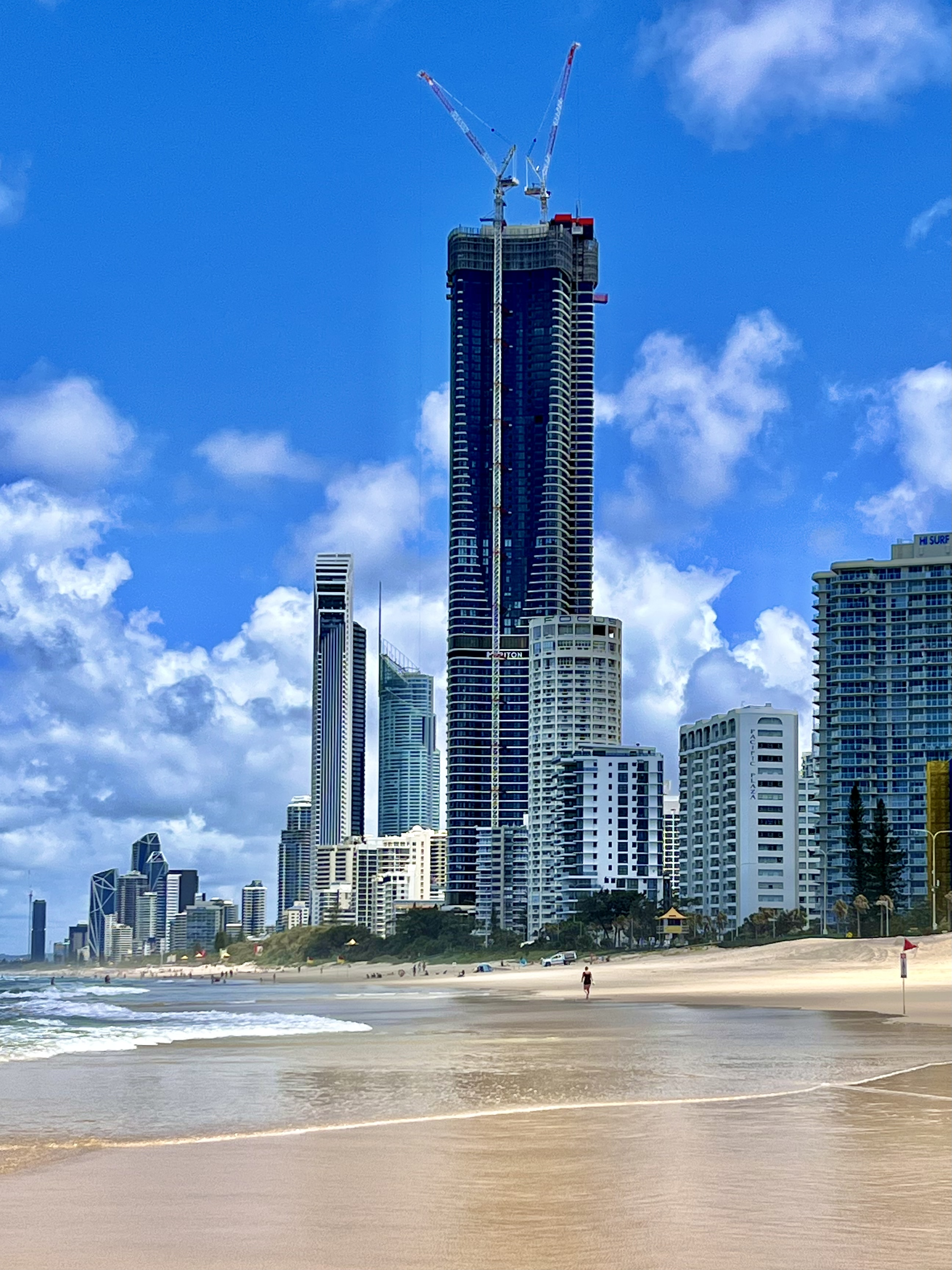
January 2022

== See also ==
- List of tallest buildings on the Gold Coast
