= Circle on Cavill =

Commercial development in Gold Coast, Australia

- (South & North Towers)
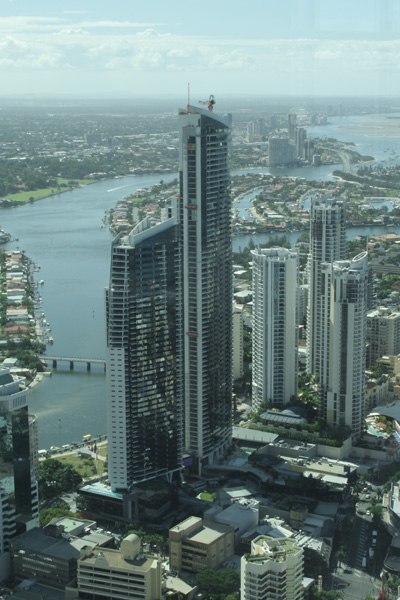
- Circle on Cavill from the Q1 observation deck.
- Interactive map of the Circle on Cavill area

General information
- Type: Residential
- Location: Gold Coast, Australia
- Coordinates: 28.001109°S 153.42706°E
- Completed: Feb 2007 (South); July 2007 (North)

Height
- Roof: 158 m (518 ft) (South); 220 m (720 ft) (North)

Technical details
- Floor count: 48 (South); 68 (North)

Design and construction
- Developer: Sunland
- Main contractor: Sunland

Circle on Cavill is a $551 million commercial development with two residential towers built by the Sunland Group and positioned in a key city block in the heart of the Surfers Paradise CBD, neighbouring with Towers of Chevron Renaissance shopping mall and resort apartment complex. Circle on Cavill is bounded by the main Surfers Paradise Boulevard at the western end of Cavill Mall and river end of Cavill Avenue, between the Gold Coast Highway and Ferny Avenue, in Surfers Paradise on the Gold Coast, Queensland, Australia.

The street address for the Circle on Cavill residential apartments is 9 Ferny Avenue, Surfers Paradise. The South Tower was completed around March 2007 and the North Tower was completed around July 2007. Both towers are joined on level 4 lounge which takes in the view of the Nerang River. The tallest point of the north tower is approximately 220 m and reflects a recent trend to building upwards in Surfers' skyline, also reflected in the construction of Q1 and Soul.

== Features ==
Circle on Cavill retail precinct on ground level features 4 main retail areas including an open air piazza designed for picnics, public gatherings, art, entertainment and sporting events on a large LED screen with alfresco cafes, restaurants and bars, coupled with boutique shopping – specialty stores and a supermarket with a diverse range of essential services such as Woolworths and ATM facilities.

Circle on Cavill Shopping Centre underwent a major refurbishment in 2012 and secured a major anchor tenant in Woolworths Circle on Cavill. Other notable businesses in the retail precinct include Billabong and Domino's Pizza.

== Apartments ==
Circle on Cavill is a mix of 1, 2 and 3 bedroom apartments across two residential towers. Circle on Cavill spans a 1.4 hectare site and comprises two towers - South Tower (48 levels, 279 units) and North Tower (68 levels, 365 units), totalling 644 apartments.

== Facilities ==
Resort facilities include a residents club lounge on level 4 for all guests, three resort pools including a lagoon pool with water features (North Tower), a 25m heated indoor swimming pool (North Tower) and a 25 m. lap pool and 10-seater spa on sun terrace (South Tower). There is a gymnasium, in-house cinema (seating for 12 people), sauna & steam rooms, change rooms, barbecue & entertaining areas, a children's play area, a big screen TV and games room.

== History ==
Around 1920, Brisbane hotelier James (Jim) Cavill acquired twenty-five acres (10 hectares) of land in an area known as Elston – the place known now as Surfers Paradise. The name James Cavill has always been connected with Surfers Paradise. Dated back to 1923, Cavill paid £40 for a block of land. In 1925 he built the Surfers Paradise Hotel and is the namesake for Cavill Mall and Cavill Avenue. Then the bridge across the Nerang River was built, improving access to the hotel that, at the time, had a small zoo and a beer garden. During World War II, the hotel was used by convalescing soldiers, some of whom later returned with their wives and families.

== See also ==
- List of tallest buildings in Australia
