= Iconica Residences =

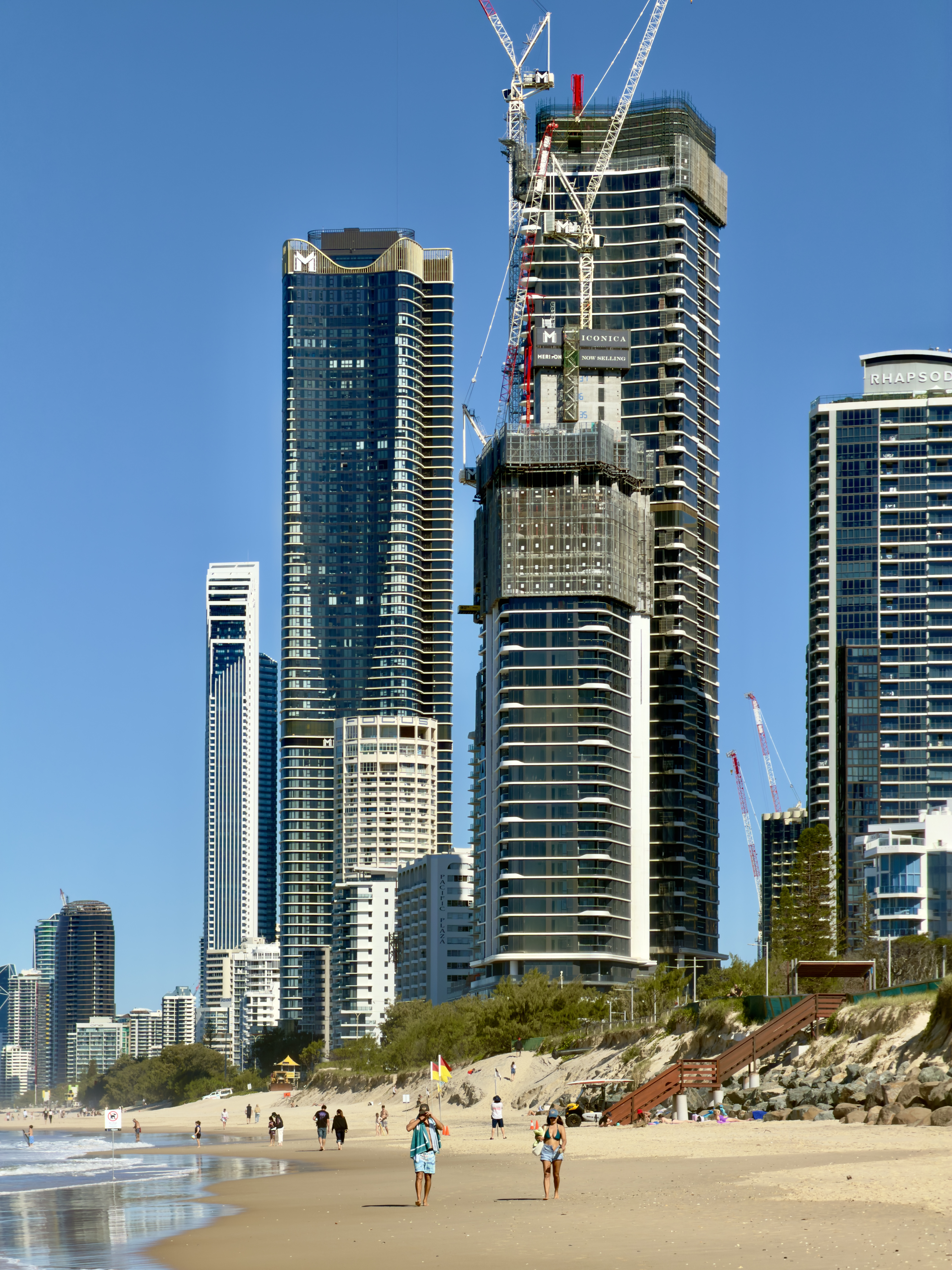
- Iconica Residences under construction in July 2026

General information
- Location: Surfers Paradise, Gold Coast, Queensland, Australia
- Coordinates: 27.991707°S 153.429925°E
- Construction started: 2021
- Opening: scheduled 2027

Height
- Height: 265 and 180 m

Technical details
- Floor count: 80 and 54

Design and construction
- Architecture firm: DBI
- Developer: Meriton

The Iconica Residences is a residential skyscraper complex on the Gold Coast, Australia, which is currently under construction. Designed by DBI, the two towers comprising the complex will stand at a height of 265 and 180 metres.

== History ==
Construction of the complex, developed by Meriton and designed by the Australian architecture firm DBI, began in 2021, with completion scheduled for 2027.

== Description ==
Located on the Surfers Paradise waterfront, the complex consists of two residential towers of 80 and 54 storeys, with heights of 265 and 180 metres respectively. The towers, which will contain 637 apartments, will also feature retail spaces at ground level and extensive shared amenities, including outdoor and indoor swimming pools, a spa, and a gym.
