= Magic Mountain, Nobby Beach =

Former theme park on the Gold Coast, Australia

Magic Mountain
- Previously known as Original name unknown
- Interactive map of Magic Mountain
- Location: Chairlift Avenue, Nobby Beach, Queensland, Australia
- Coordinates: 28°3′41.99″S 153°26′23.4″E
- Status: Defunct
- Opened: 1962
- Closed: 1991
- Owner: Thomas Ward (1962–1976); George Carrett (1976–1982)
- Attendance: 40,000 (in 1962)

Attractions
- Total: 10
- Water rides: 1

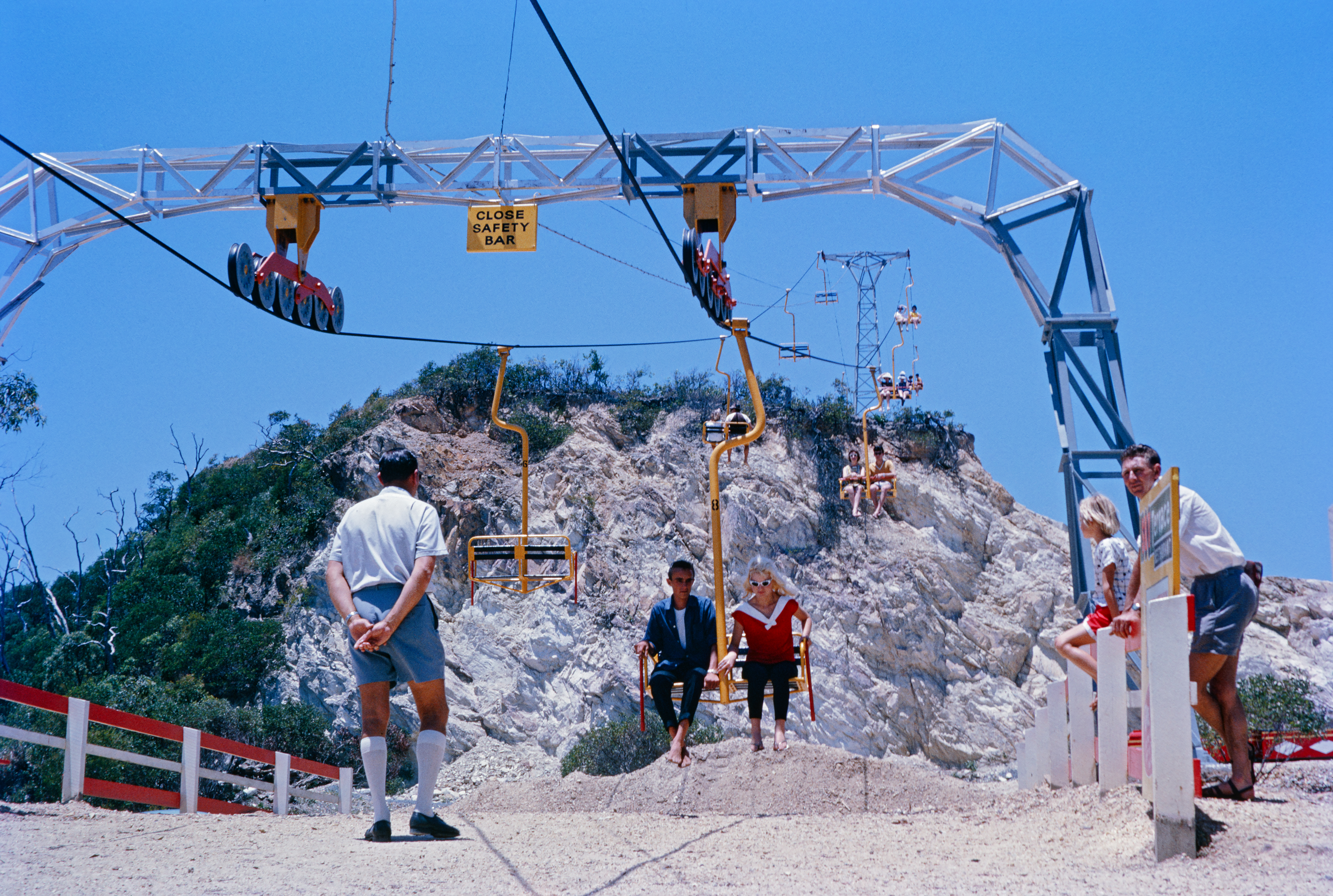
Nobby's Head Aerial Cableway/Chairlift, November 1962

Magic Mountain was an amusement park in Nobby Beach, Queensland, Australia which operated from 1962 to 1991. The amusement park was situated atop a mountain which now houses a variety of properties.

== Origins ==
In 1962, Page Newman built the Nobby Beach chairlift that later formed part of the Magic Mountain entertainment park. A cafeteria was built on top of the outcrop. It was a gamble that paid off, in its first year of operation the chair-lift carried 40,000 people. A Magic Castle was built, giving the park the "magic" theme. Page Newman sold the park in 1976 to George Carrett. Carrett owned the park until 1982 when it was sold again. In 1983, the new owner commenced intensive development with A$13.6 million spent to extend the Magic Mountain theme park.

== Attractions ==
- Castle
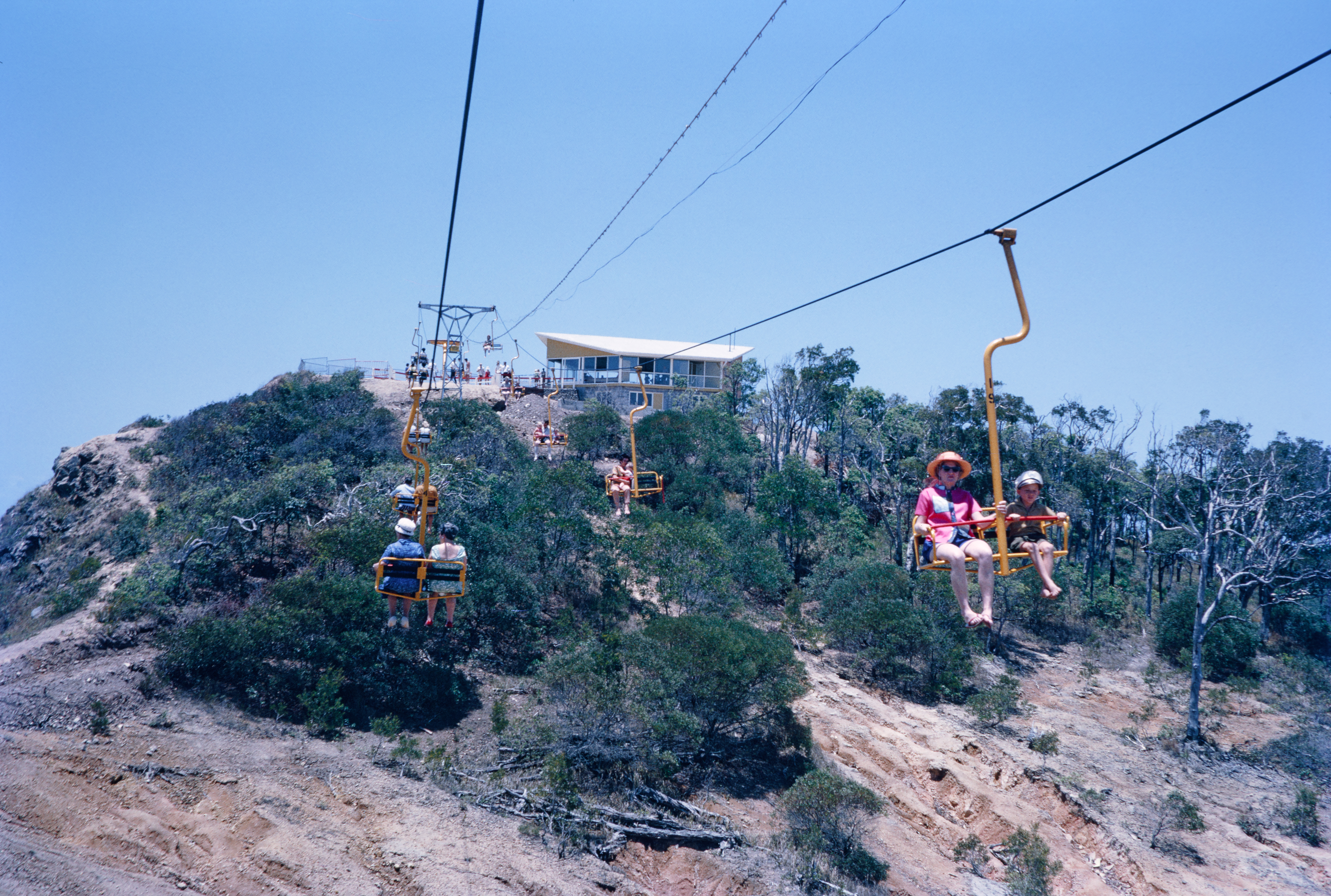
- Nobby's Head Aerial Cableway/Chairlift, November 1962
  Chairlift
- Chair O Planes
- Dodgem Cars
- Double-Decker Carousel
- Parachute Drop Tower (Giant Drop)
- Plane Ride
- Train
- Splashdown
- Ball Pit
- Jumping Castle
- Giant Cargo Nets
- Carousel
- Tram ride
- Magic Show in dedicated theatre
- Flickers (Old B&W silent movies)

== Closure and demolition ==
Magic Mountain closed in mid 1987 and remained a derelict unused site until 1991 when the land was cleared and subdivided into two portions in 1995. The defunct site was briefly used as a set for a scene in the remake of the TV series Mission Impossible.

The land was sold and is now the site of restaurants, shops and predominantly, Magic Mountain Resort Apartments, named in its memory. The only remnants of the chairlift is a street sign, Chairlift Avenue. The chairlift was moved to Dreamworld, while the parachute tower was moved to Australia's Wonderland. Both attractions have since been closed.

== See also ==
- List of defunct amusement parks
