= Southport Central =

Mixed-use, multi-purpose development in Queensland, Australia

Southport Central (Tower A)

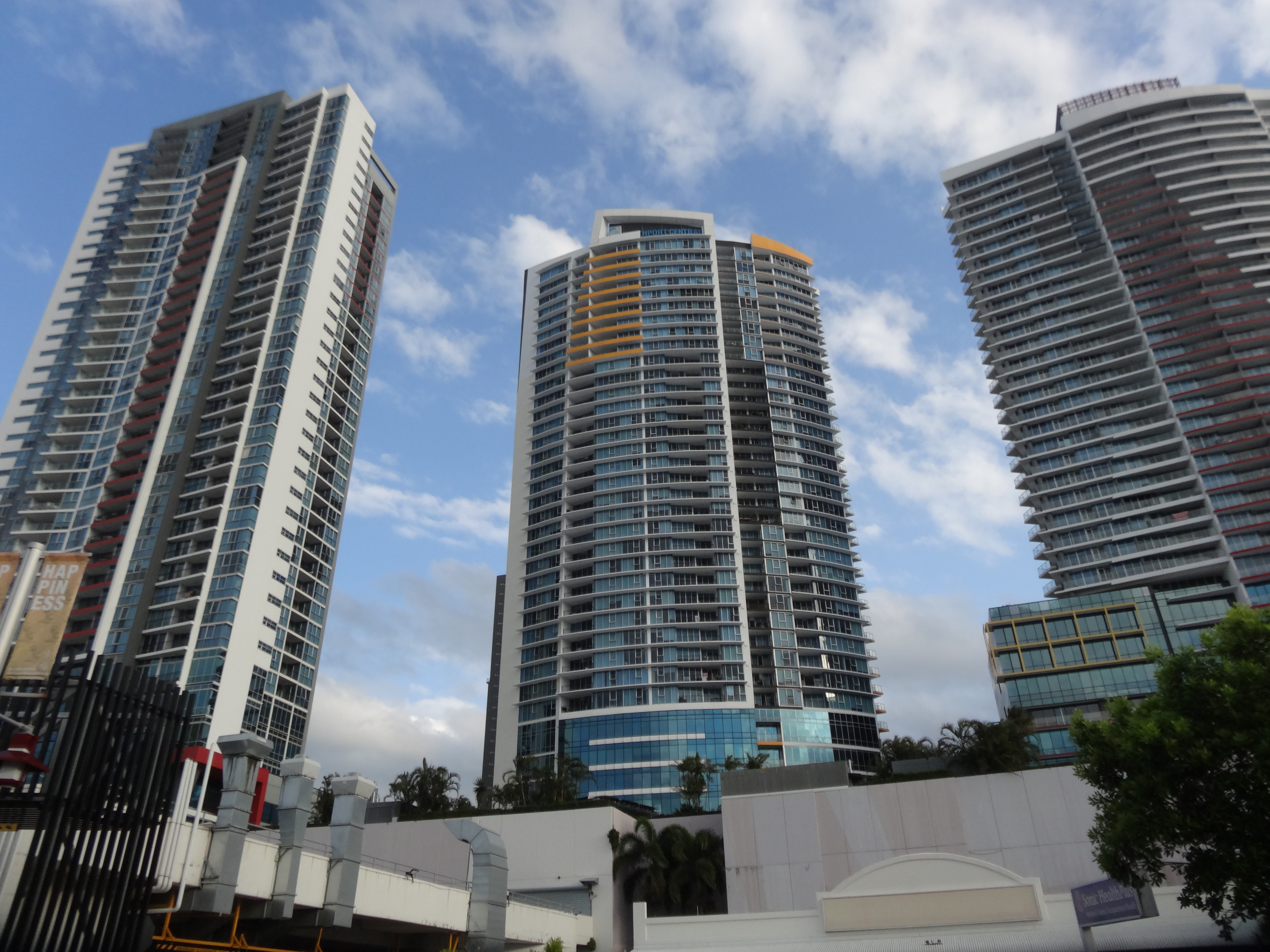
- Three main towers

General information
- Status: Open
- Type: Residential, office
- Location: Gold Coast, Queensland, Australia
- Coordinates: 27.9700613°S 153.4136331°E
- Completed: 2007

Height
- Roof: 127 m (417 ft)

Technical details
- Floor count: 40

Design and construction
- Architect: Archidiom Design
- Developer: Raptis Group

Website
- southporttowers.com.au

Southport Central is an 18,130 m^{2} mixed Use, multi-purpose development at the corner of Scarborough and Lawson Streets in Southport, Queensland, Australia. It comprises three towers with integrated shopping and commercial precincts with a total value of $700 million. The towers are constructed with concrete in a modern style. The building was developed by Raptis Group. The architectural work was conducted by Archidiom Design.

== Tower A ==
Southport Central's 40 level Tower A was completed in August 2006 and has 268 apartments with one, two or three bedroom configurations. The building was opened in 2007.

== Tower B ==
The 39 level Tower B has 262 apartments consisting of one bed plus study, two bedroom or two bedroom plus study. This tower was opened in April 2008.

== Tower C ==
The third and final tower, completed in early 2009 has 39 levels and a total of 258 apartments including one bed plus study, two bedroom or two bedroom plus study. This building was constructed by Landaning Pty Ltd.

On 10 September 2008 the ASX placed a trading halt on the company when receivers took control of the company's Southport Central development. Sub-contractors walked off the site, afraid that they were not going to be paid for their work. Receivers to the Jim Raptis development, Capital Finance, took control of the development later that month.

In April 2009 construction on the project was complete.

== See also ==
- List of tallest buildings in Australia
- List of tallest buildings on the Gold Coast, Queensland
