= List of buildings designed by John Dalton =

The following is a list of buildings designed by English Australian architect John Dalton.

Year	Name	Location	Status	Other Information	Image
1952	Dalton residence	Moordale Street, Chapel Hill, Brisbane	Existing	Student project	
1956	Spinks residence	Quentin Street, Chapel Hill, Brisbane	Existing		
1956	Head residence	Fleming Road, Chapel Hill, Brisbane	Undetermined	Moved to Darling Downs.	
1956	Walker residence	Ferny Grove, Brisbane	Undetermined		
1956	Burnie Board residence	St Lucia, Brisbane	Demolished		
1956	Burnie Board Administration Building	Ipswich, Queensland	Unbuilt		
1957	Young residence	Frost Street, Mount Gravatt, Brisbane	Undetermined		
1957	Plywood house for Queensland Plywood Board Corporation (Competition entry)	Brisbane Exhibition Grounds	Existing	With Peter Heathwood. Moved to 23 Kurowara Street, The Gap, Brisbane.	
1958	MLC Building shop fit-out	Edward Street, Brisbane CBD	Undetermined	With Peter Heathwood.	
1960	Battersby flats	Quinton Street, Kangaroo Point, Brisbane			
1960	Burnie Board Display	Brisbane Exhibition Grounds	Undetermined	Exhibition only. Since removed.	
1960	Dalton residence	Fig Tree Pocket, Brisbane	Existing		
1960	Farbach residence	Moordale Street, Chapel Hill, Brisbane	Existing		
1960	Henricks residence	Homestead, Roma, Queensland	Undetermined		
1960	Masters residence	Sophia Street, Kenmore, Brisbane	Existing		
1960	Tennett flats	Terrace Street, Toowong, Brisbane	Existing	Architect's apartment for a period of time.	
1960	Professor Whitehead residence	Kirkdale Street, Chapel Hill, Brisbane	Existing		
1961	Mayo residence	Kroshanne Street Aspley, Brisbane	Existing		
1962	Brick manufacturer's residence	Ipswich Road, Brisbane	Undetermined		
1962	Clayton residence	Retreat Road, Aspley, Brisbane	Existing		
1962	Collier residence	Equinox Street, Taringa, Brisbane	Undetermined		
1962	Crozier residence	Woodfield Road, Pullenvale, Brisbane	Demolished.		
1962	Leverington residence	Kenmore Road, Kenmore, Brisbane	Existing		
1962	Neale residence	Chelmer, Brisbane	Demolished		
1963	Brisbane Arts Theatre	Petrie Terrace, Brisbane	Existing		
1963	Burke residence	Waterworks Road, Ashgrove, Brisbane	Undetermined		
1963	Hinstedt town houses	East Brisbane, Brisbane	Undetermined		
1963	Magee residence	Woodfield Road, Pullenvale, Brisbane	Demolished.		
1963	Morocco homestead	St George, Queensland	Undetermined		
1963	Pickworth Town Houses	Waterloo Street, East Brisbane, Brisbane	Undetermined		
1963	Stirling residence	Moggill Road, Moggill, Brisbane	Undetermined		
1963	Wipple homestead	St. George, Queensland	Undetermined		
1964	Belligoi residence	Munro Street, Indooroopilly, Brisbane	Existing		
1964	Deignan residence	Hoya Street, Holland Park, Brisbane	Undetermined		
1964	Kenmore Anglican Church	Kenmore, Brisbane	Competition entry	Unbuilt	
1964	Stoneham residence	Kenmore Road, Kenmore, Brisbane	Existing		
1964	Watson residence	Deerhurst Road, Brookfield, Brisbane	Existing		
1964	Wareham residence	Kenmore Road, Kenmore, Brisbane	Existing		
1964	Wilson residence	Mount Coot-tha Road, Brisbane	Demolished.		
1965	Davidson residence	Ardell Street, Kenmore, Brisbane	Existing		
1965	Quilpie Memorial Pool	Brolga Street, Quilpie	Existing		
1965	Dr Whitfield residence	Cadiz Street, Indooroopilly, Brisbane	Existing		
1966	Barrett residence	31 Kingussie Street, Kenmore, Brisbane	Existing		
1966	Buckley residence	14 Fontayne Street, Aspley, Brisbane	Existing		
1966	Graham residence	Gower Street, Indooroopilly, Brisbane	Existing		
1967	Kaeshagen residence	Musgrave Street, Kenmore, Brisbane	Existing		
1967	Peden residence	Glenhurst Road, Pinjarra Hills, Brisbane	Existing		
1968	Barclay residence	Indus Street, Camp Hill, Brisbane	Undetermined		
1968	Bucknell residence	Sutton Street, Chelmer, Brisbane	Undetermined		
1968	Clark residence	Prospect Street, Sherwood, Brisbane	Existing		
1968	Chi display residences	Display house at Mimosa Downs	Undetermined		
1968	Crozier residence	Woodfield Road, Brookfield, Brisbane	Undetermined		
1968	Dr. Douglas residence	Hill Crescent, West Gladstone, Queensland	Undetermined		
1968	Gamin residence	Skyline Drive, Burleigh Heads, Queensland	Undetermined		
1968	Hodges residence	Clontarf, Redcliffe, Queensland	Undetermined		
1968	Hollingsworth residence	Helse Street, Bardon, Brisbane	Undetermined		
1968	Hughes residence	Helse Street, Bardon, Brisbane	Undetermined		
1968	Hughes residence	Brookfield Road, Kenmore, Brisbane	Existing		
1968	Krebs residence	Brookfield Road, Kenmore, Brisbane	Existing		
1968	Leitch residence	Sunset Road, Kenmore, Brisbane	Existing		
1968	McDonald residence	Banbury Street, Carina, Brisbane	Undetermined		
1968	Rabaa residence	Kimba Street, Indooroopilly, Brisbane	Existing		
1968	Swan residence	Lois Street, Kenmore, Brisbane	Existing		
1969	Bolton Holiday Units	Attunga Heights Road, Noosa Heads, Queensland	Undetermined		
1969	Bowers residence	Castile Street, Indooroopilly, Brisbane	Existing		
1969	Ebzery residence	Tallaroon Street, Jindalee, Brisbane	Undetermined		
1969	Jamieson residence	Kenmore Road, Kenmore, Brisbane	Existing		
1969	Hooker Homes	Adelaide, South Australia		for the Timber Development Association of South Australia Inc	
1969	King residence	Castile Street, Indooroopilly, Brisbane	Existing		
1969	McGregor residence	Musgrave Street, Kenmore, Brisbane	Existing		
1969	Neve residence	Queenscroft Street, Chelmer, Brisbane	Existing		
1969	Smith residence	Brookfield Road, Brookfield, Brisbane	Existing		
1970	Cameron residence	Bycroft Street and Heron Road, Pullenvale, Brisbane	Existing		
1970	Griffin residence	Long Road, Mount Tamborine, Queensland	Undetermined		
1970	Handicrafts of Asia Shop	Lennons Plaza, Brisbane	Undetermined		
1970	Meek residence	Haven Road, Pullenvale, Brisbane	Existing		
1970	Robinson residence	Luckins Street, Aspley, Brisbane	Existing		
1971	Read residence	Lavereigh Street, Indooroopilly, Brisbane	Undetermined		
1971	Robert residence	Lavereigh Street, Indooroopilly, Brisbane	Undetermined		
1972	Myers residence	31 Wonalee Street, Kenmore, Brisbane	Existing		
1972	Salter residence	Fig Tree Pocket Road, Fig Tree Pocket, Brisbane	Undetermined		
1972	Vice-Chancellor's Residence	Walcott Street, St Lucia (University of Queensland, Brisbane)	Demolished.		
1973	Musgrave residence	64 Roseberry Street, Chelmer, Brisbane	Existing		
1973	Rosenblum residence	Kneale Street, Holland Park, Brisbane	Existing		
1974	QIT Arts, Crafts and Music Centre (for Queensland Department of Works)	Darling Downs Institute of Technology (now University of Southern Queensland), Toowoomba, Queensland	Existing		
1974	Louis residence	Alton Estate, The Gap, Brisbane	Undetermined		
1975	Anderson residence	Kruger Road, Carbrook, Queensland	Undetermined		
1975	Covacevich residence	Stanton Road, Smithfield, Cairns, North Queensland	Undetermined		
1975	Lambtail Cottage	Herbert Street, Allora, Darling Downs, Queensland	Undetermined	Renovation	
1975	O’Brien residence	Moyston Street, Aspley, Brisbane	Undetermined		
1975	Dunlop residence	Jesmond Street, Indooroopilly, Brisbane	Existing		
1975	Peden Farm (Manager's residence)	Warroolba, AIS Stud, 38 Glenhurst Road, Pinjarra Hills	Existing		
1975	University House	Griffith University, Nathan, Brisbane	Undetermined		
1976	Bardon Professional Development Centre	Bardon, Brisbane	Demolished		
1976	MacFarlane residence	Repton Street, Pullenvale, Brisbane	Undetermined		
1977	Chick residence	Roedean Street, Fig Tree Pocket, Brisbane	Existing		
1977	McGuckin residence	Barfood Street, Moorooka	Undetermined		
1978	TAFE Hall of Residence, Kelvin Grove	Kelvin Grove, Brisbane (now part of the Queensland University of Technology campus)	Partially demolished, listed on the Queensland Heritage Register		
1979	Boundy residence	Mandalay Street, Fig Tree Pocket, Brisbane	Undetermined		
1979	Donovan's Building Medical Centre	Herbert Street, Allora, Queensland	Undetermined		
1979	Hunt residence	Indus Street, Camp Hill, Brisbane	Existing		
1979	Pegler residence	144 Turner Road, Kedron, Brisbane	Undetermined		
1981	Coghlan residence	Allora, Darling Downs, Queensland	Undetermined		
1981	Dunlop residence	Creswick Street, Ascot, Brisbane	Undetermined		
1981	Morahan residence	Corner Esplanade and Benalla Streets, Manly	Existing		
1981	O’Dwyer (Mt Manning Pastoral Company)	Mt Manning Homestead, Darling Downs	Undetermined		
1982	Watkins Medical Centre	Wickham Terrace, Spring Hill	Existing		
1983	Famavola residence	Benalla Street, Manly, Brisbane	Undetermined		
1983	Queensland Department of Housing and Construction	Sherwood, Brisbane	Unbuilt		
1985	Dick's Deck	North Stradbroke	Undetermined		
1985	Hendry residence	Carwoola Street, Bardon, Brisbane	Existing		
1985	O’Dwyer residence	Banchooy, Cambooya, Queensland	Undetermined		
1987	Byth residence	Meiers Road, Indooroopilly, Brisbane	Existing		
	Motel at Hastings Street Noosa	Noosa Heads, Queensland	Undetermined		
	Slater residence	St Lucia, Brisbane	Undetermined		
	Halex residence	Durham Street, St Lucia, Brisbane	Existing		
		Bozzato Place (formerly Kenmore Road, Kenmore, Brisbane	Existing		
