= John Dalton (architect) =

English Australian architect, writer, editor and artist

John Harold Dalton
- Born: John Harold Dalton; 30 December 1927; Leeds, Yorkshire, England
- Died: 27 May 2007 (aged 79)
- Education: University of Queensland
- Occupation: Architect
- Awards: RAIA Bronze Medals
- Practice: Dalton and Heathwood; John Dalton and Associates
- Buildings: John Dalton's Residential Architecture; University Vice Chancellors Residence; TAFE Hall of Residence, Kelvin Grove

John Harold Dalton FRAIA (1927–2007) was an English Australian architect, writer, editor and artist.

Dalton's body of work includes a number of domestic and commercial projects located in Queensland, Australia, where his architectural practice was established. Dalton's work has been widely published with exposure in notable publications such as Architecture and Arts and his work exhibited at numerous exhibitions. Dalton was known for climatically responsive designs which responded to the subtropical climate in which they were located. Dalton was also known for his contributions to architectural journals such as Architecture in Australia, on topics such as regional and climatic issues in architecture.

== Personal life and education ==
Dalton was born in Leeds, Yorkshire, England on 30 December 1927, he was educated at Adel school in Leeds, England after which he was awarded a National Diploma in building from Leeds technical college which he attended from 1940 to 1945. Dalton served in the Royal Air Force from 1946 to 1948 as an architectural draftsman. In 1950 he immigrated to Australia where he furthered his tertiary education by part-time study at the Queensland Institute of Technology (now Queensland University of Technology) and the University of Queensland for certificate and diploma courses whilst working part-time in various Brisbane based architects offices, a requirement of the courses. In 1956 he completed his tertiary education receiving a diploma in architecture from Queensland University. Dalton generally had a positive opinion of his architectural education, speaking highly of the academic professors stating, "the members of the profession were 'honourable men' and very highly regarded".

In 1957 Dalton registered as an architect and worked in practice, starting in partnership with Peter Heathwood as Dalton and Heathwood and then establishing John Dalton Architect and Associates in 1959. From 1963 to 1971, whilst in practice, Dalton lectured fifth year architecture students at the Queensland University on a part-time basis. After being in practice for 22 years Dalton semi-retired in 1979 moving to the town of Allora located in the Darling Downs, he returned to Toowong to continue working in practice on a part-time basis. Dalton died in 2007 from cancer at the age of 79 years.

== Architectural work ==
=== Early career ===
In Brisbane Dalton worked as an architectural drafter in the offices of the State Works department, Brisbane City Council (under architect Frank Costello), Cook and Kerrison, Commonwealth Works Department, Hayes and Scott and Theo Thynne and Associates (under Don Winsen and Robin Gibson). Hayes and Scott and Theo Thynne and Associates in particular were seen as Brisbane's most progressive firms, Hayes and Scott left a lasting impression on Dalton describing it as "the absolute pinnacle of a student's training...I could see they (the students) were getting wonderful training. You spent all you time running around Hayes and Scott's buildings, fascinated by how it all worked out – drawing board to reality".

After completing his university education in 1956 Dalton formed a practice with fellow Queensland University graduate Peter Heathwood who had also worked at Theo Thynne and Associates. Their architectural education and the design ethos at Theo Thynne and Associates had instilled in Dalton and Heathwood a climatic responsibility which they synthesised into their body of work. The partnership began after Heathwood had completed a design for a plywood exhibition house for the Industrial Fair in 1957, Heathwood handed the project to Dalton to complete the working drawings whilst he went on his honeymoon. The design which used plywood in various configurations won the competition, was constructed for the exhibition and was later moved to the Brisbane suburb of The Gap. In 1956 Dalton and Heathwood as a practice was established at 307 Queen Street in the Brisbane CBD. The post world war II era was a boom period which aided in continued project work. Heathwood recalls that "he and Dalton although competitive in the design achievements were never competitive for work".

Dalton and Heathwood had a brief partnership but completed several projects in the two-year period they were together, they continued for another year as an associateship. The work was typically authored by either Dalton or Heathwood, rarely working together on a project. The following lists the projects that Dalton was credited whilst at Dalton and Heathwood.

- 1956 Walker residence, Ferny Grove.
- 1956 Head residence, Chapel Hill.
- 1956 Spinks residence, Indooroopilly.
- 1958 J.Farren Price Former MLC building shop fitout. (Heathwood also credited for design authorship)
- 1959 Dalton residence, Fig Tree Pocket.

=== Architectural influences ===
Noel J. Robinson speculates that Dalton was first influenced by Eric Buchanan with whom Dalton worked alongside as a draftsman for the Brisbane City Council. According to Buchanan, Dalton had no firm plans to become an architect and Robinson speculates it was Buchanan's desire to become an architect that may have influenced Dalton to enrol part-time at the Queensland University. Hayes and Scott were largely influential in Dalton's professional development, their climatically aware designs related to Brisbane's sub-tropical climate by use of ventilated skylights, ventilated floor spaces and raised verandahs. Whilst Dalton preferred the work of Eddie Hayes, (whose focus was on form, texture, colour, space and feeling) it was Cam Scott who heavily influenced Dalton's architectural philosophy.

According to Dalton the Queensland University School of Architecture at his time of study was not engineering nor international style based, instead its approach to design was based on Queensland vernacular architecture. Dalton's senior lecturers at university were Robert Percy Cummings and Bruce Lucas who practised as Lucas and Cummings during the inter-war period. Their houses featured wide-eave hipped roofs, sun hoods over lower storey windows, tightly placed verandahs and room layouts that regarded solar orientation and cross ventilation. Further their houses eschewed traditional vernacular timber ornamentation instead utilising the structural forms as the architectural expression. They transferred this approach to the design curriculum which essentially focused on design for the Queensland climate. It is in this environment that Dalton received his tertiary education.

At university Dalton was influenced by the writings and work of Richard Neutra, Sydney Ancher, Harry Seidler and more broadly, by Lewis Mumford's Culture of Cities and Rousseau and Romanticism. Robinson suggests Neutra's writings such as his book Mysteries and realities of the site indicate a design approach integrated with the site and the integration of indoor and outdoor space which both can be seen in Dalton's work. Seidler's influence Robinson suggests, is in the structural expression, precision and finish, whilst Ancher's influence he argues is in his use of open planning, flat terraces, glass walls, low pitched roofs with wide overhangs and precise white structures which contrasted with the surrounding bush-lands. On the international style of architecture Dalton stated it was important as it made Australian architects look to an Australian response "and thereafter rediscover and develop an indigenous philosophy".

Whilst working at Theo Thynne and Associates Dalton met design architect Robin Gibson who Dalton cites was just as influential on him as Cam Scott. Gibson's approach was primarily a functionalist one with architecture coming from the emotional content and response from the observer. Gibson and Dalton continued association as friends after leaving Theo Thynne and Associates, Gibson saying of Dalton, "there is not a better domestic architect in Australia: his houses are positive statements for people". Dalton has also cited Don Winsen as an influence on his work. Winsen was the chief designer at Theo Thynne and Associates. Robinson also suggests Peter Heathwood as a possible influence on Dalton, particularly in his use of texture and vernacular elements such as timber batten screening.

=== John Dalton Architect and Associates ===
Dalton established John Dalton Architect and Associates in 1959 in the Dalton and Heathwood office located at 307 Queen Street. He later relocated the office to 333 Queen Street in 1975 and later in 1987 to Sylvan Road, Toowong. The majority of Dalton's built body of work occurred in this period. Since Dalton was unable to keep a large staff he had to limit the size of the buildings he undertook to a domestic scale, making a majority of Dalton's work detached housing. (Clients typically had a professional background.) He also undertook select larger scale commercial projects (University and Government clients). His built body of work occurs most densely in the Brisbane suburbs of Toowong, Kenmore, Chapel Hill, Fig Tree Pocket and Indooroopilly. He also completed projects in the regional Queensland towns of Toowoomba, St George and Cairns. Selected works were widely published in Architecture in Australia, receiving numerous awards and recognition from the Royal Australian Institute of Architects.

Robinson classifies Dalton's residential work into different categories based on the visual style and year in which they were produced. The classification applies to Dalton's domestic work and not commercial projects which vary in style.

==== Anonymous houses (1956–1961) ====
These houses were typically simple stud framed, low pitched asbestos cement roofs, sliding glass external doors and louvred walls. These houses featured climatic considerations including being raised off the ground for sub floor ventilation, wide eaved overhangs, boarded screens for sun control and reflective foil insulation. Fireplaces feature in the design with largely proportioned chimneys. Robinson suggests these houses still exhibit trademarks of Hayes and Scott so do not feature any strong style as such, remaining more anonymous.

==== Linear houses (1961–1965) ====
The 'linear houses' often had linear floor plans with the long side oriented north and low pitched roofs supported on three lines of steel beams which were visually emphasised. Full heights windows with frameless sliding glass windows and louvred walls give opportunities for maximum cross ventilation and emphasise a horizontal expression. Pergolas over courtyards provide an extension of the indoor environment to the outdoor. Chimneys become more prominent in the building composition with Dalton making external walls white or cream face brick or bagged white painted brick or concrete blockwork.

==== Emphasis on roof form (1965–1969) ====
While retaining the use of the linear plan (but also featuring U-shaped plans), Dalton placed emphasis on the roof of the house by utilising steeper pitched skillion roofs, often crippled to provide high level ventilation with timber rafters exposed internally. Brickwork is bagged and painted white, which contrasted with the dark stained timbers expressed externally giving a warmer feeling to the house.

==== Fragmented houses (1969–1975) ====
This period contains elements of all previous periods. Larger commissions resulted in less rigid structures. Roofs are steeply pitched often with multiple roofs planes being employed. The architecture becomes more three dimensional. These houses often retain the white bagged brickwork and stained timber aesthetic established in the previous period. In some instances Dalton used walls of insect screen with exposed timber mullions and experimented with herringboned timber battening.

===== Queensland houses (1975–1987) =====
From 1975 to his final architectural works in 1987, Dalton's residential architecture shifted gears towards a quieter stylistic expression. Many of the forms and details to be found in Dalton's later works reflect both Dalton's close collaboration with many of his clients and his deep belief in the value of carrying forth vernacular responses to living in the Queensland climate. His residential architecture is imbued with the time he spent living in regional Western Queensland.

===== Other significant buildings =====
- TAFE Hall of Residence, Kelvin Grove, listed on the Queensland Heritage Register
- Bardon Professional Development Centre, Bardon
- QIT Arts, Crafts and Music Centre, University of Southern Queensland

==== Climatic design ====
A common theme in Dalton's design is design based around climate. He stated, "If somebody backs me into corner and says, 'What do you stand for?' when you've seen all the other parades of cultures and art and things, I say I'm still for design for climate because it works!" The origins of this thinking can be traced to his time at Hayes and Scott, Theo Thynne and Associates and his architectural education under Lucas and Cummings at Queensland University. Dalton particularly attributes his climatic design philosophy to the teachings of Bruce Lucas, remembering, "we used to sit with our protractors working out the angle of the sun penetration".

To Dalton climatic design had a poetic dimension. He was inspired after moving from the dark and cold climate of Yorkshire to warm and sunny Queensland. In 1977 in Belle magazine he stated, "Design for climate is the simple solution for all our architectural endeavour in Queensland. It is the mainspring for all the magical qualities that add up to a vital architecture. ...Our delight is to build in the sun and gather poetic inspiration from the sunlight, shade and shadow that is our heritage".

According to Charles Ham (an associate in John Dalton Architect and Associates since 1969) the design priorities of Dalton were the environmental system, the building system, the aesthetics of form, volume and surface and then the activity of the user. In complex larger buildings more emphasis is placed on the user activity. Dalton's environmental systems he employed included;

- Open planning to maximise cross ventilation.
- Large roof overhangs to shade walls.
- Light frame structures.
- Sun blades and adjustable sun louvres to pergolas.
- Floor to ceiling openings on the northern side for breezes.
- North facing terraces and verandahs.
- Linear floor plan with northern orientation.
- Internal breezeways.
- Horizontal louvres and lattice.
- Louvred timber doors.
- Roof clerestories.
- Continuous aluminium grille at eaves for roof cavity ventilation.
- Reflective foil insulation.
- Roof water spray system for evaporative cooling.

== Written work ==
Apart from his work as architect proper, John Dalton was a writer, and was involved as contributor to a handful of Australian architectural publications as well as a pamphleteer of sorts.

=== Contributor ===
In 1960 Dalton was appointed Queensland correspondent to Cross-Section, a journal founded by Robin Gibson and published by the University of Melbourne's Department of Architecture from 1952 to 1971, and in 1963 was also appointed Queensland correspondent to Architecture in Australia, the Royal Australian Institute of Architects' official publication. In his two official roles as correspondent, Dalton was caught in the midst of the liberal and modernist Cross-Section, and the heavily scrutinised as well as bureaucratic Architecture in Australia, and in 1964 following criticism of the Queensland Newspapers Building by Conrad and Gargett in an edition of Cross-Section, he received "disciplinary action for undermining the standing of the profession." In 1967, Dalton reports being dismissed from his role as Queensland correspondent to Architecture in Australia against a background of increasing tension from his place as mutineer within the Publications Committee.

Alongside official positions as correspondent, Dalton also often contributed to the Australian Journal of Architecture and Arts, a magazine that featured many of his projects throughout his architectural career, and additionally, he contributed to the first issue of Scarab, published in 1965 by the Queensland Architectural Students Association, a publication he praised in an edition of Cross-Section.

Through his published pieces, Dalton reveals his occupation with, what could be redolent of, the idioms of a Queensland architecture as well as the concerns he has regarding the state of Australian architecture at the time. Dalton sensitively documents the particulars of building in Queensland, in doing so, he reflects on the "characteristic qualities" of Queensland architecture in a period of changing semblances, covers the minutiae of building in and responding to the local climate, as well as exploring the sensitivity of the ubiquitous verandah. Beyond Queensland, Dalton engages in a consistent critique of the attitudes and behaviours of the profession, through the reviewing of buildings within Australia and overseas, Dalton exemplifies a disdain for the conservative and eulogises works which possess an intricate understanding of the relationship between building and place. Additionally, he admonishes the scheming bureaucratic processes in which authorities allow for the development of cities (particularly in Brisbane), as well as bluntly lambasting the lack of concern the profession in Australia has for the future, pleading for "foresight" in the midst of "hindsight and insight" and a framework for supposition and experimentation.

=== Pamphleteer ===
From 1966 to 1972, feeling a sense of affinity with the activism of students he was exposed to through his position as a teacher at the University of Queensland's School of Architecture, John Dalton produced a series of pamphlets consisting of "images and text, original and sourced material on an eclectic range of topics" with an intention to instigate further student activism. In 1966, amidst the disagreeable Queensland architectural profession and the increasing frustration amongst architectural students, Dalton released the first of his self-written and self-published "handbill style" pamphlets, Broadside (initially titled Broadsheet), to architecture students at the University of Queensland and Queensland Institute of Technology. 22 confirmed issues of Broadside were published over a three-year period until 1968, and was followed in 1969 by the release of diametrix, with 23 confirmed issues published, ending in 1972. Inasmuch as providing support for students, Dalton's pamphlets also operated in the testing of his own architectural thinking and ideas that were unlike that of dominant conservative Queensland architectural profession at the time. As well as using his own, Dalton sourced material from student conventions, magazines, books and poems from a range of authors including Serge Chermayeff, Buckminster Fuller, Colin St. John Wilson, Aldo van Eyck, Warren Chalk, Edward de Bono and Gough Whitlam amongst others. By 1972, Dalton and his wife became more occupied with their house in Allora, Queensland, potentially explaining why the pamphleteering came to an ambiguous halt.

== Artistic work ==
Alongside his architectural works, John Dalton is identified as having been an artist, having actively produced paintings even as a student in 1957. Artworks by him have appeared in notable Australian architectural journals – having designed the cover piece for the July 1960 edition of the Australian Journal of Architecture and Arts, as well as contributing an article entitled "The Verandah" in the March 1964 edition of Architecture in Australia that was accompanied by six oil paintings by Dalton.

Dalton's belief in the "art' of architecture over any sense of "scholarship" is evident in the processes that he adhered to and perhaps his artworks are an embodiment of this attitude. They inform the approach of his architectural practice and the iteration of the design thinking that makes them synonymous with his architectural process. The six paintings that appear in "The Verandah", "compositionally abstract and geometrical" yet equally "formal", as Dalton states, "(develops) a new respect... for the subject and... finds a new life in the anatomy of a verandah" and serve as studies on the qualities, both in form and experience, of the verandah.

Additionally, and perhaps more conventionally, Dalton served as an Executive Member of the Council for the Queensland Art Gallery Society from 1960 until 1974, as well as being an Executive Member of the Contemporary Art Society of Australia in 1965 and later, a Council Member from 1966 until 1970.

Even in his later life of semi-retirement, living in Lambtail Cottage, Allora from 1979, Dalton avidly continued producing artworks, pursuing painting, sculpting, photography, creating collages and drawing.

== Recognition and awards ==
- 1956 – 1st prize for Queensland Plywood Board's Open Competition for plywood board display house (Partnership with Peter Heathwood).
- 1959–69 – "Arts and architecture award for the "ten best buildings of the year in Australia" for his own house, Fig Tree Pocket Road, Fig Tree Pocket.
- 1960–61 – "Arts and architecture award for the "ten best buildings of the year in Australia" for complex of flats at Terrace Street, Toowong.
- 1961–62 – "Arts and architecture award for the "ten best buildings of the year in Australia" for the Leverington House, Kenmore Road, Kenmore.
- 1962 – Queensland Chapter of the Royal Australian Institute of Architects "commendation" for the Leverington House, Kenmore Road, Kenmore.
- 1962 – First prize in limited competition for the design of the Queensland Brick Manufacturers project house.
- 1964 – Queensland Chapter of the Royal Australian Institute of Architects "Bronze medal award for meritorious architecture" for the Wilson House, Mt Coot-Tha Road, Mt Coot-Tha.
- 1964 – First prize for a limited competition for the design of a proposed Anglican church, Kenmore.
- 1967 – Queensland chapter of the Royal Australian Institute of Architects "Bronze medal award for meritorious architecture" for Graham House Gower Street, Toowong.
- 1971 – Timber Development Association Award, South Australia.
- 1972 – Telegraph Newspaper design award for the Salter house, Fig Tree Pocket Road, Fig Tree Pocket.
- 1972 – Queensland Chapter of the Royal Australian Institute of Architects "Award for meritorious architecture" for the Vice-Chancellors residence, University of Queensland, St. Lucia.
- 1975 – Queensland Chapter of the Royal Australian Institute of Architects "Bronze medal award for meritorious architecture" for the Pedan House, Glenhurst Street, Moggill.
- 1978 – Queensland Chapter of the Royal Australian Institute of Architects "Bronze medal award for meritorious architecture" for the Bardon professional centre, Bardon.
- 1979 – Queensland Chapter of the Royal Australian Institute of Architects "Bronze medal award for meritorious architecture" for the TAFE Halls of Residence, Kelvin Grove.
- 1981 – Queensland Chapter of the Royal Australian Institute of Architects "Historical renovation\preservation citation" for Lambtail Cottage, Herbert Street, Allora.
- 1982 – Queensland Chapter of the Royal Australian Institute of Architects "Award for civic design" for the TAFE Halls of Residence, Kelvin Grove.

== Exhibitions ==
- 1959 – Australian Pavilion, Lausanne Fair
- 1962 – Qantas Exhibition of Australian Architecture, London
- 1967 – Australian Pavilion, Expo 67, Montreal
- 1970 – Australian Pavilion, Expo 70, Osaka
- 1983 – Old Continent New Buildings, Australia Council Exhibition

== Positions held and memberships ==
- 1960–74 – Executive Member, Council for the Queensland Art Gallery Society
- 1964 – Part-time lecturer in fifth year design, Architecture department, Queensland University
- 1965 – Executive Member, Contemporary Art Society of Australia
- 1966–70 – Council Member, Contemporary Art Society of Australia
- 1966–70 – Council Member, Queensland Chapter of the Royal Australian Institute of Architects
- 1969 – Member, Faculty Board of Architecture, University of Queensland
- 1976–84 – Lecturer, Queensland Institute of Technology
- 1982 – Life Fellow of the Royal Australian Institute of Architects

== See also ==
- List of buildings designed by architect John Dalton
