= University of the Year =

University of the Year may refer to:

== Australia ==
- Australian University of the Year, a discontinued annual award given by the Australian Good Universities Guide

== Ireland and United Kingdom ==
- Times Higher Education University of the Year, an annual award given by Times Higher Education

== United Kingdom ==
- Sunday Times University of the Year, an annual award given by The Times and The Sunday Times
