= MINERVA-Australis =

MINERVA-Australis is a dedicated exoplanet observatory, operated by the University of Southern Queensland, in Queensland, Australia. The facility is located at USQ's Mount Kent Observatory, and saw first light in quarter two 2018. Commissioning of the telescope array and spectrograph was completed in mid-2019, and the facility was officially launched on 23 July 2019.

Minerva Australis follows the innovative model first deployed in the northern hemisphere's Miniature Exoplanet Radial Velocity Array (MINERVA) a dedicated northern hemisphere exoplanet observatory located at the Fred Lawrence Whipple Observatory, Mt. Hopkins, Arizona USA. Currently, MINERVA-Australis continues to collect data for southern hemisphere ground-based follow-up and characterisation of exoplanets discovered by NASA's Transiting Exoplanet Survey Satellite (TESS), which was launched in April 2018, a year before Minerva Australis' first light.

The project's principal investigator is USQ astronomer Rob Wittenmyer, who leads a consortium of partners from institutions across the world (UNSW Australia; Nanjing University; University of California, Riverside; MIT; George Mason University; University of Louisville; University of Texas at Austin; University of Florida).

== Science objectives ==
The primary mission of MINERVA-Australis is to support observations carried out by the NASA TESS spacecraft, providing dedicated follow-up and characterisation of newly discovered exoplanets. The facility also pursues targets of opportunity, extends the baseline of the Anglo-Australian Planet Search program, and collects time-series data on request from researchers at partner institutions and collaborative programs . MINERVA-Australis obtains radial velocity observations with a precision approaching 1 meter/second, enabling direct determination of the masses of planet candidates discovered by the TESS spacecraft.

In addition to its core design utilizing high resolution spectroscopy, MINERVA-Australis also offers fast-cadence multispectral photometric observations with useful precison of 1 part per thousand for stars as faint as 12th magnitude. Transit light curve analysis yields the orbital period, the spatial size of the orbit, and the radius of the planet compared to the host star. Together with the radial velocity and spectroscopy during the transit, the data reveal mass of the planet and the inclination of the orbit to the planet's line of sight.

By 2026, Observations made by the MINERVA-Australis array have contributed to the discovery of more than 40 exoplanets through collaboration with researchers at institutions across the globe.

== The facility ==
MINERVA-Australis currently uses four PlaneWave 0.7 meter telescopes with corrected Dall-Kirkham (CDK) optics and an ASA 0.8 meter telescope with all-reflecting Ritchie-Chretien optics. The CDK telescopes have two ports, allowing each to be used for either spectroscopic or photometric observations simultaneously on the same target. The array of telescopes, each in its own automated clam-shell Astro Haven

dome, are on a semi-circle of pads around the main observatory building. Mount Kent Observatory also hosts other telescopes independent of the Minerva Australis array.

The telescopes are connected by optical fibre to a stabilised, R = 75,000 echelle spectrograph, covering the wavelengths 480 - 630nm, designed by KiwiStar Optics. The spectrograph uses simultaneous calibration in a separate fibre. Prior to 2020, the simultaneous calibration was provided by a Thorium-Argon lamp. Because of the wavelength range and the very low scattered light the simultaneous calibration source is now supplied by a Tungsten slit-flat lamp backlighting an iodine cell. This is a different approach to the normal iodine cell method that passes the starlight through a reference cell.

Photometric work uses back-illuminated CMOS sensors in cameras such as the ASI6200 , offering an effective field of view greater than 20 arcminutes, exposure times from milliseconds to minutes, low noise and wide dynamic range. With state of the art analysis, relative flux changes of 1 part per thousand are achievable. This precision enables detecting transiting Earth-size planets orbing stars that have a stable flux over the duration of the transit event.

== See also ==
- List of telescopes of Australia
