= Moore Observatory =

Observatory in Kentucky, US

- Organization: University of Louisville
- Location: Oldham County, Kentucky
- Coordinates: 38°20′40″N 85°31′44″W
- Altitude: 230 meters (750 ft)
- Established: 1978
- Website: Moore Observatory

Telescopes
- unnamed telescope: 0.6 m reflector
- unnamed telescope: 0.5 m reflector

Moore Observatory is an astronomical observatory owned and operated by University of Louisville (U of L). It is located on the Horner Wildlife Refuge in Oldham County, Kentucky (USA) approximately 20 kilometers (12 mi) northeast of Louisville. It opened in 1978, and was dedicated to Walter Lee Moore, a Professor of Mathematics at U of L from 1929 to 1967.

Moore Observatory is a research and advanced teaching facility of the University of Louisville. The observatory operates two research telescopes at the site, and a companion telescope at Mount Kent near Toowoomba, Australia. The observatory is located on the 200 acres (0.81 km^{2}) Horner Wildlife Refuge. The Horner Family donated this land to the U of L in the early 1960s and another 1,000 acres (4.0 km^{2}) of the original farm surrounds the preserve.

== Telescopes ==
- A 0.6 m (24 in) Ritchey–Chrétien telescope manufactured by RC Optical Systems was installed in August 2006. It is currently used to measure transiting exoplanets. Other research performed with the telescope includes observing the physical process of nebula.
- A 0.5 m (20 in) Ritchey–Chrétien telescope manufactured by RC Optical Systems on an altitude-azimuth mount was added in 2019. It is primarily used for low Earth orbit (LEO) satellite observations, for near Earth object (NEO) characterization.
- A 0.7 m (28 in) modified Dall–Kirkham telescope built by Planewave Instruments is at Mount Kent Observatory in Queensland, Australia.
- Two identical 0.5 m (20 in) modified Dall–Kirkham telescopes at Moore Observatory and at Mount Kent are collaboratively operated by U of L and the University of Southern Queensland (USQ). They were built by Planewave Instruments and installed in 2006. They are used for education, public astronomy outreach, and target of opportunity research. The telescopes are interfaced to Internet2, and are operated remotely by students from Kentucky public schools, undergraduate and graduate students at U of L, and students at USQ. This arrangement allows students to study the southern night sky during the day and the Australian students to study the northern night sky during their day.

== See also ==
- Morgan–Monroe Observatory
- List of astronomical observatories
