= Sarah May Low =

Beauty queen, singer, dancer, actress, and astrologer

- Born: 19 February 1988 (age 38)
- Education: Diploma in Mass Communication, B.A in Mass Communication (Journalism & Public Relations), M.A in Performing Arts (Dance), PhD in Human Communications
- Alma mater: INTI International University, University of Southern Queensland, University of Malaya, Universiti Putra Malaysia.
- Occupations: Beauty queen, singer, dancer, actress, & astrologer.
- Known for: Tarot Reading & Astrology
- Website: www.sarahmaylow.com

Sarah May Low (born February 19, 1988 ) also known as Sarah Low May Poh; (Chinese: 刘美宝; pinyin: LiúMěiBǎo) is a Malaysian beauty queen, singer, dancer, actress, and astrologer.

Sarah participated in several beauty pageants, including Miss World Malaysia 2009 and Miss Malaysia Earth 2013, where she earned the title of Miss Malaysia Earth Energetic. She is widely recognized as a Tarot Reader and Astrologer in Malaysia, having been featured in multiple media outlets.

== Early life and education ==
Sarah was born in Kuala Lumpur, Malaysia. As a child, she trained as a ballerina and Latin dancer, studying the Royal Academy of Dance (RAD) style from the age of four.

Sarah pursued higher education at INTI International University, earning a Diploma in Mass Communication. She obtained a Bachelor's degree in Mass Communications (Journalism & Public Relations) from the University of Southern Queensland, a Master's degree in Performing Arts (Dance) from the University of Malaya, and a PhD in Human Communications from Universiti Putra Malaysia.

== Career ==
Sarah has had a multifaceted career spanning media, performing arts, and spiritual practice. After experiencing health issues and personal challenges, she transitioned to spiritual work, founding the Sarah May Low Tarot Academy. She is known for her work in Tarot reading, astrology, and spiritual guidance.

In addition to her spiritual practice, Sarah has been involved in performing arts as a singer, dancer, and actress featuring in multiple arts platforms, TV shows and films. She featured in several beauty pageants, including Miss World Malaysia 2009 and Miss Malaysia Earth 2013, where she earned the title of Miss Malaysia Earth Energetic.

== Community service ==
Sarah is an advocate for mental health and community welfare. She has worked with various organizations to support underprivileged communities and has been involved in mental health awareness campaigns.

== Performance arts credits ==
=== Acting/TV appearance ===
Year	Title	Role
2006	Telemovie Mencari Nur sa’thani	Sharmine
2006	Anlene Documentary HidupPenuh Makna-TV3	Iris Loo
2007	Short Film It's Now or Never	Maggie
2007	Short Film Web of Lies	Rita
2007	Short Film It's Now or Never	Maggie
2007	Short Film It's Now or Never	Maggie

=== Dance ===
Year	Title	Role
2008	Perodua Corporate Identity Launch-The beginning of a new era Opening Performance	Dancer
2009	Malaysian Dance Carnival Performance-Lyrical Jazz	Dancer
2012	Kimarie Dance Show – Malaysia Beauty Fair with Cecilia Yong, Winner of So You Think You Can Dance Season 2	Dancer
2013	Moet &Chandon The Great Gatsby" Burlesque Dance Performance	Dancer
2013	Moet Imperial Night at Sultan Lounge, Mandarin Oriental	Dancer

=== Singer ===
Year	Title	Role
2007	Singing Performance for IBM	Singer
2007	Singing Performance for Standard Chartered Bank	Singer
2008	Singing performance for Dutch Lady	Singer
2010	Prudential National Annual Award	Singer
2010	Websense (AP.com) Game On performance	Singer
2012	SHARP (electronics) Big is Awesome	Singer
2015	Singing performance at Miss KL Earth 2015 Grand Finals	Singer
