= John Dalton's Residential Architecture =

John Dalton's (FRAIA) architectural career was chiefly distinguished by his extensive practice in domestic architecture, concentrated in the Western suburbs of Brisbane, Queensland, Australia. In a career that spanned four decades (including a phase of semi-retired practice from 1979 to 1987), and realised upwards of 80 residences.

Throughout his distinguished career, Dalton gained consistent peer recognition through publication, and was frequently the recipient of industry awards, for his work designing and promoting climatically responsive modern homes. His anecdotal ‘formula’ for this -"Sun + Life + Useful Form = Architectural magic." This central theme resonated throughout the entirety of Dalton's works. It is exemplified by his poetic response to local conditions; through the extension of indoor and outdoor spaces and the stylised elaboration of detail at the edges of buildings.

Over an extensive body of domestic architecture, Dalton's repetition of formal, material, compositional and structural gestures – established somewhat of distinct ‘Dalton palette.’ Aside from this, what is identifiable in all of Dalton's houses, is the way in which Dalton orchestrates the subtropical climate: exploiting the ‘magic of the sun and shadow’ to dispense comfort and happiness; in the service of a regional notion of contemporary Queensland architecture.

The only (known) survey to consider a significant body of Dalton's residential architecture, Noel Robinson's 1976 Thesis (for his Bachelor of Architecture at the University of Queensland) "Dalton Houses 1956–1975: an exemplar for Brisbane's domestic architects", categorised the residences designed by Dalton between 1956 and 1975 according to four visually distinct (and roughly chronological) stages. Additionally, a fifth distinct stage in his architectural practice occurred post-dated these, and carried on through his semi-retirement from practice in 1979, to his distinctive final projects in the mid-to-late 1980s.

== Early career ==
=== Anonymous Houses (1956–1961) ===
Dalton House
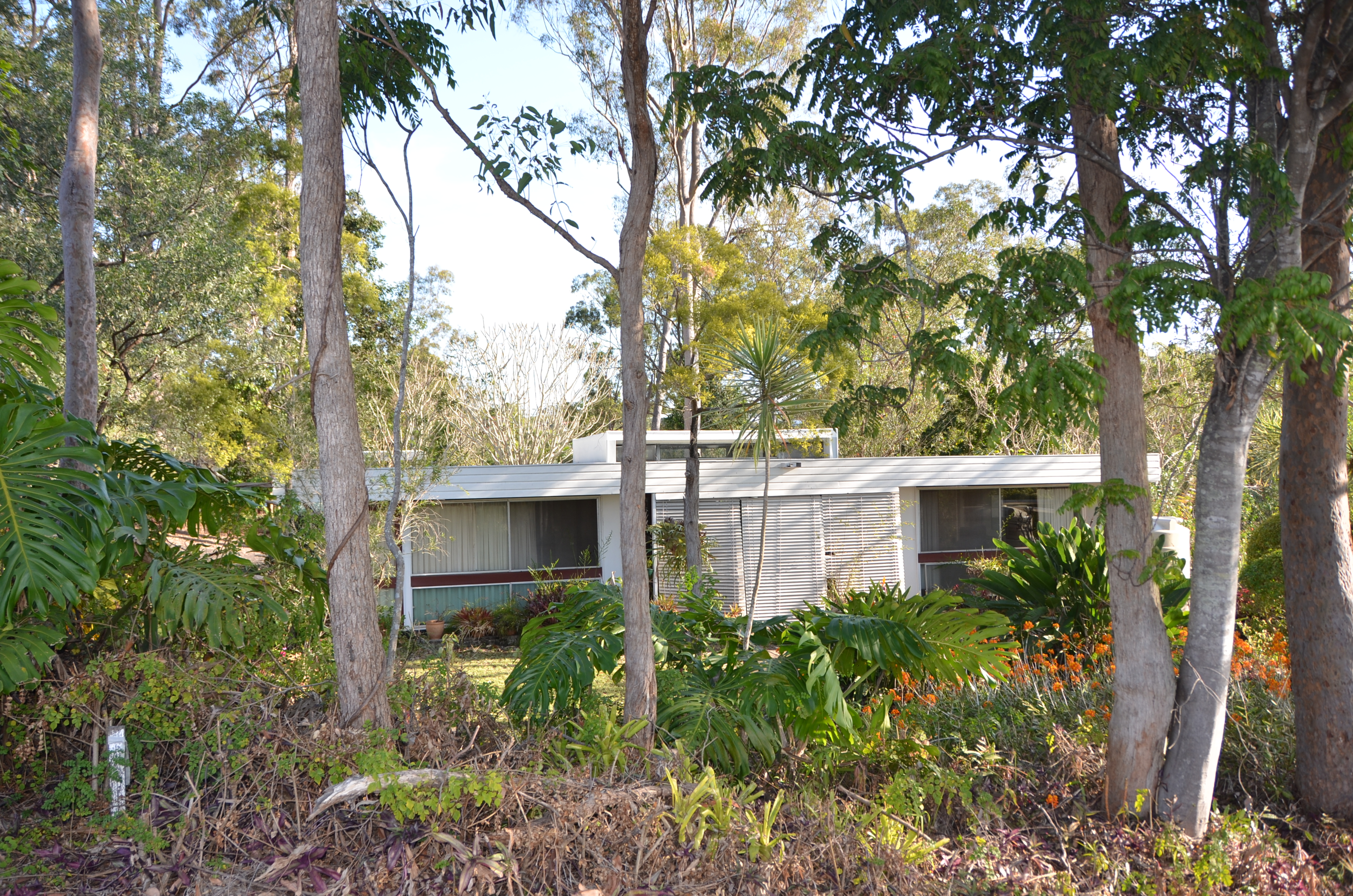
- Northern elevation of Dalton House
- Interactive map of the Dalton House area

General information
- Type: Residence
- Location: Fig Tree Pocket, Queensland, Australia
- Coordinates: 27.523266°S 152.946922°E
- Completed: 1962
- Client: John Dalton
- Owner: Sheila Dalton (née Harvey)

Design and construction
- Architect: John Dalton
- Awards: "Ten Best Houses" (1959–1960) in Architecture & Arts

The first, considered Dalton's ‘Anonymous Houses’, encompassed the design of a series of modest homes in Brisbane's (then) semi-rural Western suburbs between 1956 and 1961. These ‘anonymous’ houses were distinguished by their ‘unobtrusive simplicity’, in lieu of any strong ‘stylistic’ presence. These early houses designed by Dalton retain visual similarities with the architects under whom John Dalton had worked, most notably, the renowned practice of Eddie Hayes & Cam Scott. This was most evident in the specification of construction and finishes in these early houses. Whilst relatively non-specific, the form of these houses often emphasised the horizontality of the building, often with continuous runs of windows/glazed sliding walls, and expressed soffit beams and lines of eaves.

The earliest exemplar of Dalton's ‘anonymous’ homes architecture can be seen in the house the architect designed for himself and his first wife Sheila in 1959 (completed 1960) at Fig Tree Pocket Rd, Fig Tree Pocket, Brisbane. The house was constructed around the time that Dalton established his own architectural practice and strongly communicates Dalton's faith in the "principles of climate design" as a basis for an expressive rational architecture.

Oriented north-east, as is optimal for the Brisbane climate, Dalton provided privacy from the busy passing traffic by setting the house down and back from the road, and strategically locating screening elements. Dalton's concern for adequate ventilation is evident throughout the design. The floor plan provides cooling North-east breezes for the majority of the rooms in the house, which is helped by a central kitchen that avoids the need for corridors. A ventilated lantern above the kitchen allows hot air to escape, while under-floor vents and grilles at the junction of the ceiling and eaves promote the constant cooling movement of through the house. A rooftop sprinkler system assists in keeping the house cool throughout warm summers.

Key materials favoured by Dalton throughout his career are employed here:

- Auto-claved (A.C) asbestos cement sheeting
- Frameless sliding plate glass windows
- Ribbed, galvanised steel decking (roof)
- Reflective aluminum foil insulation – used additionally to resist the heat of the Summer sun on the Eastern and Western walls.

As Dalton identified in his writings on the ‘pragmatic poetry’ of the domestic Queensland home, his careful orchestration of a localised interpretation of the ‘modern pavilion’ borrowed from the climatic strategies of vernacular Queensland houses. Pergolas and lattice screening filter light and shade glass, whilst providing comfortable shaded outdoor zones. Internally, movable walls allow the internal space to be customised according to seasonal or diurnal comfort needs.

The Dalton House was a key point in the emergence of his distinguished architectural practice. The house was widely published, including its selection in ‘The ten best houses for 1959-6’ by The Australian Journal of Architecture and Arts. It is now recognised, amongst many, by the RAIA as work of ‘Nationally Significant 20th Century Architecture.

Further examples of Dalton's "Anonymous Houses" include:

- Spinks House, Quentin St, Chapel Hill
- Young House, Mount Gravatt

=== Linear Houses (1961–1965) ===
Leverington House
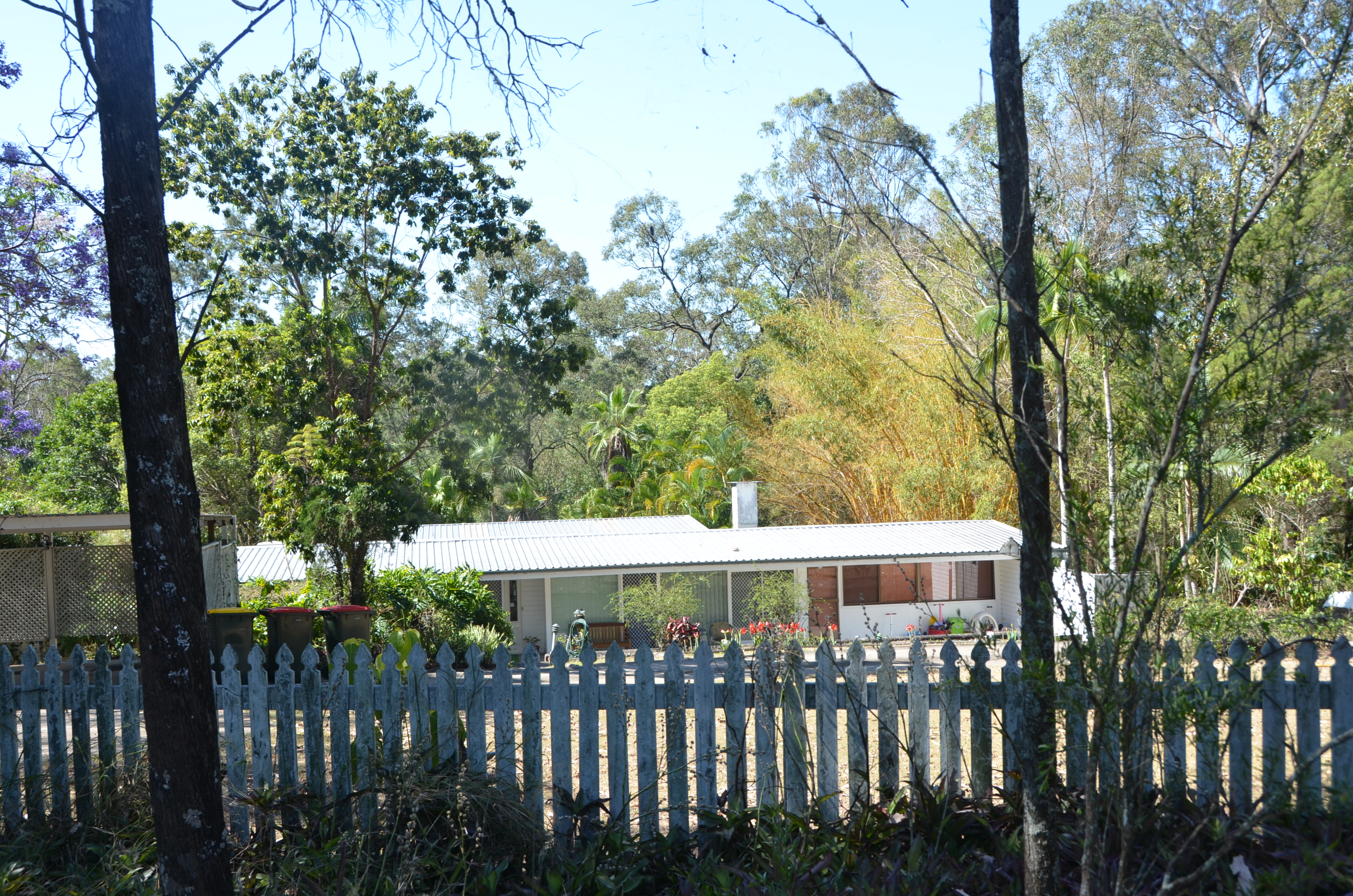
- Long elevation of Leverington House
- Interactive map of the Leverington House area

General information
- Type: Residence
- Location: Kenmore, Queensland, Australia
- Coordinates: 27.521231°S 152.956106°E
- Completed: 1962
- Client: Leverington Family

Design and construction
- Architect: John Dalton
- Awards: "Ten Best Houses & Buildings" (1961–1962) Architecture & Arts; RAIA QLD Commendation (1962)

The ‘Linear Houses’ of the second phase of his early career, are characterised as a prevailing incidence of linear plans and a strong horizontal emphasis’ due to their ‘long, low expression.’

The Leverington House, at Kenmore Rd, Kenmore, is an exemplar of this ‘linear’ house style designed by John Dalton in the first half of the 1960s. A residence for the Leverington family, it was constructed in 1962.

The regularity of the linear plan is expressed in the external form taken of the house, and is exaggerated by Dalton's siting of the house, back and below the ridge of the road level. Hallmark features used commonly throughout Dalton's houses emerge during this period, included the Dalton fireplace and feature chimney. The expression of beams that form the heads windows and external doors is another key gesture here that Dalton repeated throughout his career.

As was the case in the architect's own house, Dalton explored the potential teaming up of floor plan and definitively low-pitched roof forms to provide adequate ventilation and luminosity for optimal comfort.

The Leverington house features a long-unbroken roof line, with large glass areas protected by a shaded roof and horizontal sun-control louvres. The thin plan is supplement by a breezeway for through-ventilation. The large expanses of Dalton's hallmark sliding glass windows minimise the distinction between indoors and outdoors.

The house featured in The Australian Journal of Architecture and Arts’ 10 Best Buildings in Australia, November 1962, and was awarded an RAIA Queensland Chapter Commendation for House of the Year in 1963.

Further examples of Dalton's Linear Houses include:

- Swan residence, Lois St, Kenmore
- Belligoi House, Munro St, Indooroopilly
- Barrett House, Kingussie St, Kenmore

== Mid-Late Career ==
=== Emphasis on Roof Form (1965–1969) ===
Graham House
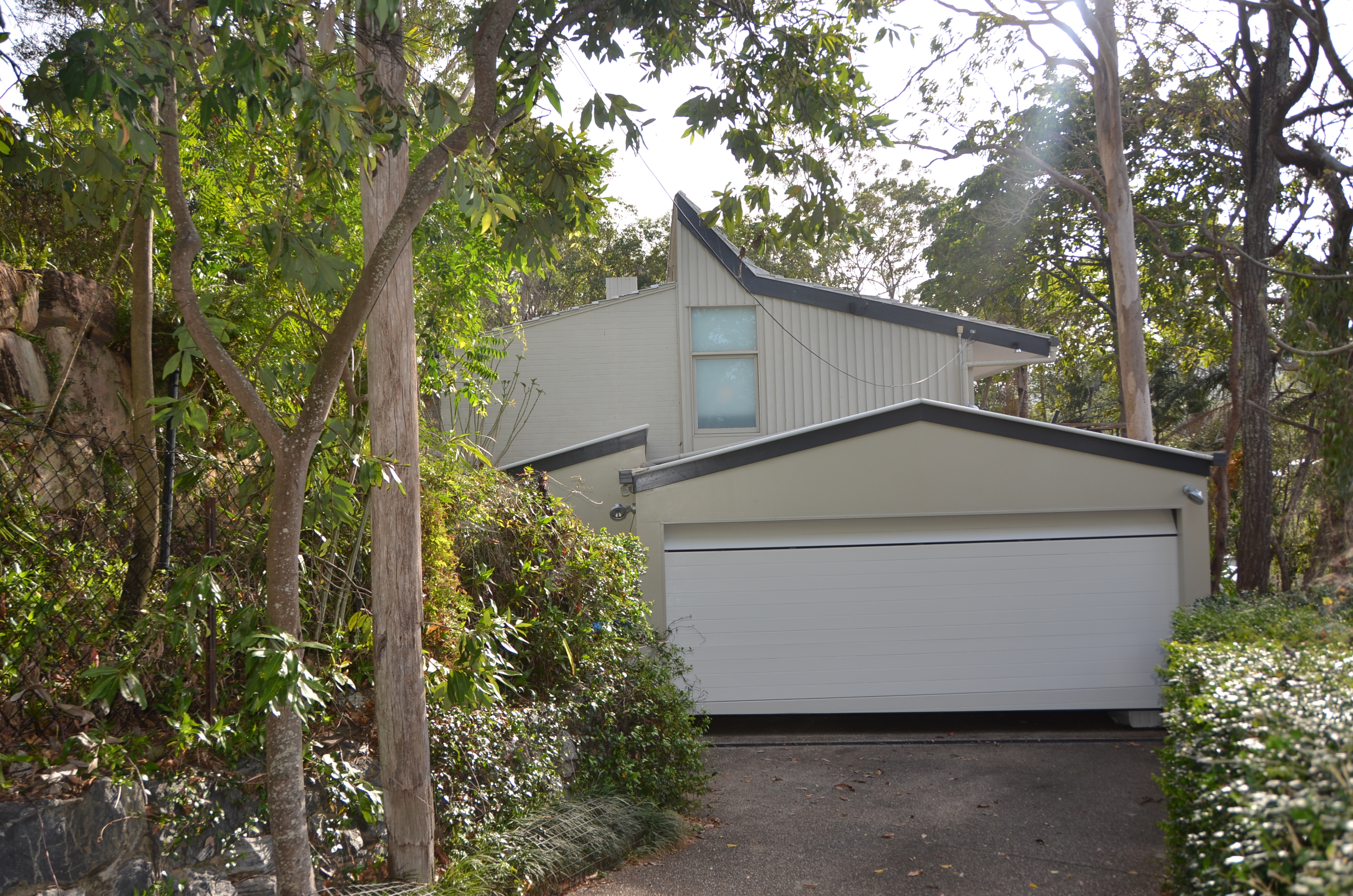
- Graham House with additions and alterations
- Interactive map of the Graham House area

General information
- Type: Residence
- Location: Taringa, Queensland, Australia
- Coordinates: 27.487954°S 152.974669°E
- Completed: 1966
- Client: R. Graham

Design and construction
- Architect: John Dalton
- Awards: RAIA QLD House of the Year (1967)

Dalton's architectural practice entered a third period in the mid-to-late 1960s, distinguished by a marked shift away from horizontal expression and towards an ‘Emphasis on Roof Form’. This shift was made even more apparent by a change in Dalton's palette of material and detail finishes. Stained timber became a characteristic feature, and bagged white-painted brick gained greater usage, as the house becomes a ‘timber box resting on brick buttresses.’ The biggest move was in the internal volume of the houses, that now were afforded richer spatial experiences by the emphasis on the design of the roof form. This was a significant jump from the modest consistency of volumes and economical spans of his earlier houses. This phase consequently was also characterised by the design of heavier external forms supporting these more expressive profiles.

One of the most widely recognised & awarded of Dalton's houses, the Graham House, designed in 1966 for Mr R. Graham, on a steeply sloping site at Gower St, Taringa. is a key example of this phase of Dalton's residential architecture. Designed with a limited budget with provision for later expansion, the house is carefully integrated into the difficult slope. The house appears to be a lightly perched, timber-framed volume, resting on the characteristic brick buttresses, and incorporating a generous fly-screened verandah for shaded summer living lightly in a raised timber frame. The roof form of the Graham house acts both a design generator, and climatic feature, with the incorporation of ventilated extracts along the roof ridge. The expression of the timber structure enabling the verticality of the crippled skillion roof-form, was a key feature throughout this period. The strengthened material language developed here was retained by Dalton to varying degrees for the rest of his career, these being:

- White-painted common bagged brickwork
- Sawn Queensland Box hardwood weatherboards, creosote stained
- White concrete roofing tiles, sliding frameless glass windows, plasterboard
- Oiled weatherboard wall and ceiling linings

Dalton's design for the Graham House provided a deft expression of a certain ‘contemporary vernacular: whilst providing an efficient solution to comfortable habitation in the subtropical Queensland climate.

=== Fragmented Houses (1969–1975) ===
Dunlop House
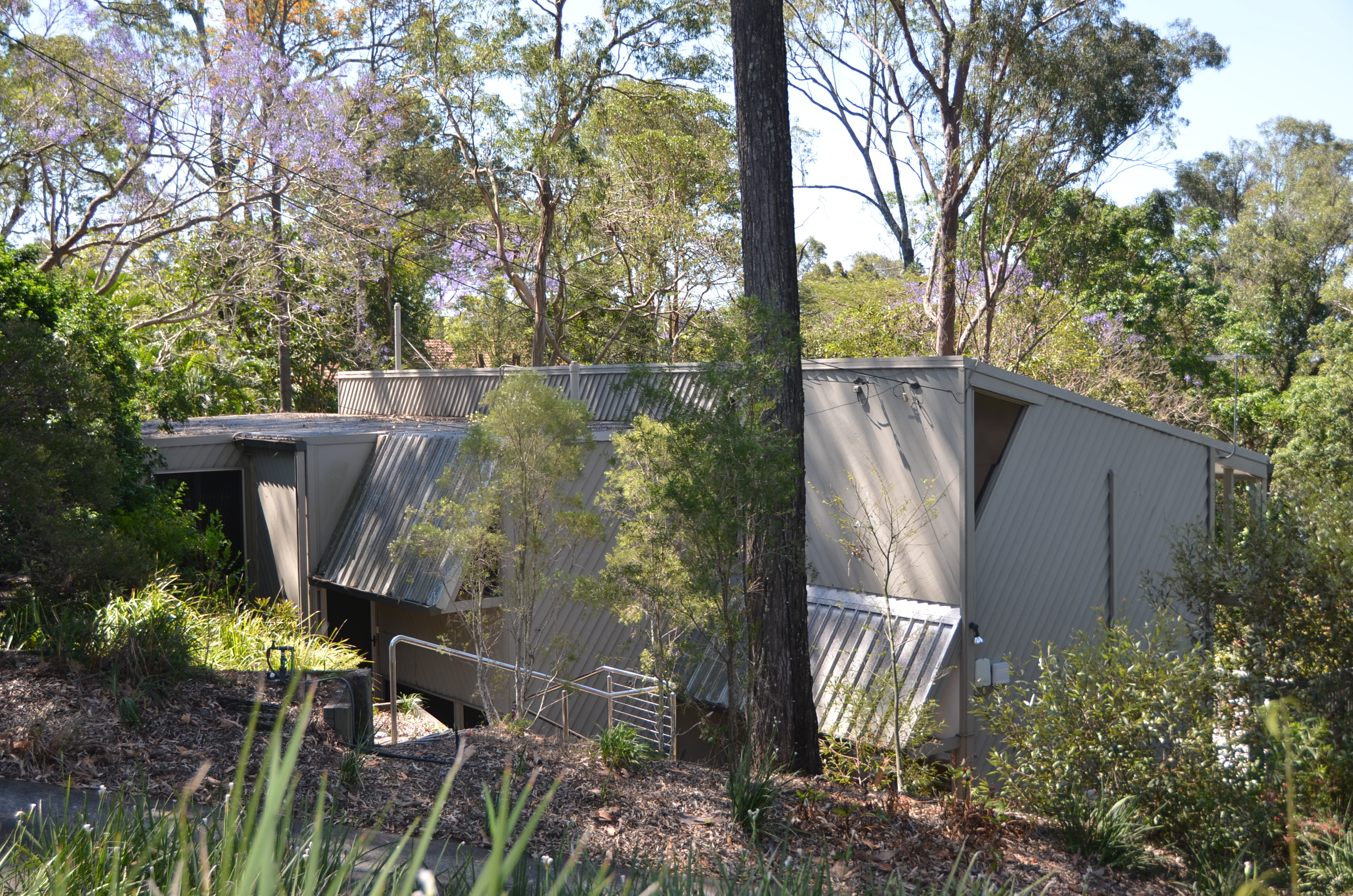
- External view of Dunlop House
- Interactive map of the Dunlop House area

General information
- Type: Residence
- Location: Fig Tree Pocket, Queensland, Australia
- Coordinates: 27.516039°S 152.965199°E
- Completed: 1975
- Client: Dunlop Family

Design and construction
- Architect: John Dalton

The ‘Fragmented Houses’ of this fourth phase of Dalton's residential architecture combine elements from each of the preceding periods. From the late 1960s to the mid-1970s Dalton's houses became increasingly complex in response to a shift in the scale and economy of his residential commissions. During this time Dalton designed a series of larger houses in prestige suburbs, often on sites with significant frontages to the Brisbane River. According to Noel Robinson, these homes exhibit the characteristic "manipulation of roof pitches to vary the internal volumes, and Dalton’s efficient rectangular planning of earlier periods was replaced by rambling, non-linear grouping of volumes to fulfil the expanded briefs of wealthy clients.

These houses maintained the climatic techniques and material language of Dalton’s earlier phases, including the loose resemblance to vernacular forms and the use of batten screens and crippled roofs." In this period, to incorporate the need for multi-storey volumes, Dalton employed greater roof pitches and high level ventilation and windows for natural light. In order to maintain his stringent responsiveness to climatic comfort, the rambling floor plans are punctuated by generous outdoor living areas and breezeways. Throughout this mature phase of his work, Dalton experimented with expressive, high-level openings, diagonal weatherboarding – to emphasise the play of light and shadow – and clever deployment of multi-level volumes.

Key examples from this period include:

- Dunlop House, 1975, Jesmond Road, Fig Tree Pocket
- Musgrave House, 1973, Roseberry Tce, Chelmer
- Peden House, 1975, Glenhurst Rd, Pinjarra Hills

== Later career ==
=== Queensland Houses (1975–1987) ===
Hendry House
- Interactive map of the Hendry House area
- Alternative names: Burrandool House

General information
- Type: Residence
- Location: Mount Coot-tha, Queensland, Australia
- Coordinates: 27.487954°S 152.970582°E
- Completed: 1986
- Client: Hendry Family

Design and construction
- Architect: John Dalton

From 1975 to his final architectural works in 1987, Dalton's residential architecture shifted gears towards a quieter stylistic expression. Many of the forms and details to be found in Dalton's later works reflect both Dalton's close collaboration with many of his clients and his deep belief in the value of carrying forth vernacular responses to living in the Queensland climate. His residential architecture is imbued with the time he spent living in regional Western Queensland.

The sprawling residence designed for the Hendry family, at the base of Mount Coot-tha (in the inner-western Brisbane suburb of Bardon), initially appears to owe little to the earlier phases of Dalton residential architecture. In what would be one of Dalton's final architectural commissions ‘climatic response’ is seen to take prevalence over the perceived rigour of his earlier formal expression. An abundance of steeply pitched roofs with expressed timber framing promote nostalgia for the construction of rural homestead. This shift away from the pursuit of a climatically responsive contemporary vernacular, and towards a reinterpretation of vernacular forms was exemplified by his ‘sensitive restoration and reuse project for a Lambtail cottage, a 1901 worker's cottage in Allora, Western Queensland, which gained Dalton a citation in the Restoration/Renovation/Historical Preservation Section of the 1981 RAIA Queensland Chapter Awards.

Further Examples from this period include:

- Byth Residence, 1987, Meiers Rd, Indooroopilly
