= TAFE Hall of Residence, Kelvin Grove =

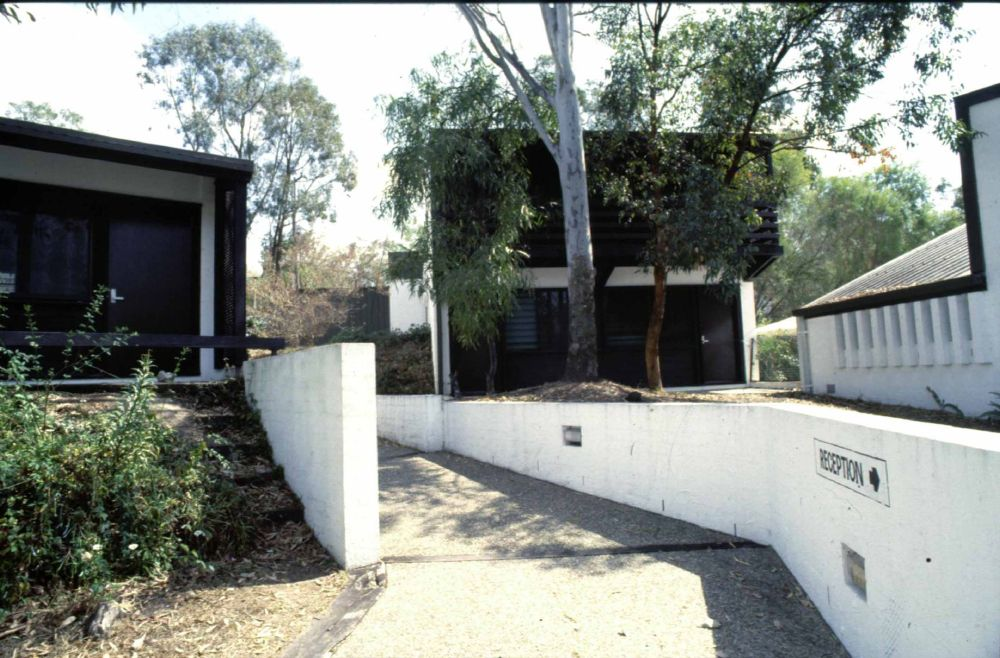
- TAFE Hall of Residence, Kelvin Grove

- Location within Queensland Location within Australia
- 27.4525°S 153.0152°E
- Location: 95–107 Musk Avenue, Kelvin Grove, City of Brisbane, Queensland, Australia

History
- Built: 1976–1978

Site notes
- Architect: John Dalton

Queensland Heritage Register
- Official name: Student Residences, QUT Kelvin Grove Campus, Hall of Residence, TAFE Queensland
- Type: state heritage (built, landscape)
- Designated: 25 February 2004
- Reference no.: 602235
- Significant period: 1976–78 (fabric, historical)
- Significant components: pathway/walkway, residential accommodation – quarters, other – social/community: component, courtyard

TAFE Hall of Residence is a heritage-listed disused residential college at 95–107 Musk Avenue, Kelvin Grove, City of Brisbane, Queensland, Australia. It was designed by John Dalton and built from 1976 to 1978. It was added to the Queensland Heritage Register on 25 February 2004.

== History ==
A Queensland Cabinet decision of May 1973 established a policy of providing Halls of Residence for young people who were obliged to live away from home to attend classes. The Hall of Residence at Kelvin Grove were designed for short-term accommodation for country students undertaking Technical and further education (TAFE) block release apprenticeship courses (of 6–7 weeks duration) which were not available regionally.

A site at Chelmer was originally proposed but after it was inundated in the 1974 Brisbane flood an alternative site at Kelvin Grove (originally part of Gona Barracks) was selected. This land had been excised from the Barracks site in the early 1970s when a right-of-way was created for a proposed North-Western freeway. The bulk of the Barracks site was on the western side of the proposed freeway, fronting Kelvin Grove Road. Land on the eastern side of the freeway alignment, with frontages to Victoria Park Road on either side of Blamey Street, was gazetted as a Reserve for a Technical College. The land on the northern side of Blamey Street was intended as the site for a new Technical Correspondence School. The proposed freeway did not go ahead after the Commonwealth government withdrew funds for urban freeways, and by mid-1975 that land on the southern side of Blamey Street was selected for the first Brisbane Hall of Residence.

Against a background of criticism by the Australian Government of the standard of recent Brisbane buildings for TAFE the Brisbane architect, John Dalton, was commissioned to design the hall of residence in mid-1975. The building was to be staged with accommodation in Stage 1 for 120 students, 6 tutors and a warden and with provision for a future Stage 2 for a further 120 students and another 6 tutors. The design and documentation phases were accelerated so that construction would commence before a 30 June 1976 funding deadline.

An initial design based on higher densities with self-contained groups of four students with kitchenette and bath room was revised in October 1975 to one of more domestic scale with a centralised dining/common room, to bring the project within a cost limit of $10,000 per student. The successful tender for $1,254,561 (slightly over budget) was received from Hornick Constructions and the completed complex was handed over on 13 December 1978. The building won awards from the Royal Australian Institute of Architects (RAIA) for meritorious architecture in 1979 and for civic design in 1982.

The design of the accommodation at the former Hall of Residence was a departure from earlier halls of residence and illustrates the changing ideological and utilitarian needs of students at the time as well as the particular needs of short term occupants. There was a global shift that began in the 1960s in response to changing student needs brought about by sweeping social change, growing student numbers and economic constraints. Accommodation which was institutional and formal, where student movements could be more easily monitored and regulated was being replaced with that which provided students with more independence and a more informal living environment.

This departure in approach to student accommodation is clearly demonstrated in the design of the Hall of Residence at Kelvin Grove through the scale and informal clustering of buildings and entwining paths which, on the steep topography, provide a measure of privacy without fully divorcing the activities in the dwellings from passing pedestrians, thus maintaining a sense of community.

The project was commissioned by the Queensland Department of Public Works on behalf of the Education Department. Within the Queensland Department of Public Works the project was overseen by the Ukrainian-born architect Peter Prystupa (1920–1989) who trained in Vienna during and after World War II. In 1949 he emigrated to Queensland where he upgraded his European training to meet local practice requirements at the University of Queensland, joining the Works Department in 1953. In the 1970s Prystupa was responsible for commissioning architects with established reputations for good design, including John Dalton, Robin Gibson, James Birrell and Darvall Miller. Prystupa is said to have countered the opposition of the conservative (Country Party) Queensland Government of that time, to the Kelvin Grove project by emphasising that the housing was primarily intended for country students.

In 1987, the responsibility for Technical and Further Education was transferred from the Department of Education to the Department of Employment, Vocational Education and Training. In the 1990s, approaches were made by the Queensland University of Technology to purchase the complex. These were initially rejected but in September 1993, the complex was transferred for $4 million -considerably less than the replacement cost.

In the original scheme, five clusters of residential units were constructed around the community building. In 2002, three residential clusters were demolished for the development of the Kelvin Grove Urban Village. In 2004, the remains of the Hall of Residence - the two clusters facing Musk Avenue and the Community Services Building - was registered under the Queensland Heritage Register.

As at 2014, the student residence complex is not in active use, occasionally used by the university for storage or temporary offices.

== The architect ==
John Dalton (1927—2007) was born in Leeds, Yorkshire, England and came to Queensland in 1950. While training at the Central Technical College and the University of Queensland, he was employed in the offices of Theo Thynne and Hayes and Scott. Soon after he graduated in 1956 with a Diploma of Architecture he commenced private practice and quickly established a reputation for high quality design:

He won a competition for a plywood display house in 1956, and for a project house in 1962. His work was exhibited in the Australian Pavilion at Lausanne Fair in 1959; in the Qantas Exhibition of Australian Architecture in London in 1962; and in the Australian pavilions at Expos in Montreal 1967 and Osaka in 1970, and in the Australia Council's exhibition Old Continent New Buildings in 1983; He won awards from the magazine Architecture and Arts for buildings in the ten best projects in 1959–60, 1960–61 and 1962. He won awards from the RAIA in 1962, 1964, 1967, 1972, 1975, 1976, 1977, 1978, 1979, 1981, 1982

He became well known through his domestic work which included houses he designed for himself in 1952 and 1960. Through the 1960s his reputation was further enhanced by his success in the Institute of Architect's awards programs, through his innovation in climatic design, through writing and publication of his work and through teaching. His early advocacy for reintroduction of vernacular elements such as verandahs, high-set houses, roof ventilation and climatic design generally was notable and influential and led to international exhibition of his work in Australian pavilions at Expositions in Montreal and Osaka.

Dalton's success in the 1960s was a prelude for larger public and award-winning commissions in the 1970s which included:

- The Vice-Chancellor's Residence at the University of Queensland commissioned for Zelman Cowen (demolished 2000)
- the Bardon Professional Development Centre (sold by Education Department and subsequently remodelled)
- the Hall of Residence, Kelvin Grove
- the Student Union building for Griffith University
- the Arts, Crafts and Music Building, Darling Downs Institute of Advanced Education

Of these works, the Hall of Residence, Kelvin Grove is the only extant project which has a residential component.

Early in the 1980s, Dalton largely closed down his Brisbane practice and moved to Allora.

Dalton's work has international recognition, is widely published and is included in key texts on the history of architecture, including:

- Banister Fletcher, "A History of Architecture"
- J.M. Freeland, "Architecture in Australia: A History"
- Richard Apperly, et al. "A Pictorial Guide to Identifying Australian Architecture"

== Description ==
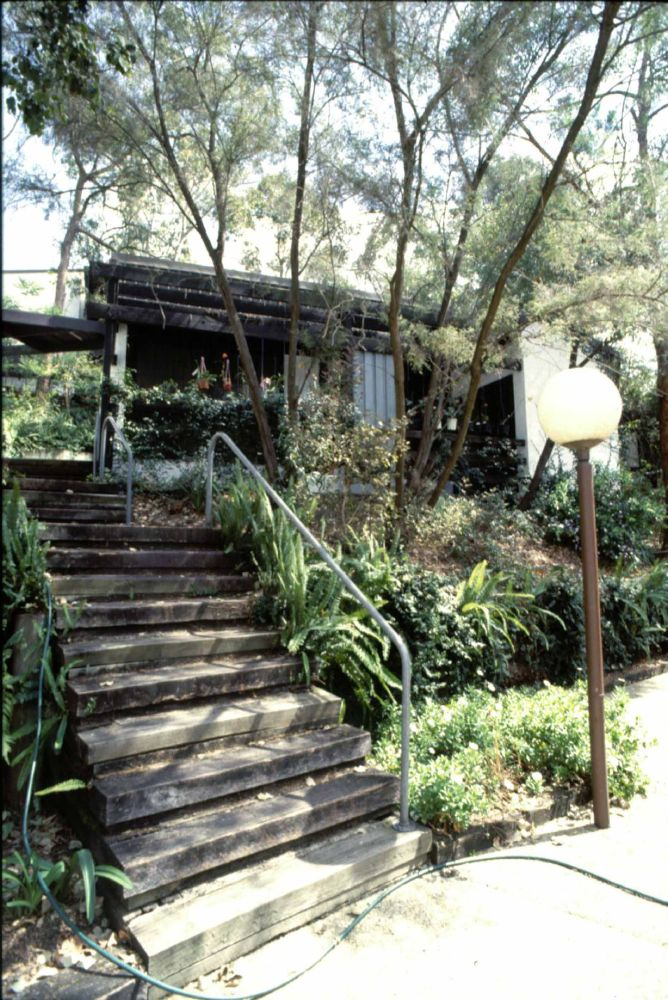
Hall of Residence

Unlike earlier halls of residence, the accommodation at Kelvin Grove is provided in small domestic-scaled buildings. These are dispersed on the steeply sloping southern sides of a southward sloping valley at the corner of Blamey Street and Victoria Park Road, Kelvin Grove. The accommodation units with south-east to north-east orientation are clustered in two groups together with accommodation for tutors and laundry facilities. These groups are arranged informally around the community services building which is a focus of the complex. This central core is sited at the top of the complex which steps to suit the topography and is interconnected with the accommodation by pathways.

The overall impression is of a hillside village with a high degree of unity resulting from the repetitive use of pitched metal deck roofs, walls of white painted bagged cavity brick masonry and timber elements – pergolas, balustrades and lattice screens all stained dark brown. The broken profile of roofs scattered and staggered over the steep slope and the consequent changing perspective together with the remnant regrowth eucalypt vegetation reinforced by landscaping based on Australian native species providing shade and shadow to white washed walls all serve to visually enliven the courtyard spaces and pathways on the site.

=== Community Services Building ===
The community services building is a two-storey building which steps down the site and houses a communal dining room, recreation areas and support facilities on the upper level with store rooms and more recently enclosed areas on the lower level to house student counselling services. The building has a large open timber trussed roof and sloping ceilings lined with straw board panels. Pergolas provide shade to several outdoor areas.

=== Residences ===
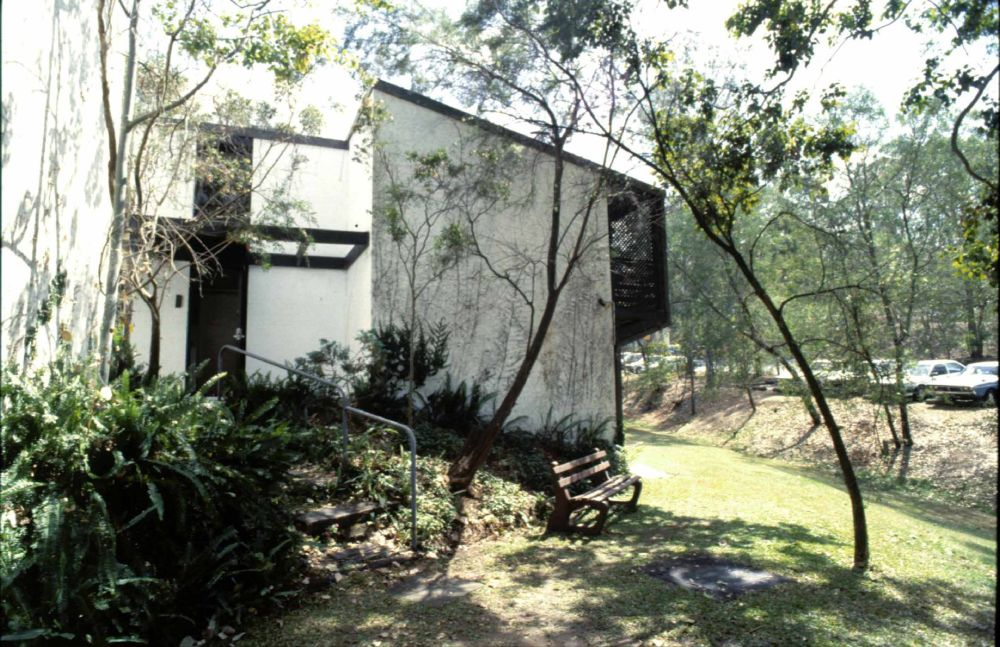
Hall of residence

The residences are divided into two clusters. One cluster comprises four two-storey 4-person maisonettes and one single storey 4-person tutorial unit, while the second cluster contains five two storey 4-person maisonettes and one single storey 4-person tutorial unit. Both clusters have their own laundry and one of the maisonettes in the first cluster had a paraplegic unit.

Each maisonette has two bedrooms per floor with the entry, kitchenette and bathroom adjacent to the half landing of a dogleg stair. A timber framed cantilevered verandah with lattice panelled end walls is provided to the upper bedrooms with a corresponding paved area to the lower floor bedrooms. Additional natural light is provided to the common areas and upper bedrooms through clerestory lighting.

The tutorial units comprise four sleeping areas, a bathroom, kitchenette and study and tutorial areas on one level with timber pergolas providing shade to openings.

== Heritage listing ==
The TAFE Hall of Residence at Kelvin Grove were listed on the Queensland Heritage Register on 25 February 2004.
