= Mount Kent Observatory =

- Organization: University of Southern Queensland
- Observatory code: E22
- Location: Mount Kent, near Nobby, Queensland, Australia
- Coordinates: 27.7977°S 151.8554°E
- Altitude: 682 m (2,238 ft)

Telescopes
- MINERVA-Australis: 4x 0.7 m (2 ft 4 in) equatorial mount
- Stellar Oscillations Network Group (SONG): 2x 0.7 m (2 ft 4 in)
- O'Mara Telescope: See USQ-Louisville Telescope
- Louisville 0.5-m Telescope: 0.5 m (1 ft 8 in) Planewave Instruments CDK-20
- Louisville 0.7-m Telescope: 0.7 m (2 ft 4 in) Planewave Instruments CDK-700
- FUT (SONG) outreach Telescope: 0.6 m (2 ft 0 in) Planewave Instruments CDK-600
- USQ-Louisville Telescope: Planewave Instruments RC-12.5 or Takahashi FSQ106ED wide-field astrograph

Mount Kent
- Location within Queensland

Highest point
- Elevation: 682 m (2,238 ft)
- Coordinates: 27.7977°S 151.8554°E

Geography
- Location: Nobby, Queensland, Australia

Mount Kent Observatory near Toowoomba, in the Darling Downs region of Queensland, Australia, is owned and operated by the University of Southern Queensland (UniSQ). It is the only professional astronomical research observatory in the state of Queensland. Mount Kent hosts five MINERVA-Australis exoplanet-finding telescopes, three SONG telescopes for asteroseismology and stellar astrophysics, two 'Shared Skies' telescopes, and a USQ-Louisville telescope.

It is also used for teaching UniSQ students, and is part of a 'Shared Skies Partnership' with the University of Louisville's Moore Observatory, Kentucky.

== History ==
In the 1980s a dark sky site was established at Mount Kent and used for teaching purposes by USQ. By 2009 the facilities had grown to include the Webb, O'Mara, and the first of the Louisville telescopes. A Planewave CDK700 followed in 2013.

The observatory was significantly expanded beginning in 2016 with the establishment of MINERVA-Australis, funded by UniSQ, the Federal Government, the Australian Research Council, the University of New South Wales and the University of Sydney. It was opened by Minister for Industry, Science and Technology Karen Andrews and UniSQ Vice-Chancellor Professor Geraldine Mackenzie in March 2019.

The asteroid 11927 Mount Kent, which was discovered in 1993, is named after the observatory.

== Telescopes ==
- MINERVA-Australis is an array of four 0.7 m (2 ft 4 in) telescopes, a 0.8 m (2 ft 7 in), and a radial-velocity spectrograph for exoplanet science. Established in 2018, it is used for ground-based observational follow-up for the NASA Transiting Exoplanet Survey Satellite (TESS) and for stellar astrophysics research and teaching. The facility is operated by USQ and funded by the Australian Research Council and a consortium of research-intensive universities in Australia and the United States.
- SONG - the Stellar Oscillations Network Group - has a high resolution spectrograph fed by two 0.7 m (2 ft 4 in) telescopes, used primarily for asteroseismology and stellar physics. It is part of a network with telescopes in Tenerife and China.
- O’Mara is named after the late Mt Kent Observatory pioneer Dr Jim O’Mara (of the University of Queensland). He designed an octagonal enclosure that has hosted telescopes to automatically serve remote imaging requests from USQ and Louisville students. Most recently, a Takahashi wide field FSQ with a larger CCD was installed for Shared Skies on a Paramount. The FSQ was moved to the modern Planewave L-mount USQ-Louisville Telescope.
- The Louisville CDK20 Telescope has 0.5 m (1 ft 8 in) Planewave Instruments CDK-20 optics on an AH200 German equatorial mount as part of the Shared Skies Partnership with the University of Louisville. It is set up for live remote observing.
- The Louisville CDK700 Telescope is a 0.7 m (2 ft 4 in) Planewave Instruments alt-az CDK700 with a ZWO ASI 6200 CMOS camera and Sloan g', r', i', z' filters on an automated focalplane rotator. It provides images fulfilling student requests, and precision photometric observations of exoplanet candidates in collaboration with TFOP, the NASA-TESS follow-up group.
- The FUT (SONG) Telescope has 0.6 m (2 ft 0 in) Planewave Instruments CDK-600 optics used as a research and outreach telescope by the Aarhus University and the SONG team.
- The USQ-Louisville Telescope has optionally a 0.3 m (1 ft 0 in) Planewave Instruments RC-12.5 optical system, or currently a 0.106 m (4.2 in) Takahashi apochromatic astrograph as a teaching and robotic research telescope easily used by students for imaging and bright star photometry.

== Discoveries ==
MINERVA-Australis was used in the discovery of TOI-257b, a rare 'sub-Saturn' planet lying between super-Earths and giant planets. As of 2026, spectroscopy from MINERVA-Australis and photometry from the Louisville telescopes have contributed data in the discovery of more than 40 exoplanets.

== See also ==
- Australian Astronomical Observatory (AAO)
- University of Southern Queensland (USQ)
- List of astronomical observatories
- Lists of telescopes
