= Australian University of the Year =

The Australian Good University Guide's Australian University of the Year was awarded annually between 1993 and 2001. Although the Guide assessed each university under a variety of criteria, the award was not necessarily given to the top Australian university, but rather to the university which performed best in the chosen field for that particular year.

The Award was won jointly in 1999-00 when Deakin University and University of Wollongong received top honours. In 2000-01 University of Wollongong again shared the award having tied with University of Southern Queensland.

Deakin University and University of Wollongong where the only multiple recipients having been named University of the Year twice each.

== List of winners ==
Year	Winner	Field
2001-02	University of Melbourne	'International Standing'
2000-01	University of Wollongong	'Educational Experience' and 'Graduate Outcomes'
	University of Southern Queensland	'Excellence in the e-World'
1999-00	Deakin University	'Outstanding Education and Training Partnerships'
	University of Wollongong	'Outstanding Research and Development Partnerships' and 'Preparing Graduates for the e-World'
1998-99	University of Queensland	'Outstanding Outcomes for Graduates'
1997-98	Charles Sturt University	'Commitment to First Generation University Students'
1996-97	University of New South Wales	'Breadth of the Undergraduate Experience'
1995-96	Deakin University	'Outstanding Technology in Education'
1994-95	Monash University	'The Internationalisation of Undergraduate Education'
1993-94	Queensland University of Technology	'Outstanding Undergraduate Teaching Performance'
