= Edwin Hayes and Campbell Scott =

Australian architects

Edwin James Hayes and Campbell Royston Scott were Australian architects who distinguished themselves through their use of colour and by re-thinking the concept of housing spaces.

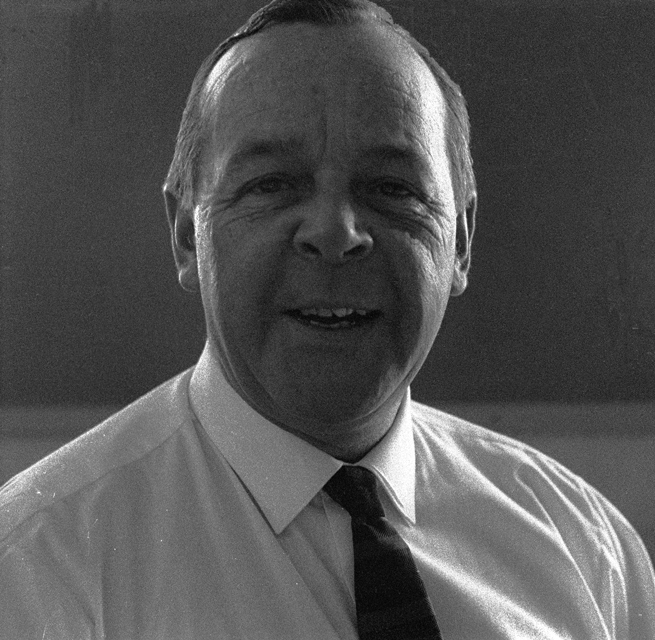
Edwin Hayes architect

== Personal lives ==
=== Edwin J. Hayes ===
Edwin James Hayes was born 23 March 1918 in Brisbane, the son of Edwin Hayes and Kathleen Hayes (née Gredden). He completed secondary school at Saint Ignatius' College, Riverview in Sydney, then attended the Julian Ashton Art School in the Queen Victoria Building, Sydney, for one year. In 1935 he commenced his tertiary education at Brisbane Central Technical College, then went on to complete his articles with E. M. Ford of Chambers & Ford, from 1935 to 1938. In 1939, he moved back to Sydney in order to pass the Board of Architects of NSW examination. Successful in his results and following his registration as an architect, Hayes received his RAIA and decided to move back to Brisbane to re-join the practice of Chambers & Ford. His time with the practice lasted until 1944 as he then chose to join the army where he remained until the end of all hostile action in 1945. Returning to Australian soil, he went on to work for J. P. Donoghue for six months, but resigned from the practice in order to develop a partnership with Campbell Scott which lasted until June 1984. Hayes died in Brisbane on 4 October 1997.

=== Campbell R. Scott ===
Campbell Royston Scott was born 4 May 1921 at Corinda, a suburb of Brisbane. He received his primary education at Coorparoo State School, and later moved to England to complete his secondary schooling at Clifton College. On completion of his courses, Scott had a series of jobs which ranged from selling bacon slicers and weighing scales, to carpentry with his uncle. Scott’s architectural studies began after he undertook an extra year of maths and an art subject in order to begin his study of architecture at Brisbane Central Technical College. During World War Two, Scott also volunteered for the army. His enlistment was denied because the principal of the college (Mr. Cummings) wanted to begin a degree course in architecture at the University of Queensland and his diploma students, including Scott, were required to write a thesis. According to Scott to his amusement his thesis was later described by Professor Cummings as "the worst thesis he had ever read", however Cummings subsequently asked Scott to lecture in final year design at the University. In 1946 Scott completed his sixth year at the University of Queensland and in 1947 was awarded the RAIA Student Medallion. He died in Brisbane on 7 January 2007.

== Notable projects ==
Hayes and Scott began their practice in 1946. Many opportunities presented themselves because of the expansion and development throughout Australia. As major cities began to grow, it became evident that affordable, post-war housing was required. This provided a window for Australian architects to expand their understanding of this sector and to develop ideas and techniques to achieve needed results. Hayes & Scott could stand out as their small, modest, economic and technologically explorative works of slab-on-ground construction, flat roofs and floor-to-ceiling glazing could replace the traditional Queensland corrugated roof houses set on stumps.

=== Harvey Graham House, 1953 ===
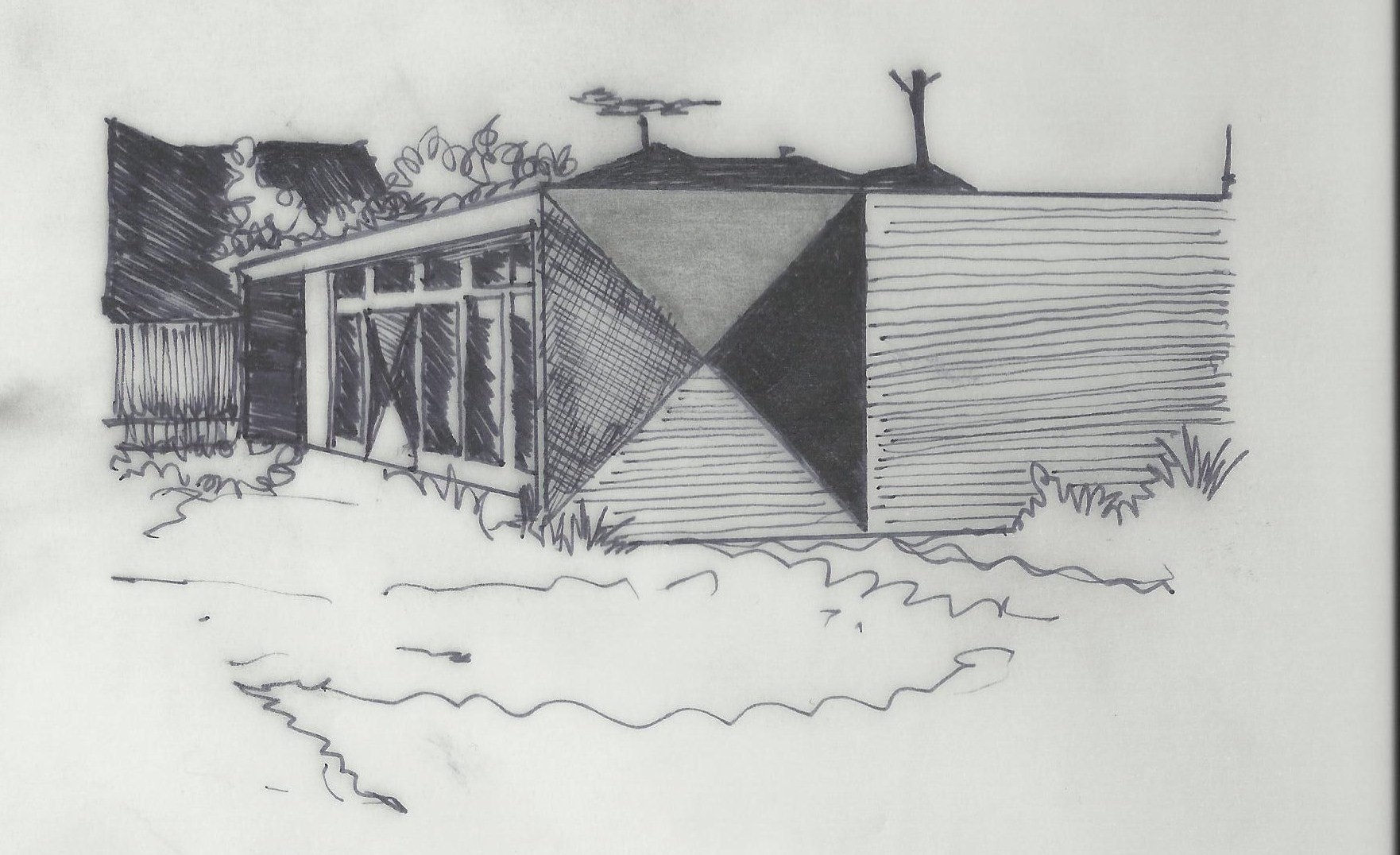
Harvey Graham House, 1953

Their most notable project is the Harvey Graham Beach House, built in 1953. It was seen as a vanguard of post-war residential architecture. The design itself was in typical Hayes & Scott style with a slab-on-ground construction, flat roof and floor-to-ceiling glazing. The project was influenced by architects such as Walter Gropius, Marcel Breuer and Ludwig Mies van der Rohe. Due to similar characteristics, it has also been said that the design of the Beach House was strongly influenced by the drawings of the Case Study House by Charles Eames. Along with the modernist design came the murals which portrayed the partnership’s developmental approach to colour. Their love of using black on everything "against the sky" (e.g. eaves, gutters, chimney caps, etc.) is also seen.

=== The Jacobi House, 1957 ===
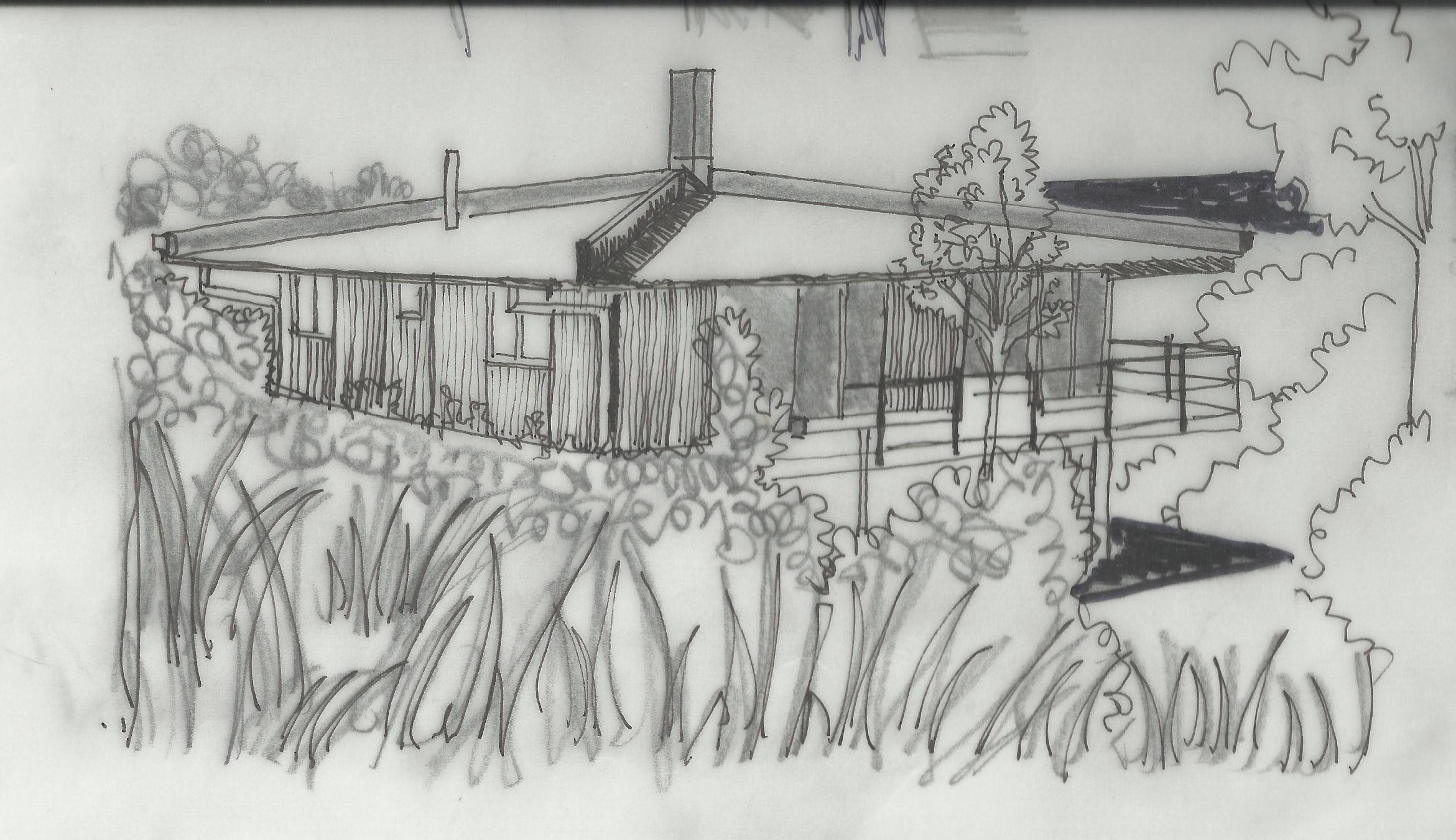
The Jacobi House, 1957

A house designed for Carol and Joan Jacobi on the slopes of Mount Cootha was acknowledged to be one of the firm’s exemplars for regional modern residential projects. The design of the house contributed to the formal transformation of the traditional "Queenslander" – pyramid roof, surrounding verandas on three sides and floor raised on stumps. Particular attention was given to acoustic conditions for the enjoyment of recorded music. This resulted in an open "pavilion" style, where a diagonal split through the overall plan was strategically devised under a low-rise pyramid roof.

=== The Tait House or "Dream home", 1962 ===
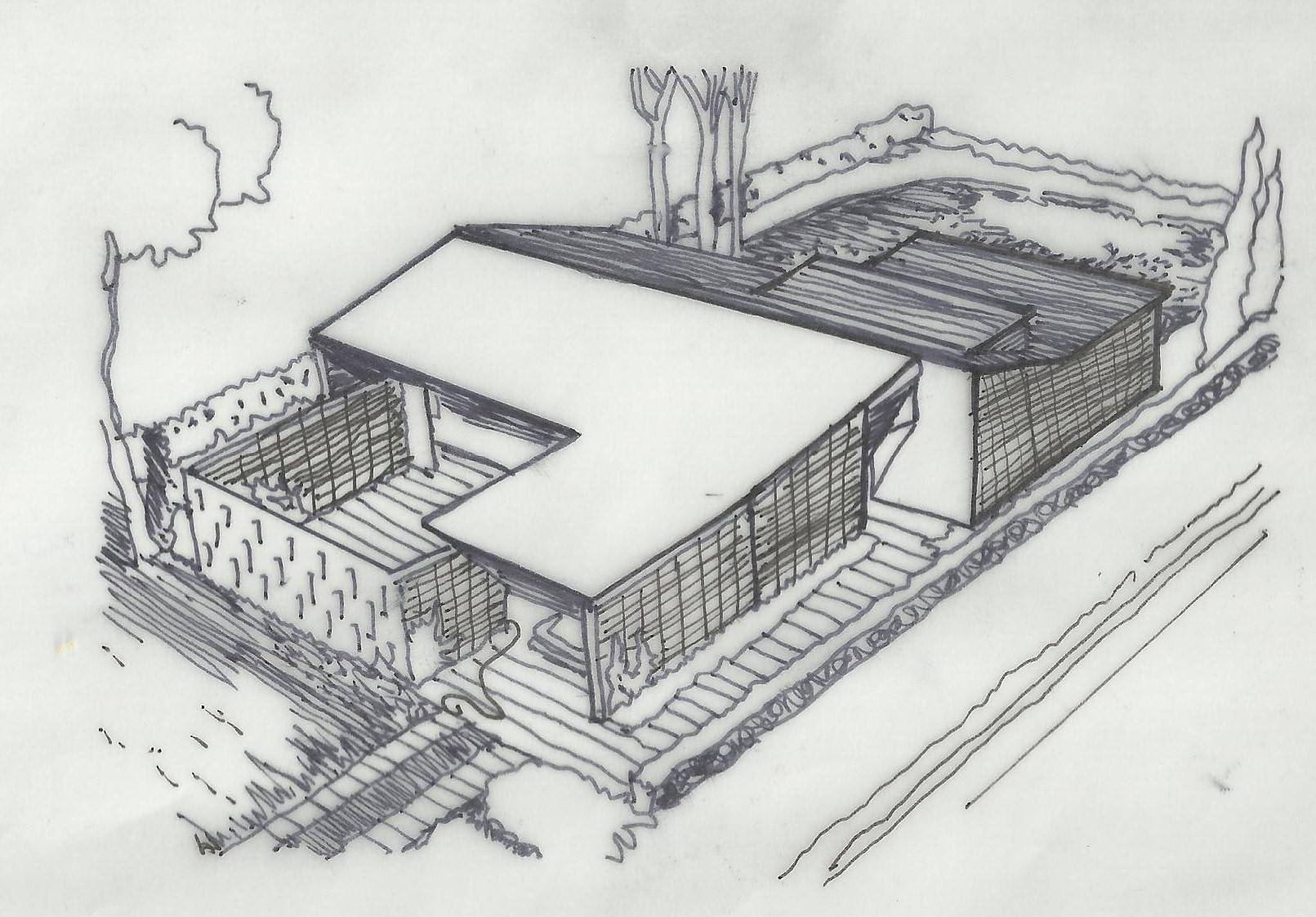
The Tait House or "Dream Home", 1962

This home was designed as part of a competition organised by Hooker-Rex (a real estate development firm) to mark the opening of their Centenary Estate. Alma Tait was the Queensland winner. Hayes & Scott had to satisfy both the developers and the client. All entrants had to answer a series of questions about the designs of their ideal dream home. The results were then calculated and averaged. The results were conventional, so they had to work within those constraints. The final design reflected Tait’s desires but is still recognisable as the work of Hayes & Scott. Terracotta tiles were the result of a public vote in the competition. Interesting features present in this house are large north-facing windows, paved patio, roof overhang, side entry and perforated masonry screen that creates a drying court & rock garden.

=== Other projects ===
- Edwin Hayes: Walter's House, 1946, 99 Alexander Road, Ascot
- Edwin Hayes: Hayes Residence, 1947, 125 The Esplanade, St Lucia (extended in 1966)
- Campbell Scott: Hood House, 1947, 108 Ninth Avenue, St Lucia
- Campbell Scott: Penny House, 1947, 41 Ninth Avenue, St Lucia
- Campbell Scott: Scott's residence, 1948, 43 Ninth Avenue, St Lucia (demolished)
- Edwin Hayes: Frazer House, 1950, Broadbeach Boulevard, Surfers Paradise (demolished)
- Campbell Scott: Vincent House, 1954, 153 Hawken Drive, St Lucia (substantially altered)
- Campbell Scott: Archer House, 1956, Alexandra Parade, Alexandra Beach (demolished)
- Edwin Hayes: Corbould House, 1958, 15 Cannes Avenue, Surfers Paradise
- Edwin Hayes: Herford House, 1958, 41 River Drive, Surfers Paradise (substantially altered)
- Campbell Scott: Clowes Extension, 1961, 66 Central Avenue, St Lucia
- Edwin Hayes: Stubbs House, 1961, 30 Scenic Drive, Kenmore
- Edwin Hayes: Bishop House, 1962, 67 Albatross Avenue, Mermaid Beach (demolished)
- Campbell Scott: Hooker-Rex Display House, Centenary Estates, 1962, 28 Looranah Street, Jindalee
- Campbell Scott: Zlotkowski House, 1967, 49 Monaco Street, Surfers Paradise (demolished)

== Awards ==
- In 1947, Campbell Scott was awarded the RAIA Student Medallion.
- In 1953, the practice was awarded the Queensland Award for Meritorious Architecture for their design of The Pfitzenmaier Beach House.

== Sources ==
- Wilson, Andrew Charles, ed. (2005). Hayes and Scott - Post-War Houses. Univ. of Queensland Press. ISBN 978-0-7022-3506-1.
- Cuffley, Peter (1993). Australian Houses of the Forties & Fifties. Five Mile Press. ISBN 0-86788-578-5.
