= University of Southern Queensland =

University in Toowoomba, Australia

Coordinates: 27.6042°S 151.932°E

- Coat of arms
- Former names: List: Queensland Institute of Technology (Darling Downs) (1967–1971); Darling Downs Institute of Advanced Education (1971–1989); University College of Southern Queensland (1990–1991)
- Motto: Latin: Per Studia Mens Nova
- Motto in English: "Through study the mind is renewed"
- Type: Public research university
- Established: 1967 (as institute of technology); 1992 (as university)
- Accreditation: TEQSA
- Academic affiliations: RUN; OUA; UA
- Budget: A$388.91 million (2023)
- Chancellor: John McVeigh
- Vice-Chancellor: Paul Mazerolle
- Academic staff: 837 (2024)
- Administrative staff: 1,009 (2024)
- Total staff: 1,846 (2024)
- Students: 20,288 (2024)
- Undergraduates: 13,805 (2023)
- Postgraduates: 2,642 coursework (2024); 940 research (2024)
- Other students: 2,334 non-award (2024)
- Location: Toowoomba, Ipswich, and Springfield, Queensland, Australia
- Campus: Urban and regional with multiple sites
- Colours: Gold Plum
- Sporting affiliations: UniSport; EAEN
- Website: unisq.edu.au

The University of Southern Queensland is a public research university based in Toowoomba, Queensland, Australia, the sixth largest city in the Australian state of Queensland. Founded in 1967 after a successful campaign by the local Darling Downs community, the university is a founding member of the Regional Universities Network.

The main Toowoomba campus occupies a large area of south-western Toowoomba in the suburb of Darling Heights. Campuses in Ipswich and Springfield also exist, and the university operates the Inala University Study Hub. The university owns and operates the Mount Kent Observatory, which is the only professional astronomical research observatory in Queensland. The Ravensbourne Field Studies Centre, which acts as a research centre for environmental science, is also operated by the university.

The university is organised into five academic schools and offers undergraduate, postgraduate and research degrees across a broad range of disciplines. Research activity is supported through four research institutes: the Institute for Agriculture, Climate and the Environment; the Institute for Communities and Regional Development; the Institute for Health; and the Institute for Space, Defence and Advanced Technologies. Recent notable research includes the discovery of Gliese 12 b, an Earth-like planet 40 light years away making it the closest located to date.

The University of Southern Queensland is recognised among the world's leading universities. In the Times Higher Education World University Rankings 2026, UniSQ was ranked in the 351-400 band globally. In the QS World University Rankings 2026, UniSQ was ranked 410th in the world.

== History ==
=== 1960 to 1966: Darling Downs University Establishment Association (DDUEA) ===
After a meeting of over 200 members of the Toowoomba community on 2 December 1960, the Darling Downs University Establishment Association (DDUEA) was founded with the purpose of establishing a university in the Darling Downs region. Chaired by former mayor of Toowoomba Dr. Alex McGregor, the association successfully lobbied the local, state, and federal government for the establishment of an Institute of Technology located in Toowoomba. After the establishment of the Queensland Institute of Technology (Darling Downs), the association became known as the Darling Downs Association for Advanced Education (DDAAE), and later Darling Downs Unilink Limited. Darling Downs Unilink Limited went into receivership in 1996, with a subsequent auction of the organisation's art collection.

=== 1967 to 1971: Queensland Institute of Technology (Darling Downs) (QITDD) ===
The Queensland Institute of Technology (Darling Downs) [QITDD] opened on 2 February 1967 in Toowoomba with 140 enrolled students.

=== 1971 to 1989: Darling Downs Institute of Advanced Education (DDIAE) ===
In 1971, the institution was renamed to the Darling Downs Institute of Advanced Education (DDIAE). Managed by its own College Council, DDIAE educated 75% of offshore international students in the 1986–1987 school year.

On the evening of 11 April 1979, a fire destroyed the Administration Building (B Block). This resulted in the loss of the mailroom and switchboard. The cause of the fire was a staff member activating a bank of light switches which, unbeknownst to them, were also connected to a wall strip heater obscured by computer printout paper. While the damage was significant, student academic records were not affected and the institute was able to continue operating.

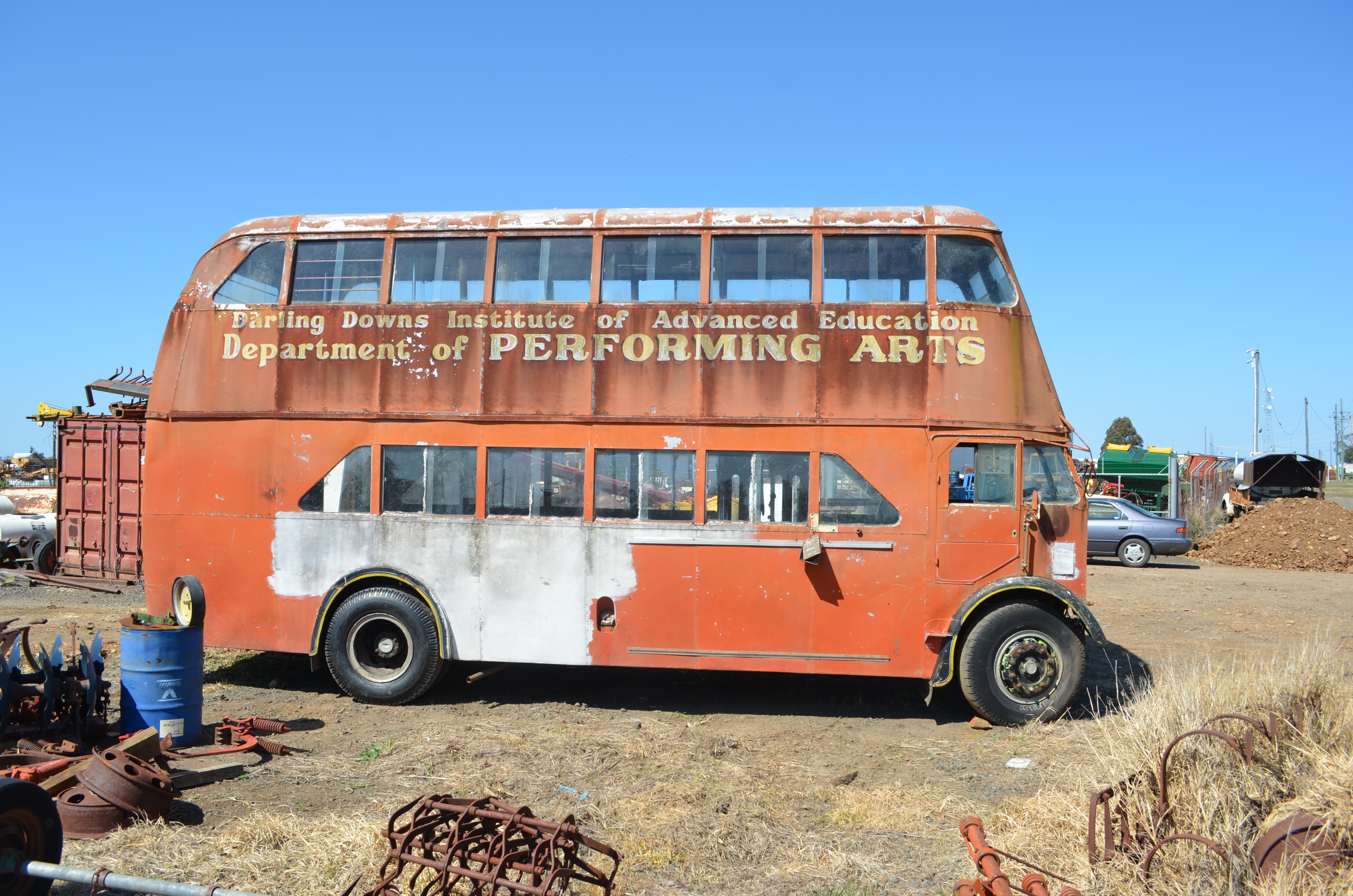
1952 Leyland OPD2 bus used by the Department of Performing Arts at the Darling Downs Institute of Advanced Education (DDIAE)

From 1980 to 1990, DDIAE grew significantly from 1,000 to 8,000 full-time student equivalents (EFTSL).

=== 1990 to 1991: University College of Southern Queensland (UCSQ) ===
It became the University College of Southern Queensland (UCSQ) in 1990, under the sponsorship of the University of Queensland.

=== 1992 to present: University of Southern Queensland (UniSQ, formerly USQ) ===
In 1992, the institution became the University of Southern Queensland when it gained full university status.

The university was a founding member of the Regional Universities Network that was launched in 2011. The Network's research in 2013 showed that the university generated $411.7 million into the economy of Queensland every year as well as household income of $255.4 million and 3,313 jobs in the communities of Toowoomba, Fraser Coast, and Springfield.

In 2012, the university's archaeologists discovered the oldest Australian rock art of 28,000 years old in the Northern Territory, and in 2018, the university's astronomers discovered a new planet that orbits an ancient star almost 2 billion years older than the sun. It has been recognised for its efforts in preventing violence against women and was cited as employer of choice for gender equality by the Federal Government's Workplace Gender Equality Agency (WGEA).

In June 2022, the university announced it was changing its branding from USQ to UniSQ, accompanied by a change in logo.

In June 2025, the Queensland College of Wine Tourism reached a funding deal and transferred away from university operations after the university withdrew funding from the college.

==== Milestones ====
- 2004, 8 July: Groundbreaking was held at Springfield campus.
- 2006, 11 August: Springfield campus was officially opened by Minister for Education and Science Julie Bishop.
- 2007, Semester 1: The first students started their studies at Springfield campus.
- 2014, 5 March: Health & Recreation Club worth of $1.2 million and Engineering Laboratory were opened at Springfield campus.
- 2015, 7 January: Ipswich campus was formally transferred to from the University of Queensland.
- 2015, 10 August: Clinical simulation labs worth of $1.7 million were opened at Ipswich campus.
- 2015, 26 August: Building B (Awarded 6 Star Green Star by Green Building Council of Australia) worth of $45 million was opened at Springfield campus.
- 2016, Semester 1: Bachelor of Aviation was launched at Springfield campus and Bachelor of Midwifery was launched at Ipswich campus.
- 2016, 20 June: Psychology and Counselling Clinic was opened at Ipswich campus.
- 2017, 1 March: Midwifery Simulation Centre and Paramedic Simulation House were opened at Ipswich campus.
- 2017, 27 October: Boeing 737 flight simulator worth of $1 million went into operation at Springfield campus.
- 2017, Semester 2: The first students of Bachelor of Paramedicine were farewelled at Ipswich campus.
- 2026, 23 April: UniSQ opened Australia's first industry-accessible cryogenic measurement laboratory, the Quantum Cryo Lab, at its Springfield campus.

== Organisation and administration ==
=== Governance ===
The fourteen-member council is the governing body of the University of Southern Queensland.

The council is made up of the following people:

- Chancellor
- Vice-chancellor and President
- Chairperson of the academic board
- Five members appointed by Governor in Council
- One elected member of general staff
- One elected member of academic staff
- One elected member of the student body who is not also a staff member
- One additional members who cannot be a student or staff member, with at least one being a graduate

=== Academic schools ===
The university has five schools that support teaching and research:

- School of Business, Law, Humanities and Pathways
- School of Education and Creative Arts
- School of Health, Psychological and Medical Sciences
- School of Nursing and Midwifery
- School of Science, Engineering and Digital Technologies.

The University of Southern Queensland uses multiple academic calendars depending on the academic course studied, with the most common being a Trimester academic calendar.

== Student life ==
=== Sports and athletics ===
In the 2015 Northern Uni Games, student-athletes won a gold medal in women's tennis, both gold and silver medals in lawn bowls, and bronze medals in both men's and women's basketball. In 2016 Northern Uni Games, student-athletes won two gold medals in women's hockey and women's tennis, and a silver medal in open lawn bowls. In 2017 Northern Uni Games, student-athletes won three gold medals in men's tennis, woman's tennis, and golf handicap, one silver medal in men's basketball, and another bronze medal in men's tennis. Students also competed in other sport tournaments at national and international levels, such as represented the Queensland Blades in the 2017 Australian Hockey League Championships, won the first places in ANB Qld State Championships, received the national Green and Gold merit after the annual 2016 Australian University Games, and captained Australia in the 2018 Indoor Hockey World Cup in Germany.

=== Residential colleges ===
The university owns and operates three residential colleges which are all located at the Toowoomba campus:

- McGregor College is a co-educational college founded in 1971 that is named after Dr. Alexander McGregor, a driving force in establishing the university.
- Steele Rudd College is a co-educational college founded in 1969 that is named after famous author Arthur Hoey Davis whose pen name was Steele Rudd
- Concannon College is a co-educational college founded in 1985 that is named after the Concannon family. It was previously owned by the Catholic Dioscese of Toowoomba before being purchased by the university.

=== Clubs and groups ===
The Law Society at the university organises a yearly MOOT competition for law students and a Secondary Schools MOOT competition for young high schoolers. The winners of the university's MOOT competition represent the region to take part in the Association National Championship Moot organised in Brisbane for Australian law students. The winners of the university's Secondary Schools MOOT competition received scholarships to study in law programs at the university. The university's Law Society also organises events for law students to get career advice from professionals and learn to overcome challenges in the profession.

=== Arts and drama ===
Students at the University of Southern Queensland produce plays, films, and entertainment shows addressing culture, gender identity, and the struggles of young people, including Ghosts of Leigh by Dallas Baker, Velvet Bourlevard by Ian Fulton, and I dated Batman by Tammy Sarah. The university also established the Bruce Dawe Poetry Prize (named after the university's first honorary professor for his contribution to the university) in 1999 to honour the most prominent poets in Australia. In addition, Artsworx, established as an art venue and production house, supports students, artists, and community art activities through its McGregor Summer School, McGregor bursary, exhibition sponsorships at Downland Art exhibition, Hampton Art exhibition, GraduArt exhibition (annual art exhibition by students at the university), and art exhibition raising funds for breast cancer treatment at St. Vincent Hospital.

=== Extracurricular activities ===
Students, staff, and faculty members of the university engage in a variety of extracurricular activities, such as taking part in the One Million Stars to End Violence project, organising symposiums to change people's attitude about children with autism, improving literacy for Indigenous children, and providing healthcare to disadvantaged communities in Thailand. In 2017, the Association for Tertiary Education Management (ATEM) presented Stars Campaign to End Violence with the Engagement Australia Award for Excellence in Community Engagement. In 2015, the Enactus National Conference and Competition recognised three projects (Cash to Grow, Tertiary Texts, and Project Ignite) by eight University of Southern Queensland students (majoring in business, accounting, law, human services, psychology, and education) for creating positive impacts in local communities. The members of the university's Golden Key Chapter (an invitation-only honour society, including of top 15% students from universities worldwide based on their academic achievement) also engage in a wide range of activities to serve the community, including volunteering with local schools, youth clubs, and state emergency service.

== Academic profile ==
=== Educational programs ===
It provides on-campus education that serves Darling Downs, Southern and Western Queensland as well as flexible learning programs through external learning or via off campus and overseas education partners in southern Africa, Fiji, South-east Asia, Sweden, Norway, and The Emirates. It operates the European Study Center in Bretten, Germany. The university maintains accreditations for professional programs with professional and competent authorities, such as Australian Psychology Accreditation Council (APAC), Australian Nursing and Midwifery Accreditation Council (ANMAC), Legal Practitioners Admissions Board and Chief Justice of Queensland, Chartered Institute of Management Accountants (CIMA), Association of International Accountants (AIA), CPA Australia, Chartered Accountants Australia and New Zealand (CAANZ), Australian Computer Society, and Australian Human Resources Institute (AHRI). The university won the Australian University of the Year Award in 2000–2001. The university has 14 fields of research rated at and above world average standards by Excellence in Research for Australia (ERA) in 2015. In the last audit, the ERA acknowledged the university's pharmaceutical sciences, materials engineering, pharmacology, environmental science and management as well above world average standards. Attested with Quality System Certification of Registration, The university maintains high educational standards through a program of centralised, staff-driven decision-making, discipline-based management, and quality assurance practices.A 2002 audit found that its quality assurance program could be more effective with improved systems of central monitoring and reviewing.

Beside providing a digital learning platform (partly funded with $50 million by the federal government) for all courses and disciplines, the university also provides students with face-to-face instructions and real-life experiences, including the opportunity for students in the Bachelor of Applied Media (BMA) program to do all parts of production and direction of Connected, a lifestyle show produced for 31 Digital. Students at the university took part in and won top awards at Miami and Tropfest international film competitions. The agreement between the West Wellcamp Airport and the Airline Academy of Australia includes that the university provide undergraduate and post-graduate training for aviators in coordination with the academy's programs. Students in aviation program will receive professional pilot qualification issued by Australian Civil Aviation Authority after graduation and have the opportunities to take trial flights before commencing the program. They also have access to work-based training and further career development with Qantas Future Pilots Program. The university organised field trips for nursing students to provide healthcare in rural communities in Vietnam (funded through federal government's New Colombo program) and for researchers to raise awareness of root-lesion in India.

Professors and researchers at the university gained important positions with regional and international organisations, such as Fulbright and Queensland's Institute of Electrical and Electronics Engineers (IEEE). The university's students benefit from partnerships and exchange programs between the university and other universities and organisations, such as Australian National University, University of California Riverside, and NASA. The university offers students a number of scholarships each year, such as School Partners Programs Scholarship and Vice-Chancellor's Principal's Recommendation Scholarship. Visitor speakers and lecturers at the university come from different professional backgrounds, including NASA astronaut Colonel Robert S. Kimbrough, Chief Justice of the High Court Susan Kiefel, News Director Mike Dalton from Nine News Regional Queensland, rugby player Steve Walter, and bestselling author Steve Maraboli.

=== Research ===
The university's research is organised into four institutes of which three contain research centres:

Institute for Space, Defence and Advanced Technologies:

- Centre for Astrophysics
- Centre for Future Materials

Institute for Agriculture, Climate and the Environment:

- Centre for Agricultural Engineering
- Centre for Applied Climate Sciences
- Centre for Crop Health
- Centre for Sustainable Agricultural Systems

Institute for Communities and Regional Development:

- Centre for Rural Economies
- Centre for Heritage and Culture

Institute for Health

Based on competitive grants won and industry-funded research collaborations, the university has significant and core research strength in the broad area of agriculture and the environment. This core research strength generated over $10 million in new grant and industry funding, announced by vice-chancellor Bill Lovegrove in 2008. In 2003, the university established the Institute for Agriculture and the Environment (IAgE) with improved biotechnology and pathology laboratories. In 2017, the Queensland Drought Mitigation Centre (QDMC) was established as a result of collaboration between the university and the government. In 2017, as a part of the mega $15m campus expansion, the university started upgrading the Agricultural Science and Engineering Precinct (ASEP) to facilitate agricultural and material engineering development, including constructing new microbiology laboratories, glasshouses, dehumidified storage, and controlled ecological environments, developing methods of soil pathogen resistance, and applying vision sensing and robotics trials. In 2017, the university hosted Australia's first regional meeting with Australia-ASEAN Council (AAC) in Toowoomba Campus to discuss the issue of trade and agriculture in preparation for the Sydney ASEAN-Australia Special Summit in 2018. The participants addressed the global demand for food, the current problems in the industry, and the development of new technologies in environmental science, engineering, and agribusiness. In 2018, a new climate project of $8 million was established by the university, the Queensland government, and the MLA, bringing together world scientists to find better solutions for managing drought and predicting seasonal climates. Researchers at the university undertake different roles with international climate organisations, such as the president of the United Nations' World Meteorological Organization (with the commission to design better services for global agribusiness and climate risk management) and ocean expeditor in the Overturning in the Subpolar North Atlantic Program (with the mission to examine how ocean currents affect the world's weather). The university also supports the usage of renewable energy by integrating 2MW solar power system with the carpark in Toowoomba campus to provide energy to the campus's activities, reducing the emission of carbon dioxide by 20 percent.

In addition, the university has developed projects in the fields of construction industry and space research. The university's Centre for Future Materials (CFM) has researched and applied the technique of fibre reinforced polymer (FRP) in the project of Toowoomba City Hall renovation. The university, in collaboration with the Commonwealth Scientific and Industrial Research Organisation (CSIRO) and international researchers, has developed a project in researching green cement without reliance on clay and limestone. In 2017, the university, in collaboration with University of Sydney and University of New South Wales, received funding to build a telescope facility at Mount Kent Observatory, Darling Downs, Queensland. The new telescope facility has been supporting Australian astronomers to discover planet systems and perform an important role in NASA's TESS (Transiting Exoplanet Survey Satellite) mission.

=== Academic reputation ===
University rankings

Global – Overall
- ARWU World: 601–700 (2025)
- CWTS World: 821 (Note: The CWTS Leiden Ranking is based on P (top 10%).) (2024)
- QS World: =410 (2026)
- THE World: 351–400 (2026)
- USNWR Global: 278 (25/26)

National – Overall
- ARWU National: 26–27 (2025)
- CWTS National: 26 (2024)
- ERA National: 27 (2018)
- QS National: 23 (2026)
- THE National: 23–25 (2026)
- USNWR National: 19 (25/26)
- AFR National: 28 (2025)

In the 2024 Aggregate Ranking of Top Universities, which measures aggregate performance across the QS, THE and ARWU rankings, the university attained a position of #373 (26th nationally).

National publications

In the Australian Financial Review Best Universities Ranking 2025, the university was ranked #28 amongst Australian universities.

Global publications

In the 2026 Quacquarelli Symonds World University Rankings (published 2025), the university attained a tied position of #410 (23rd nationally).

In the Times Higher Education World University Rankings 2026 (published 2025), the university attained a position of #351–400 (tied 23–25th nationally).

In the 2025 Academic Ranking of World Universities, the university attained a position of #601–700 (tied 26–27th nationally).

In the 2026–2027 U.S. News & World Report Best Global Universities, the university attained a tied position of #345 (23rd nationally).

In the CWTS Leiden Ranking 2024, the university attained a position of #821 (26nd nationally).

=== Student outcomes ===
The Australian Government's QILT (Note: Abbreviation for Quality Indicators for Learning and Teaching.) conducts national surveys documenting the student life cycle from enrolment through to employment. These surveys place more emphasis on criteria such as student experience, graduate outcomes and employer satisfaction than perceived reputation, research output and citation counts.

In the 2023 Employer Satisfaction Survey, graduates of the university had an overall employer satisfaction rate of 85.6%.

In the 2023 Graduate Outcomes Survey, graduates of the university had a full-time employment rate of 85.1% for undergraduates and 89.2% for postgraduates. The initial full-time salary was A$80,000 for undergraduates and A$105,500 for postgraduates.

In the 2023 Student Experience Survey, undergraduates at the university rated the quality of their entire educational experience at 77.4% meanwhile postgraduates rated their overall education experience at 78%.

== Campuses and facilities ==
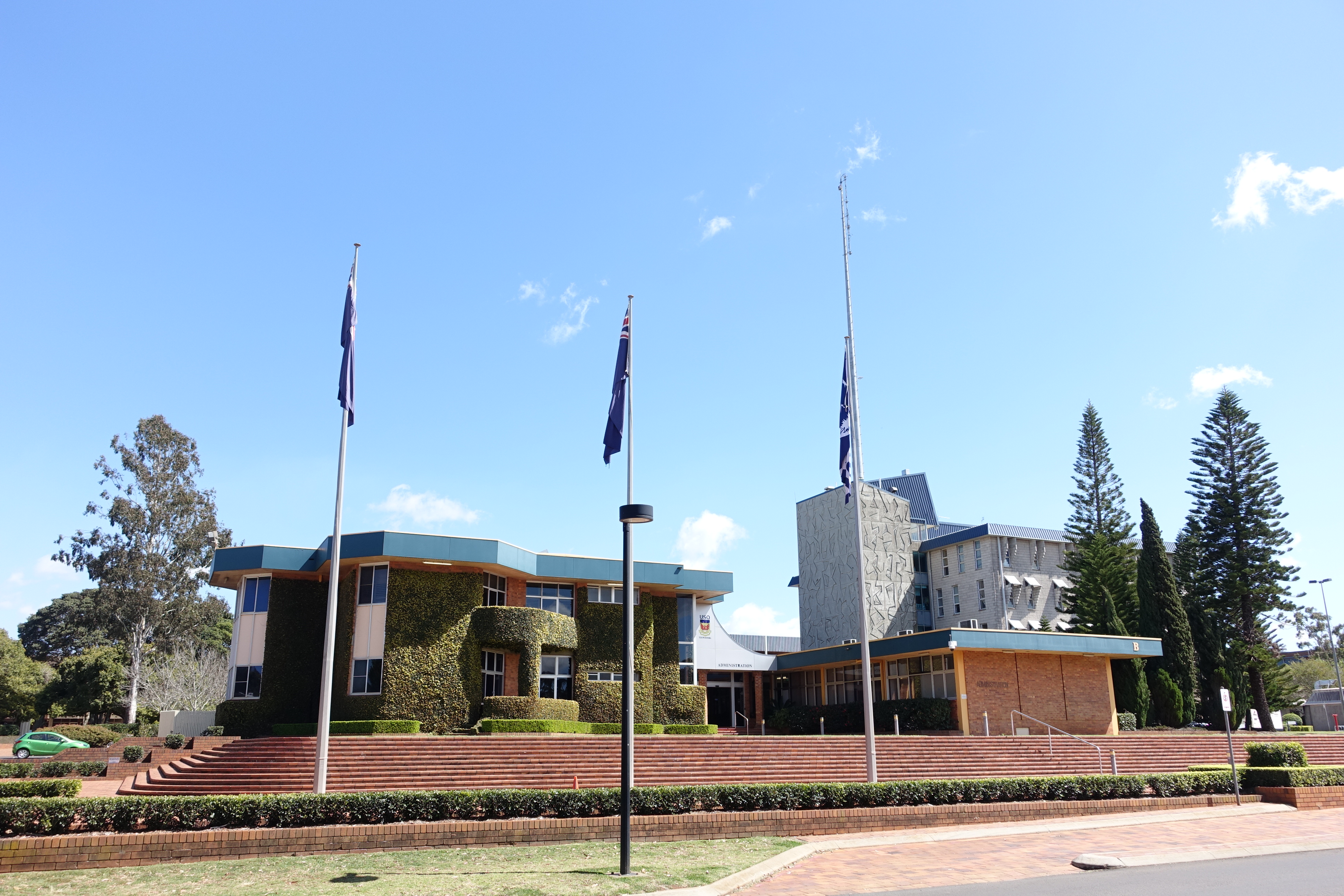
Toowoomba campus

=== Toowoomba campus ===
The university's Toowoomba campus is close to Toowoomba Wellcamp Airport and is approximately a two-hour drive from Brisbane. The campus has lecture theatres and syndicate rooms in the School of Business Building. The campus offers degrees in sciences, creative arts and media, business and commerce, engineering and built environment, education, health and community, information technology, humanities and communication, law and justice, English language programs, and pathway programs. There is a theatre, science laboratories, Olympic standard basketball courts, a 24 hour-access gym with high-tech equipment, a tennis centre, an aerobics centre, and netball courts at the Clive Berghofer Rec Center, social clubs, and other accommodation. It has the country's largest Japanese-designed garden (the Ju Raku En) and the Gumbi Gumbi gardens. Three co-educational residential colleges located on this campus are McGregor, Steele Rudd, and Concannon.

=== Ipswich campus ===
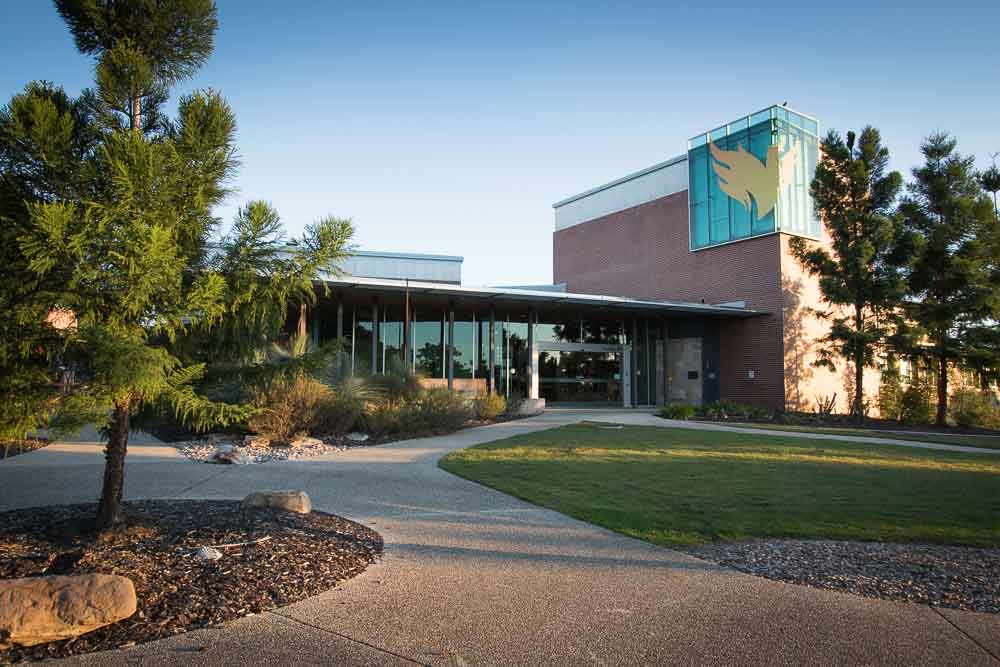
University of Southern Queensland, Ipswich campus

The university's Ipswich campus is located in the growing region of southeast Queensland, 40 minutes from the Brisbane CBD. The campus is home to the university's health programs, which has laboratories for clinical nursing students, custom-built training facilities for paramedicine students, café, gym, and different sports fields. The Ipswich campus offers degrees in nursing, paramedicine, psychology, and counselling as well as tertiary preparation programs. The campus also includes a library with a rainforest and water features designed to increase air quality and contribute to the learning environment. The University of Queensland (UQ) Ipswich Campus was transferred to UniSQ on 7 January 2015 following an agreement between the two universities. The decision to transfer the Campus was motivated by a desire to increase tertiary education opportunities in the region and to reflect the strategic objectives of each university. In stage two of the Sustainable Energy Solution project commenced in September 2017, 1198 solar panels were installed on building rooftops across campuses in Springfield and Ipswich, generating 586,949 kilowatt hours and reducing thousands of tonnes of carbon emissions each year. As of 31 May 2018, smoking is banned in all areas of the university.

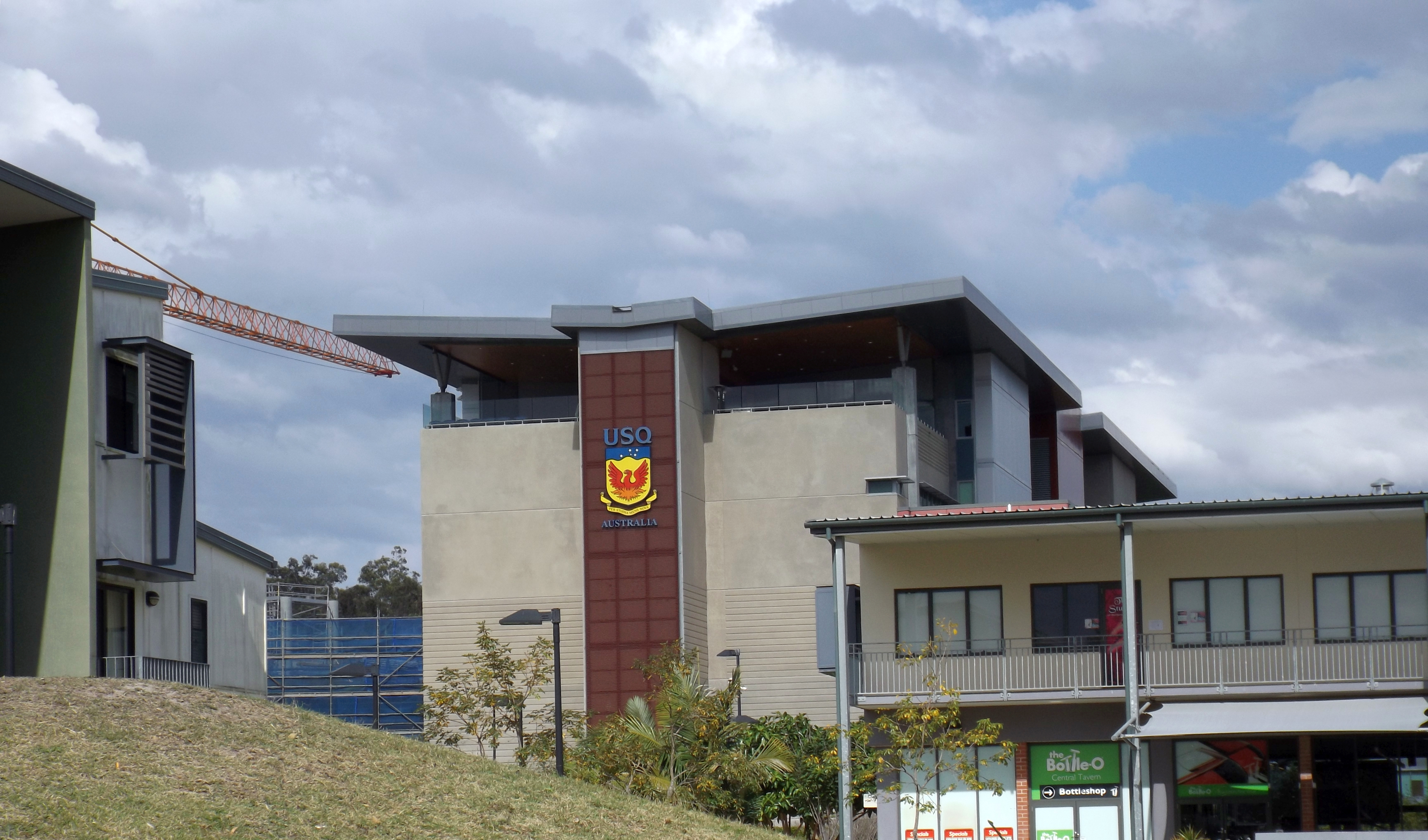
Springfield campus buildings, 2014

=== Springfield campus ===
The university's Springfield campus is located at Springfield, a suburb of approximately 30 kilometres (19 mi) southwest of Brisbane CBD, 1 hour from the Gold Coast, and about 20 minutes from Ipswich CBD. Springfield's public transportation includes bus services and a return train to Brisbane CBD. Serving as a hub for digital production and performance, the campus offers a range of undergraduate and postgraduate programs and includes a radio station, science and engineering laboratories, a television studio with spaces for rehearsal, collaborative teaching rooms, a fitness and recreation centre, an auditorium, and on-campus accommodation. The campus's flight simulator is helpful for aviation students to replicate both normal and abnormal scenarios of a flight with checks and procedures applied to airline pilots. Phoenix Radio at the Springfield campus is an online community radio station that serves the Greater Ipswich region and also provides training for students enrolled in the Bachelor of Applied Media program. In 2026, the campus became home to Australia's first industry-accessible cryogenic measurement laboratory, the Quantum Cryo Lab, supporting the development and testing of next-generation quantum technologies.

=== Inala University Study Hub ===
The university operates the Inala University Study Hub with study spaces, computers internet, and printers available. The hub is located at Level 1, 20 Wirraway Parade in Inala.

=== Mount Kent Observatory ===
See main article Mount Kent Observatory

=== Ravensbourne Field Studies Centre ===
Closely located to the Ravensbourne National Park, the Ravensbourne Field Studies Centre is used by students and researchers in the School of Agriculture and Environmental Science to collect data and survey the natural environment. The centre has recently re-opened been after a decade of being vacant.

== Notable alumni and faculty ==
- Angie Asimus – TV presenter on Seven News Sydney.
- Alix Bidstrup – actress, starred on All Saints as Amy Fielding.
- Kathryn Campbell – disgraced former Australian public servant, former senior officer Australian Army Reserve, 2011 Alumnus of the Year
- Kev Carmody – Singer and songwriter, ARIA Hall of Fame
- Teresa Hsu Chih – Singaporean social worker
- Melanie Zanetti – Australian actress, best known for voicing Chilli Heeler on Bluey
- Richard Dalla-Riva – Australian politician, Minister for Manufacturing, Exports and Trade from 2010 to 2013
- Russell Dykstra – Australian actor
- Aisake Eke – Former Minister of Finance and National Planning, Kingdom of Tonga
- Deb Frecklington – Australian politician, first female leader of LNP
- Jason Gann – Actor and writer
- Stephen Hagan – Australian former diplomat, author, activist, newspaper editor, documentary maker, and university lecturer
- Shameel Joosub – South African businessman and CEO of Vodacom, a South African telecommunications operator within Africa
- Atul Khare – Indian Foreign Service officer, United Nations Under-Secretary-General for Field Support
- Preetha Krishna – Indian spiritual teacher
- Nelle Lee – Australian actress, producer and writer
- Jamus Lim – Singaporean Member of Parliament and economist
- Katrina Fong Lim – Lord Mayor of Darwin (3 April 2012 – 4 September 2017)
- Paul Lucas – Former politician and Attorney-General of Queensland
- John McVeigh – former Minister for Regional Development, Territories and Local Government
- Stuart Mayer – Commander Australian Fleet, Royal Australian Navy, from 2014 to 2018
- Claire Moore – Australian politician, Queensland senator
- Tina Morgan – Australian taekwondo coach and former international competitor
- Ingrid Moses – Australian academic, Chancellor of the University of Canberra from 2006 to 2011
- Joe Roff – Rugby union footballer, CEO of John James Foundation
- Anne Ruston – Australian politician, South Australia senator
- Sebastian Teo – Singaporean politician and President of NSP
- Christian Thompson – Artist
- Adam Zwar – Actor and writer
- Sarah Low May - Singer, Dancer, Actress, and Astrologer.

== See also ==
- List of universities in Australia
