= Anzac Day in Queensland =

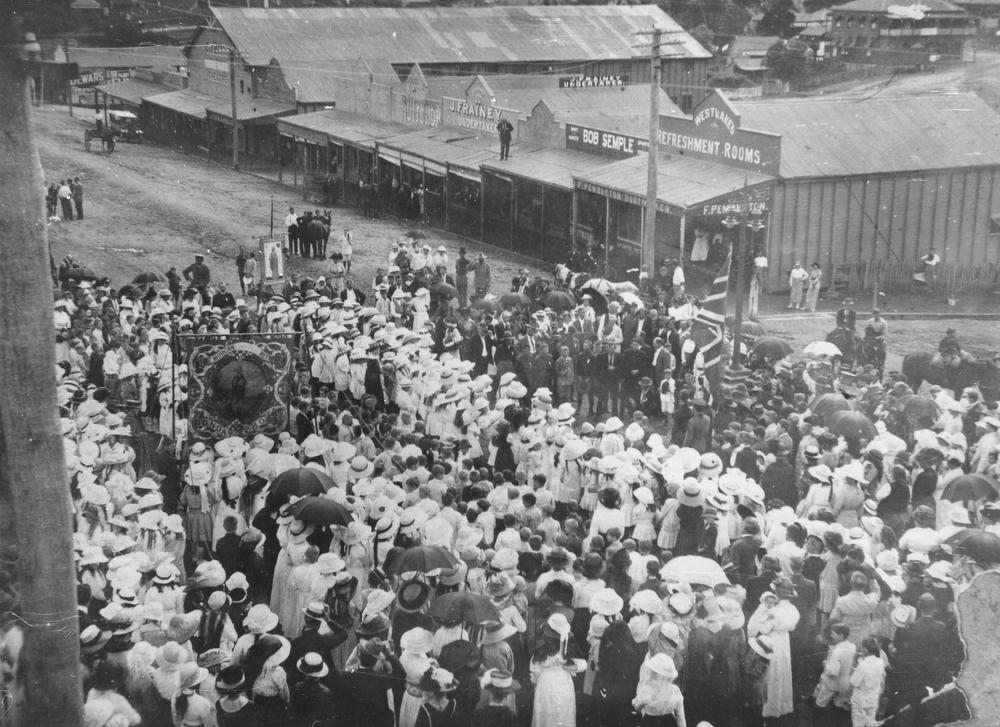
Anzac Day parade on Dee Street, Mount Morgan, 25 April 1916

Anzac Day is a day of remembrance in Queensland, Australia. It is a public holiday held on 25 April each year. The date is significant as the Australian and New Zealand troops (the ANZACs) first landed at Gallipoli in World War I on 25 April 1915.

== Background ==
Anzac Day observance in Australia did not begin as a government initiative, nor was it instigated by returned services associations. Indeed, in the lead up to 25 April 1916, the date of the first anniversary of the landing, acting Prime Minister George Pearce was less than enthusiastic about the event, suggesting that the nation might wait for a military victory before setting a date for commemoration.

The idea of an "Anzac Day" had been mooted since shortly after the Gallipoli landing in 1915 and there were a range of events in 1915 bearing that name.

== Anzac Day Commemoration Committee ==
It was in Queensland that the first major organisational endeavours towards an anniversary commemoration began. The Gallipoli campaign resulted in 26,000 Australian injured, including more than 8,000 deaths. The public need to remember this sacrifice resulted in a public meeting in the Exhibition Hall in Brisbane on 10 January 1916, which was attended by many influential public figures including the Premier T J Ryan, the Governor Sir Hamilton Goold-Adams and the Mayor of Brisbane, George Down. As a result of the public meeting, an Anzac Day Commemoration Committee (ADCC) was formed.

"On the 10 January 1916, the Anzac Day Commemoration Committee was formed as a citizen's committee by a mass meeting of people of Brisbane and appointed to make arrangements for, and carry out, the celebration of ANZAC Day as a gift of the people to commemorate the fallen, remember the wounded and recognise the courage of Australia's servicemen."

Although a government agency per se, the committee consisted of Cabinet members, including the Premier, as well as members from the opposition. Its executive comprised a significant number of clergymen, the most energetic and influential being Anglican Canon David Garland. It was under his stewardship that much of the planning of the first and subsequent events was carried out.

Premier Ryan actively promoted the idea of commemoration within the state and among the other state Premiers. Without his considerable influence, Anzac Day would not have been established as a significant civic event at this time. The Minister for Education, Herbert Hardacre was also a member of the ADCC and establishment of commemoration in the Queensland school calendar and curriculum was a high priority.

A number of factors – apart from the organisational zeal of Garland and the ADCC – contributed to the event's efficacy. Anzac commemoration first emerged at a time where the initial public enthusiasm for the war was on the wane. In December 1915, the Australian Imperial Force had withdrawn from the Dardanelles to recover from the defeat. Enlistment figures, boosted by the public euphoria created by the reportage of the Gallipoli landing, had peaked in July 1915. It was never to return to such heights for the duration of the war. Compulsory military conscription, introduced in Britain in early 1916, was suggested by some as a solution in Australia. While Australians had yet to experience the blood bath that occurred at Pozières and Fromelles in the European summer of 1916, the casualty lists from Gallipoli had brought home the reality of war to many in Australia.

Anzac Day was then, in part, conceived as a solemn memorial day to honour those who had given their lives for the nation and the British Empire. It was hoped that the widespread grieving might be consoled by the public acknowledgment that their loved ones had died in a just and honourable cause. However, the day was designed from the outset to serve many purposes. Its organisational origins lay with the Queensland Recruiting Committee. The inclusion of a military march was specifically designed to promote enlistment and to galvanise the nation's war effort. The notion that 25 April 1915 constituted the "birth of the nation" had been articulated since Empire Day (24 May) speeches in May 1915. By April 1916 that notion of the "birth of the nation" had wide currency. A powerful Anzac mythology was built up around the military prowess of the Australian soldier which accompanied that narrative of national birth. The first Anzac events in Brisbane and elsewhere were a combination of civic requiem, recruiting rally, fund-raising carnival and celebration of nationhood – with different representative phases of the commemoration emphasising those aspects. People thronged the streets in April 1916 to cheer the parading soldiers in such numbers that there were major issues of crowd control on some parts of the march.

State Library of Queensland holds the records of Queensland's Anzac Day Commemoration Committee. The collection consists of minutes, suggestions, correspondence, cutting books, circulars, photographs and miscellaneous papers relating to the Anzac Day Commemoration Committee. In 2019, Minutes and Suggestions 1916–1922 - the first item in this collection, was added to UNESCO's Memory of the World Australian Register. The collection has been digitised and available to view online.

== First ANZAC Day in Queensland ==
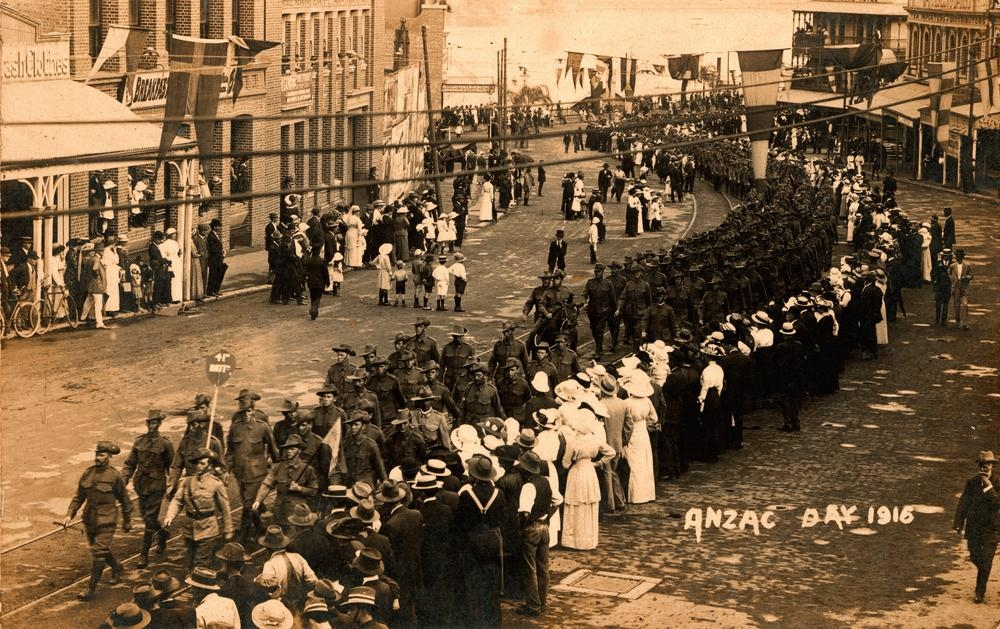
First Anzac Day parade in Brisbane, 25 April 1916

The first observance of Anzac Day in Queensland was on the first anniversary of the Gallipoli landings on 25 April 1916. It consisted on a number of events, including church services in the morning, a marching parade of veterans and military personnel, evening gatherings, and a minute's silence at 9 pm.

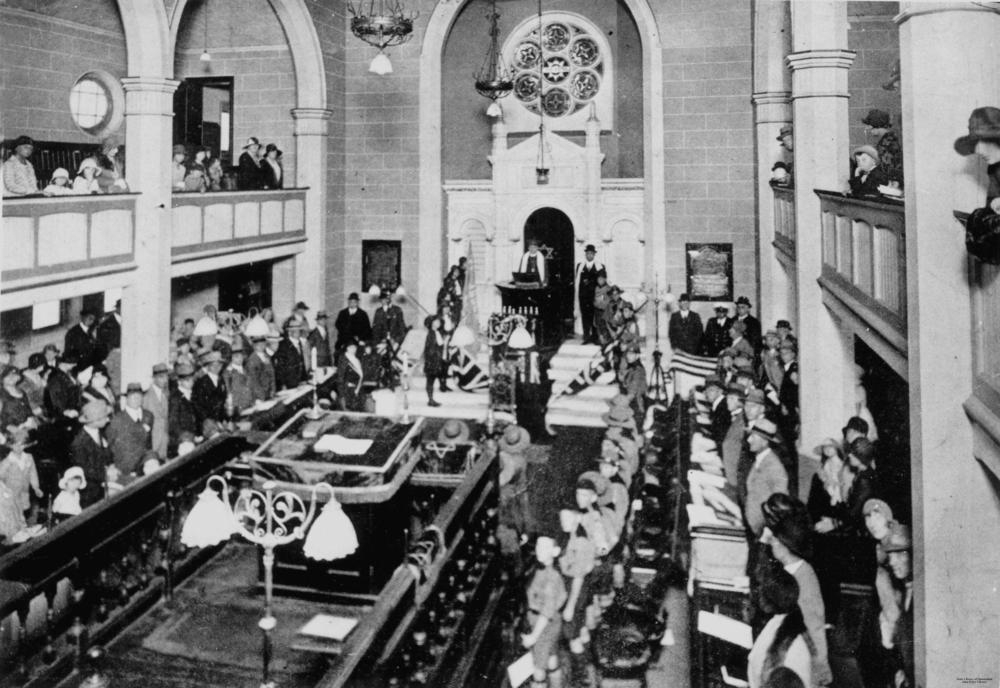
Anzac Day ceremony, Brisbane Synagogue, 1930

Although Canon Garland was a deeply committed Anglican, he was well aware that the Australian servicemen and those who would want to mourn or commemorate them would come from a wide range of faiths, which would create difficulties incorporating religious elements into the ceremonies. For example, it was not customary for Protestants to pray for the souls of the dead, Roman Catholics would not attend a religious event led by a non-Catholic, and Jews believed in God but not in the Holy Trinity. Therefore, at any public event (outside of those organised within a place of worship), Garland recommended that instead of prayers spoken from the podium, all present be asked to spend a minute in silent prayer or reflection according to their own beliefs. Garland also proposed that any hymn singing should be limited to those that would be acceptable to all faiths, e.g. those that mentioned God but not of the Holy Trinity, e.g. Our God, our Help in Ages Past. Given these founding principles, public Anzac Day ceremonies in Queensland are generally secular with singing often limited to the national anthem.

== A holy day or a holiday? ==
The different views on the role of Anzac Day created debates about whether the day should be a "holy day" or a holiday. Though the Premier had appealed for businesses to voluntarily close, Anzac Day was not formally gazetted as a public holiday in Queensland during the wartime commemorations. However, some public servants were granted leave to attend the church memorial services in the morning.

Garland and the ADCC did not favour the declaration of a public holiday, insisting that the day's distinctive status as a day of "solemn commemoration … might be easily lost if gazetted". While returned servicemen who were state and federal public servants were typically given time to attend the commemorations, decisions about the others were left to their private employers. After the war, there was increasing unrest amongst working ex-servicemen who were denied access to Anzac Day through work commitments. Queensland's Anzac Day Holiday Act of 1921 began the process of assuring the day's status in the memorial calendar, but it did not confirm it. While the 1921 Act ensured the closure of hotels and race meetings on the day, it was not formally inscribed as a "close holiday" (now called a public holiday) until amendments were legislated in 1930.

The tensions between the day's solemn elements and the need for returned soldiers to "let off steam" are evidenced in the large numbers of police reports in the archives in the 1920s and 1930s from the Licensing Department for the prosecution of hotel owners for illegal opening. Some anonymous informants insisted on advising police of those establishments which they considered were in "scandalous breach" of the Liquor Act.

Despite the entreaties of its organisers, the tensions at its inception between the day's funereal elements and its celebratory ones continue to characterise Anzac Day. It has been suggested that both modes of commemoration have contributed to its lasting hold on the Australian national imagination and the ongoing public support of the ceremonies.

== Anzac Day commemorations over time ==
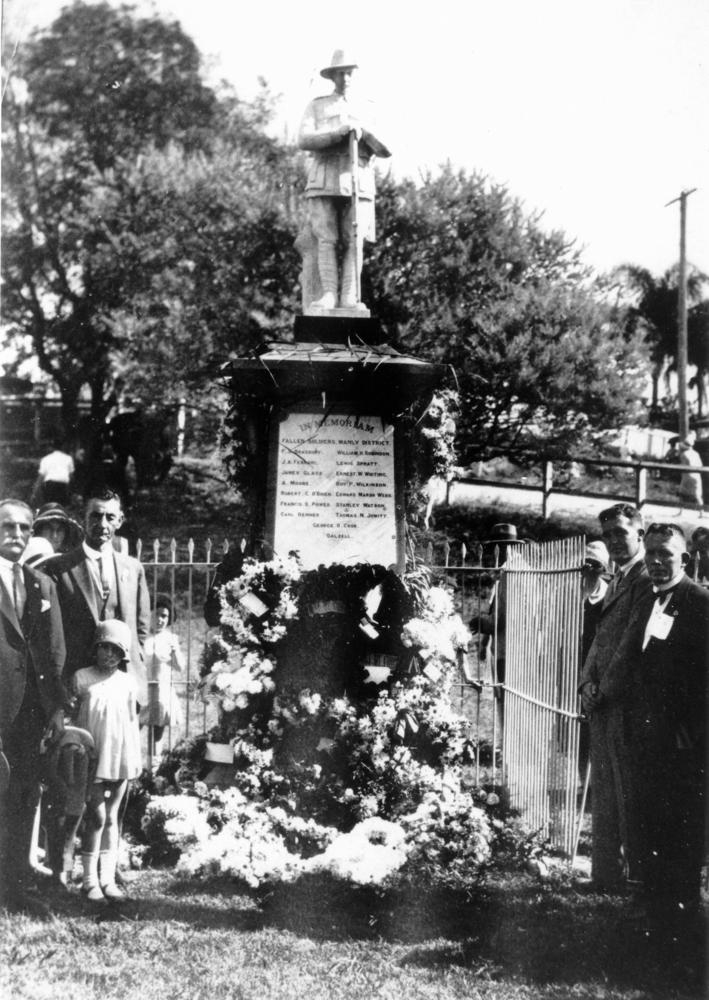
Wreath laying ceremony on Anzac Day at the Manly War Memorial, Brisbane, 1922

The commemoration of Anzac Day has changed over the years since the first one in 1916. After World War I was over, many communities built World War I war memorials and established branches of The Returned Sailors and Soldiers Imperial League of Australia, now called the Returned and Services League of Australia (RSL). Over the years, the RSL has taken over the arrangements for Anzac Day services in many communities in Queensland and Anzac Day services are often held at the local war memorial.

As Queensland has become increasingly secular, fewer people attend Anzac Day church services, preferring the more inclusive ceremonies at the war memorials. This preference validates David Garland's long insistence that Anzac Day ceremonies should not linked to any particular religion or denomination to attract wide public participation.

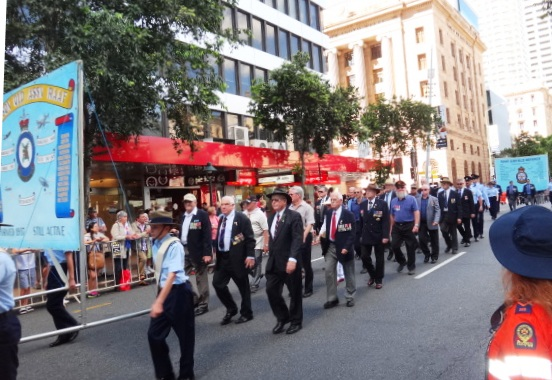
2013 Anzac Day parade in Brisbane with veterans (medals on left breast) marching with relatives (medals on right breast)

The honour of marching in the Anzac Day parade was originally restricted to veterans who had seen active service in World War I, but this was relaxed over time to include active and veteran military personnel. As World War I veterans aged and became more frail, they found it more difficult to march. Although car transport was available to frail veterans to participate in the parades, many preferred to march alongside their comrades assisted by a family member (perhaps pushing them in a wheelchair). This led in turn to family members wishing to march in place of a deceased veteran. Most Anzac ceremony now allow family members to march in the place of a deceased serviceman, but marching by family members of living servicemen remains a contentious issue.

It also became increasingly common for the relatives of deceased ANZACs to attend Anzac Day services wearing their veteran's medals. Initially, many disapproved of this practice, pointing out that the medals of a deceased soldier were technically the property of the Australian Government (although the government has never sought to have the medals returned). The compromise reached was that family members are now welcome to wear the medals at Anzac Day ceremonies provided they do so on their right breast (only the person to whom they were awarded may wear them on the left breast) and to do so with appropriate respect and decorum.

Although a number of public holidays in Queensland are gazetted each year to be held on Monday (in order to create a long weekend) rather than the actual anniversary they celebrate, Anzac Day is always held on 25 April in Queensland.

On 25 April 2015, Queensland commemorated the Centenary of Anzac Day and the Gallipoli landings as part of the overarching commemoration of the First World War centenary. In advance of the centenary, the Brisbane City Council spent $13.4 million to refurbish the Shrine of Remembrance located in Brisbane's ANZAC Square and $1 million on conservation work on 31 war memorials in suburban Brisbane. On the centenary, over 70 Anzac Day ceremonies were held in the Brisbane area with many others in regional areas.

== An example Anzac Day in Queensland ==
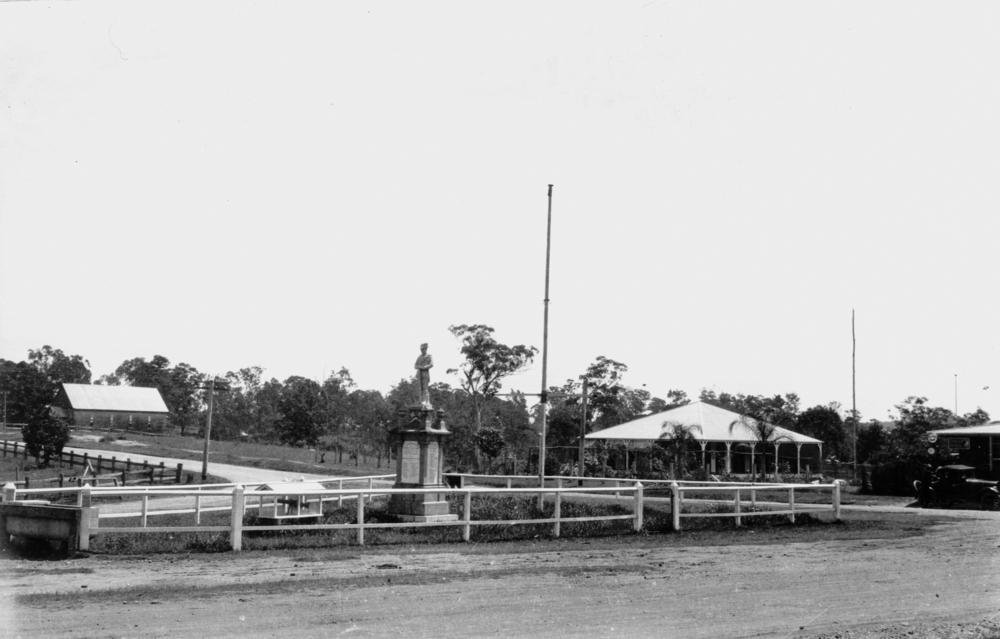
The WWI war memorial at Kenmore ("the Moggill Digger"), 1925

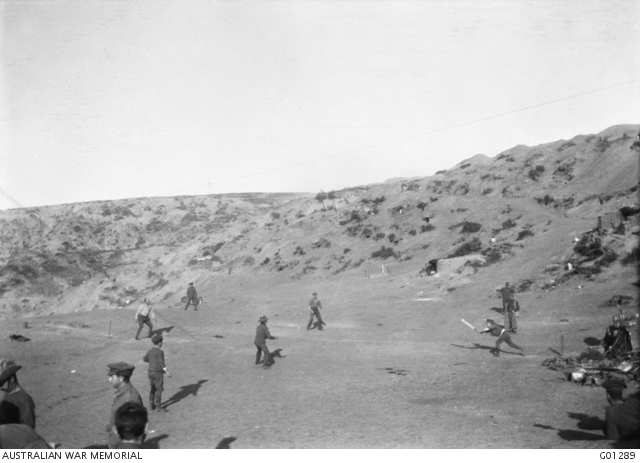
Shell Green cricket match, Gallipoli, 17 December 1915

The program of events for the Anzac Day ceremonies in the western suburbs in Brisbane in 2015 consisted of:

- 5:30 am: dawn service at the Cenotaph at Bellbowrie followed by a "gunfire" breakfast (served with rum)
- 8:15 am: Anzac Day marching parade commencing the corner of Moggill Road and Kenmore Road finishing at the Kenmore war memorial (aka "the Moggill Digger")
- 8:30 am: Anzac Day service at the Kenmore war memorial followed by a morning tea in the Kenmore Shopping Centre
- 10:30am: RSL members and their guests attend a breakfast at the Bellbowrie Tavern
- 10:30am: Anzac Day service at the Fairview Pinjarra Hills War Veteran Home
- 11:30 am: World War I displays at Brookfield District Museum
- 12:30 pm: Light Horse muster followed by a short service at Brookfield Showgrounds
- 1:00 pm: Shell Green 100 Cricket Match between the Australian Army and Brookfield United Cricket Club at the Brookfield Showgrounds, commemorating the cricket match played on Shell Green on the Gallipoli Peninsula on 17 December 1915, whilst shells passed over it, as part of the Anzac attempts to conceal preparations for the evacuation of the Anzac and Suvla Bay sectors
- 5:00 pm: Screening of the movie Gallipoli in the park
