= List of museums in Brisbane =

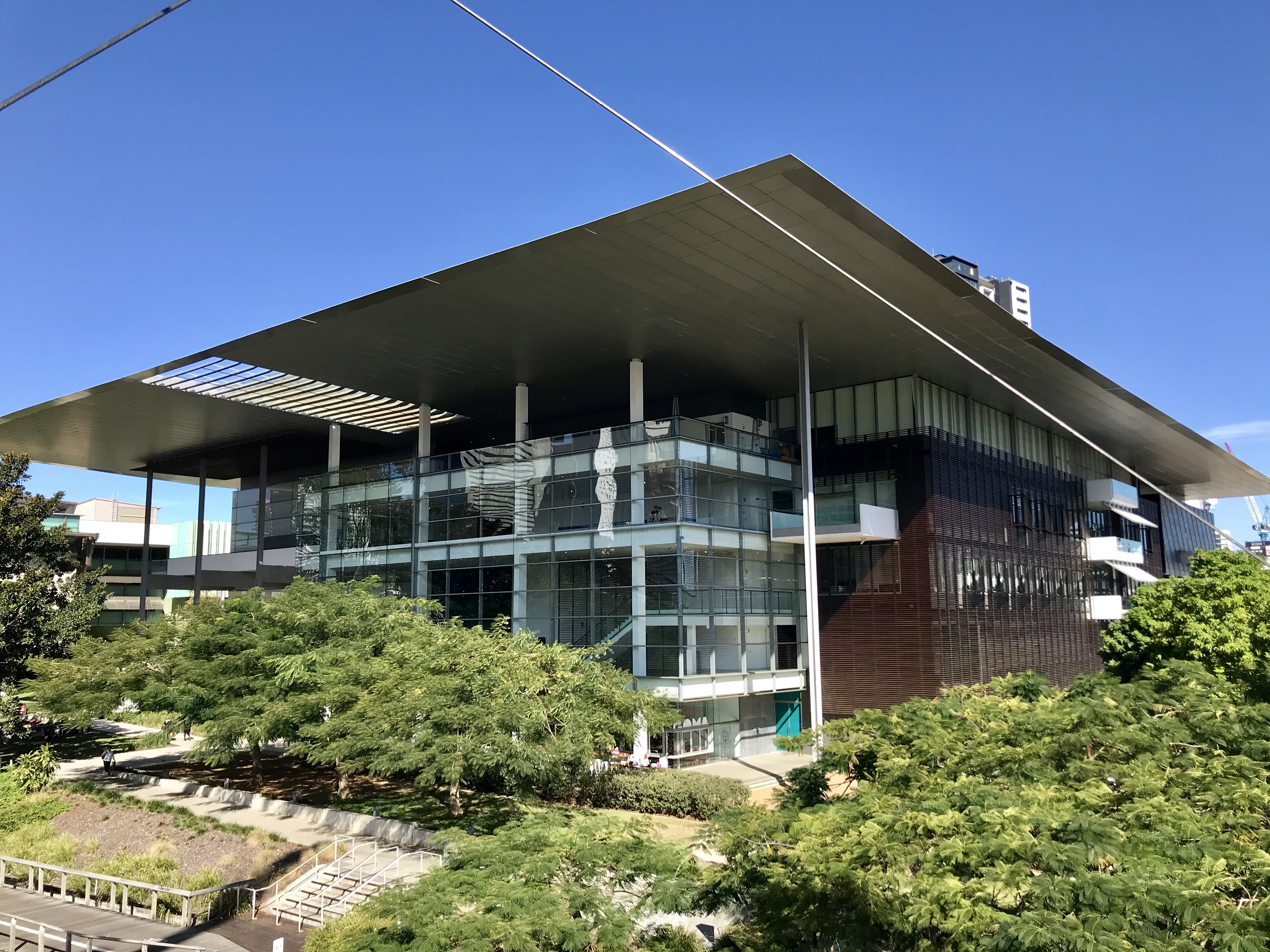
The Gallery of Modern Art is Australia's largest gallery of modern and contemporary art.

The City of Brisbane in Queensland, Australia, is home to a large number of cultural institutions, museums and historic sites, several of which have worldwide acclaim.

Name	Location	Area	Coords	Type	Summary
Abbey Museum of Art and Archaeology	Caboolture	South East	27.0709°S 153.0228°E	Archaeology	Archaeology and art of Ancient Greece, Rome, Egypt, prehistoric era, Medieval and Renaissance periods
Boggo Road Gaol	Dutton Park	Brisbane Suburbs South	27.4951°S 153.0289°E	Former prison	Operated throughout the 19th and 20th centuries.
Brisbane Opal Museum	Windsor	Brisbane Suburbs North	27.4367°S 153.0316°E	Natural history	Brisbane Opal Museum is a unique museum where people can visit and have a tour and find out for why opal was considered so special that it was declared Australia's National Gemstone. There is an opal jewellery shop in the same building. Exhibits impressive opal collection and information about opal mining
Brisbane Tramway Museum	Ferny Grove	Brisbane Suburbs North	27.4072°S 152.9376°E	Transportation	Trams and trolley-buses of Brisbane
Brookfield District Museum	Brookfield	Brisbane Suburbs North	27.4934°S 152.9121°E	Local history	Housed in a former farmhouse and post office relocated from Pullenvale to the Brookfield Showgrounds. Exhibits include collections of local pioneers and the history of the Brookfield Show.
Commissariat Store, Brisbane	Brisbane	Brisbane central	27.4733°S 153.0243°E	History	One of the oldest buildings in Brisbane, operated by the Royal Historical Society of Queensland
Diamantina Health Care Museum	Woolloongabba	Brisbane Suburbs South		Medical	History of healthcare at Princess Alexandra Hospital
Embroiderers Guild, Queensland	Fortitude Valley	Brisbane Suburbs North		Textile	website, embroidery on display from the 18th to 20th centuries from the Middle East, Europe, India, and Australia, exhibits of embroidered textiles of members' work
Fort Lytton Military Museum	Lytton	Brisbane Suburbs South		Military	Located in Fort Lytton National Park, displays about the fort and the military history of Brisbane, exhibits of more general military significance, tours of the fort
Girl Guides Museum of Queensland	Geebung	Brisbane Suburbs North		Scouting	information, history of Girl Guides in Queensland, currently closed
Institute of Modern Art	Fortitude Valley	Brisbane Suburbs North		Art	website, contemporary art exhibits
MacArthur Museum	Brisbane	Brisbane central		History	The building was used as the South West Pacific Area Headquarters from July 1942 to November 1944 and served an important role throughout WW2
Marks-Hirschfeld Museum of Medical History	Herston	Brisbane Suburbs North		Medical	Part of the University of Queensland and located within the heritage-listed Mayne Medical School
Mercy Heritage Centre Brisbane	Brisbane	Brisbane central		History	Social history museum dedicated to the life and works of the Sisters of Mercy
Miegunyah House	Bowen Hills	Brisbane Suburbs North		Historic house	Operated by the Queensland Women's Historical Association, late 19th century period house
Museum of Brisbane	Brisbane	Brisbane central		History	Brisbane's history from the 1820s and culture
Museum of Lands, Mapping and Surveying	Brisbane	Brisbane central		Mapping	Historical maps, survey plans and artefacts
Newstead House	Newstead	Brisbane Suburbs North		Historic house	Late Victorian period house, Brisbane's oldest surviving residence
Nursing Museum, Royal Brisbane Hospital	Herston	Brisbane Suburbs North		Medical	information, 19th-century history of nursing at Royal Brisbane and Women's Hospital
Old Government House	Brisbane	Brisbane central		Historic house	Home of Queensland's governors until 1910, also includes an art gallery with collection of paintings by William Robinson
Queensland Ambulance Museum	Wynnum	Brisbane Suburbs South		Medical	Historic ambulances and equipment, open by appointment
Queensland Art Gallery	South Brisbane	Brisbane Suburbs South		Art	Australian art from settlement to contemporary, European and Asian art
Queensland Fire Museum	Petrie	Brisbane Suburbs North		Firefighting	website
Queensland Gallery of Modern Art	South Brisbane	Brisbane Suburbs South		Art	Contemporary art centre
Queensland Maritime Museum	South Brisbane	Brisbane Suburbs South		Maritime	Queensland's maritime history
Queensland Military Historical Society Museum	Fort Lytton	Brisbane		Military	website, history of Queensland military forces
Queensland Museum	South Brisbane	Brisbane Suburbs South		Multiple	State history, culture, natural history, sustainable living
Queensland Police Museum	Brisbane	Brisbane central		Law enforcement	website, Queensland police force from the 1850s to the present
Queensland Telecommunications Museum	Clayfield	Brisbane Suburbs North		Technology	website, operated by the Postal-Telecommunications Historical Society of Queensland, includes telegraphs, telephones, radio, television
RD Milns Antiquities Museum	St Lucia	Brisbane Suburbs North		Archaeology	website, part of the University of Queensland, classical antiquities from western Asia, Egypt, Greece and Rome
Regimental Museum of 2nd/14th Light Horse	Enoggera	Brisbane Suburbs North		Military	website, located in Enoggera Barracks, history of the 2nd/14th Light Horse Regiment
Sandgate Museum	Sandgate	Brisbane Suburbs North		Local history	website, operated by the Sandgate Historical Society
Sciencenter	South Brisbane	Brisbane Suburbs South		Science	Located on Level 1 of Queensland Museum, hands-on science exhibits
Sir Harry Gibbs Legal Heritage Centre	Brisbane	Brisbane central		Law	Queensland's only legal heritage museum
St Helena Island National Park	St Helena Island	Brisbane Suburbs South		Prison	Tours of the 19th-century prison ruins and a museum
Tony Gould Gallery	South Brisbane	Brisbane Suburbs South		Performing arts	Located at the Queensland Performing Arts Centre, exhibits about theatre, opera, dance and other performing arts
University of Queensland Anthropology Museum	St Lucia	Brisbane Suburbs North		Anthropology	Ethnographic material and visual culture of the Aboriginal people, Pacific peoples, and Africa, South-East Asia and China
University of Queensland Art Museum	St Lucia	Brisbane Suburbs North		Art	Includes works by major Australian artists, Chinese antiquities
University of Queensland Gatton Museum	St Lucia	Brisbane Suburbs North		Education	website, memorabilia of the history of the university
University of Queensland Physics Museum	St Lucia	Brisbane Suburbs North		Science	website, physics instruments, books and memorabilia, located on Level 2 in the Parnell Building
Victoria Barracks Museum	Petrie Terrace	Brisbane Suburbs North		Military	History of the Australian Army's involvement in the Boer War, World War I and World War II
Wolston House	Wacol	Brisbane Suburbs South		Historic house	Operated by the National Trust of Queensland

== See also ==
- Culture of Brisbane
- List of public art in Brisbane
- List of museums in Queensland
- List of museums in Australia
