= Upper Brookfield, Queensland =

Upper Brookfield
- Suburb
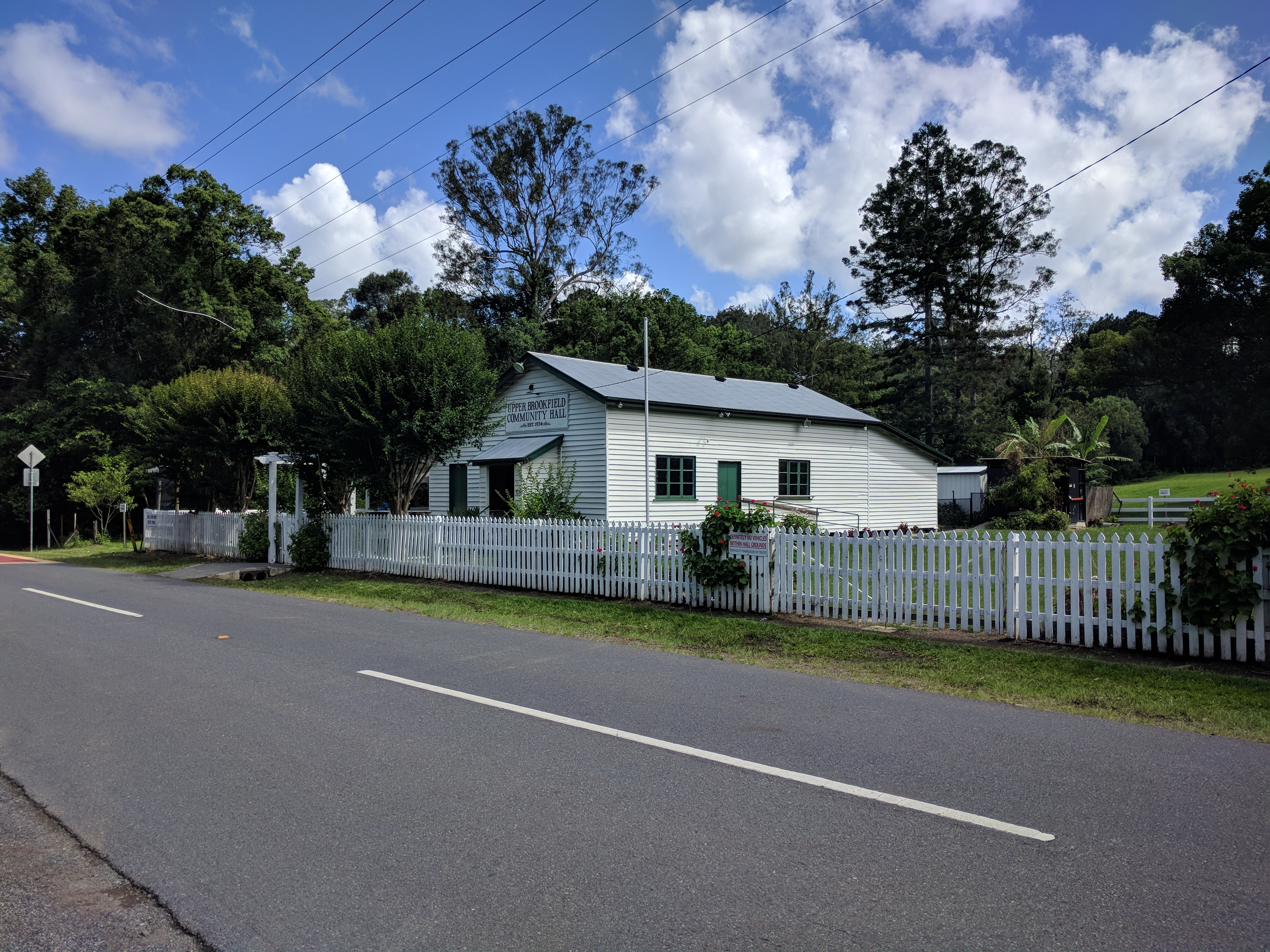
- The Upper Brookfield Community Hall

- Interactive map of Upper Brookfield
- Coordinates: 27.4697°S 152.8530°E
- Country: Australia
- State: Queensland
- City: Brisbane
- LGA: City of Brisbane (Pullenvale Ward)
- Location: 22.5 km (14.0 mi) W of Brisbane CBD

Government
  - State electorate: Moggill
  - Federal division: Ryan

Area
  - Total: 36.5 km^{2} (14.1 sq mi)

Population
  - Total: 857 (2021 census)
  - Density: 23.48/km^{2} (60.81/sq mi)
- Time zone: UTC+10:00 (AEST)
- Postcode: 4069
Suburbs around Upper Brookfield
Lake Manchester	Enoggera Reservoir	Enoggera Reservoir
Lake Manchester	Upper Brookfield	Brookfield
Kholo	Kholo	Pullenvale

Upper Brookfield is an outer western suburb in the City of Brisbane, Queensland, Australia. In the 2021 census, Upper Brookfield had a population of 857 people.

== Geography ==
Upper Brookfield is a mountainous rural suburb consisting of acreage properties. It is 22.5 kilometres (14.0 mi) by road west of the Brisbane CBD.

Moggill Creek rises in the west of the locality and meanders towards the south-east of the locality and into neighbouring Brookfield.

Marshalls Flat is a plain (27.4702°S 152.8469°E) alongside Moggill Creek in the centre of the suburb. It named after husband and wife Arthur John (Jack) Marshall (1913-2003) and Kathleen Bell Marshall (1915-2005), owners and farmer of the flats from 1944 to 1976.

Upper Brookfield Road is the main road through the suburb. It enters the suburb from the south-east (Brookfield) and terminates in the north-west of the locality. It loosely follows Moggill Creek, crossing it on numerous occasions.

There are sections of the D'Aguilar National Park in the north and north-west of the locality. Apart from these protected areas, the land use is predominantly rural residential housing.

== History ==
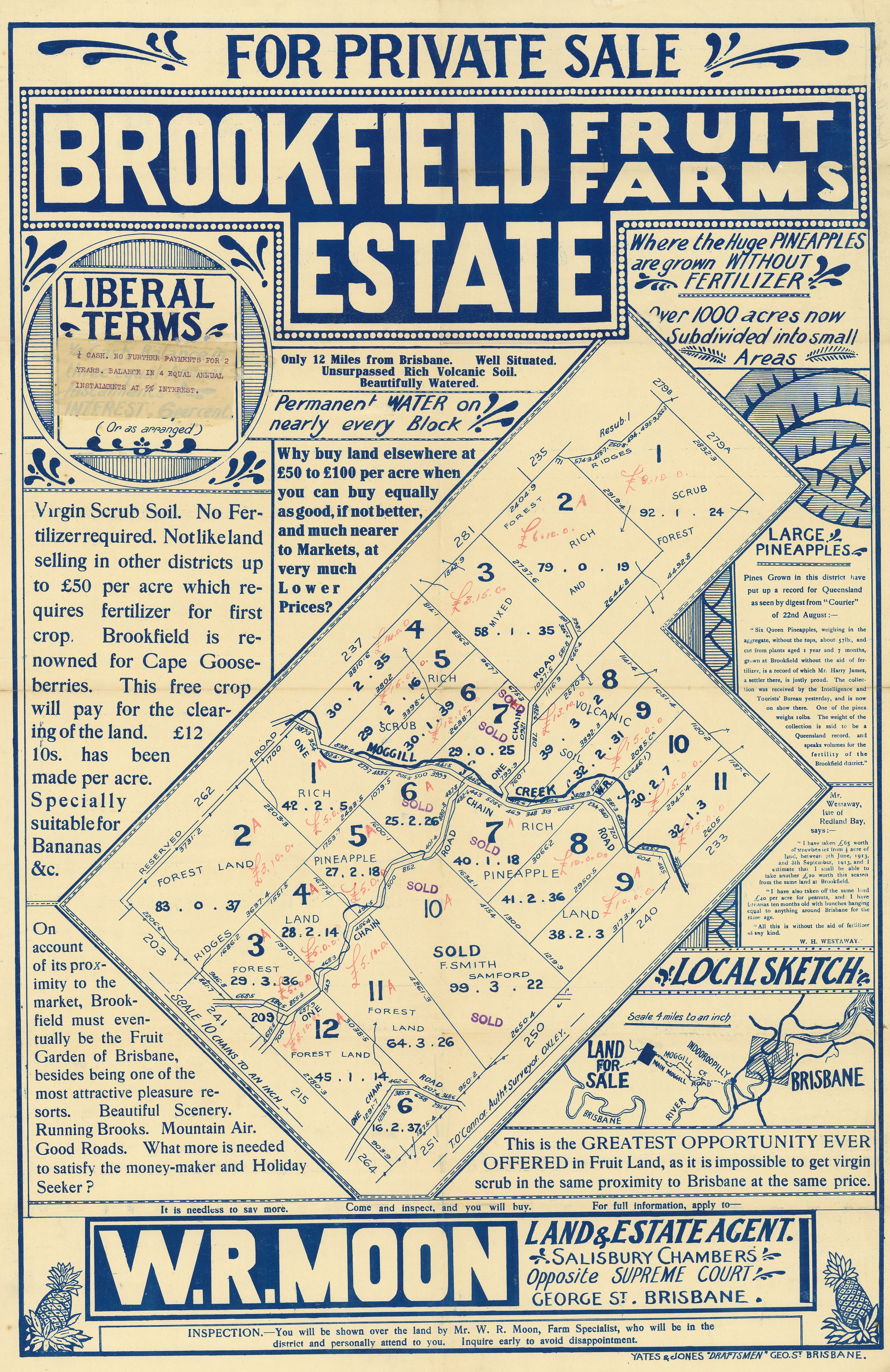
Brookfield Fruit Farms Estate, 1914

Upper Brookfield is named after its neighbouring suburb Brookfield. The name came into use about 1910 but it was not officially named and bounded until 11 August 1975.

In 1914 there was a sale of 23 fruit farm blocks of land in the vicinity of Upper Brookfield Road and its junctions with Kittani Street and Pacey Road (near the Upper Brookfield State School, 27.4782°S 152.8696°E). It was called the Brookfield Fruit Farms Estate and was marketed by W.R. Moon. The land was described as "virgin scrub" suitable for growing bananas, pineapples and vegetables.

Upper Brookfield State School (also known as Brookfield Upper State School) opened in 1916 but closed in 1921 due to low student numbers. It reopened in 1923.

In March 1933, a local resident decided to raise funds to erect a public hall. Fred Meilandt offered to donate the land, while others donated timber and cash. A working bee began clearing the land on 24 June 1933 with construction of the hall commencing in September 1933. The hall was in use by April 1934.

A Methodist church opened in Upper Brookfield on Saturday 29 November 1952. The local congregation had met in other locations for 17 years before establishing their own church. It was ajact to the public hall at 508 Upper Brookfield Road (27.4774°S 152.8681°E). With the amalgamation of the Methodist Church into the Uniting Church in Australia in 1977, it became the Upper Brookfield Uniting Church. It closed in November 2001 and in April 2003 the church building was relocated to the Moreton Bay College in Manly West (operated by the Uniting Church) to become their Centenary Chapel.

== Demographics ==
In the 2011 census, Upper Brookfield had a population of 655 people, 49.6% female and 50.4% male.> The median age of the Upper Brookfield population was 42 years, 5 years above the Australian median. 78.7% of people living in Upper Brookfield were born in Australia, compared to the national average of 69.8%; the next most common countries of birth were England 6%, South Africa 2%, New Zealand 1.8%, Netherlands 1.4%, United States of America 1.1%. 96% of people speak only English at home; the next most common languages were 0.6% Dutch, 0.6% German, 0.5% French, 0.5% Italian, 0.5% Spanish.

In the 2016 census, Upper Brookfield had a population of 785 people. Of these 49.2% were male and 50.8% were female. Aboriginal and/or Torres Strait Islander people made up 0.5% of the population. The median age of people was 42 years. Children aged 0 – 14 years made up 21.9% of the population and people aged 65 years and over made up 14.4% of the population. The most common responses for religion were No Religion, so described 42.1%, Catholic 14.9%, Not stated 13.6%, Anglican 10.3% and Uniting Church 6.1%. In Upper Brookfield (State Suburbs), No Religion, so described was the largest religious group reported overall (49.1%) (this figure excludes not stated responses). The most common countries of birth for male parents were Australia 59.1%, England 9.8%, South Africa 3.3%, New Zealand 2.8% and Netherlands 2.5%. The most common countries of birth for female parents were Australia 60.2%, England 7.9%, South Africa 3.3%, Netherlands 2.8% and New Zealand 1.9%. 87.1% of people only spoke English at home. The only other responses for language spoken at home were German 1.6%, Spanish 0.8%, Dutch 0.5% and Italian 0.4%.

In the 2021 census, Upper Brookfield had a population of 857 people.

== Heritage listings ==
Upper Brookfield has heritage-listed sites, including:

- Gold Creek Reservoir, 693A Gold Creek Road (27.4597°S 152.8788°E)

== Education ==
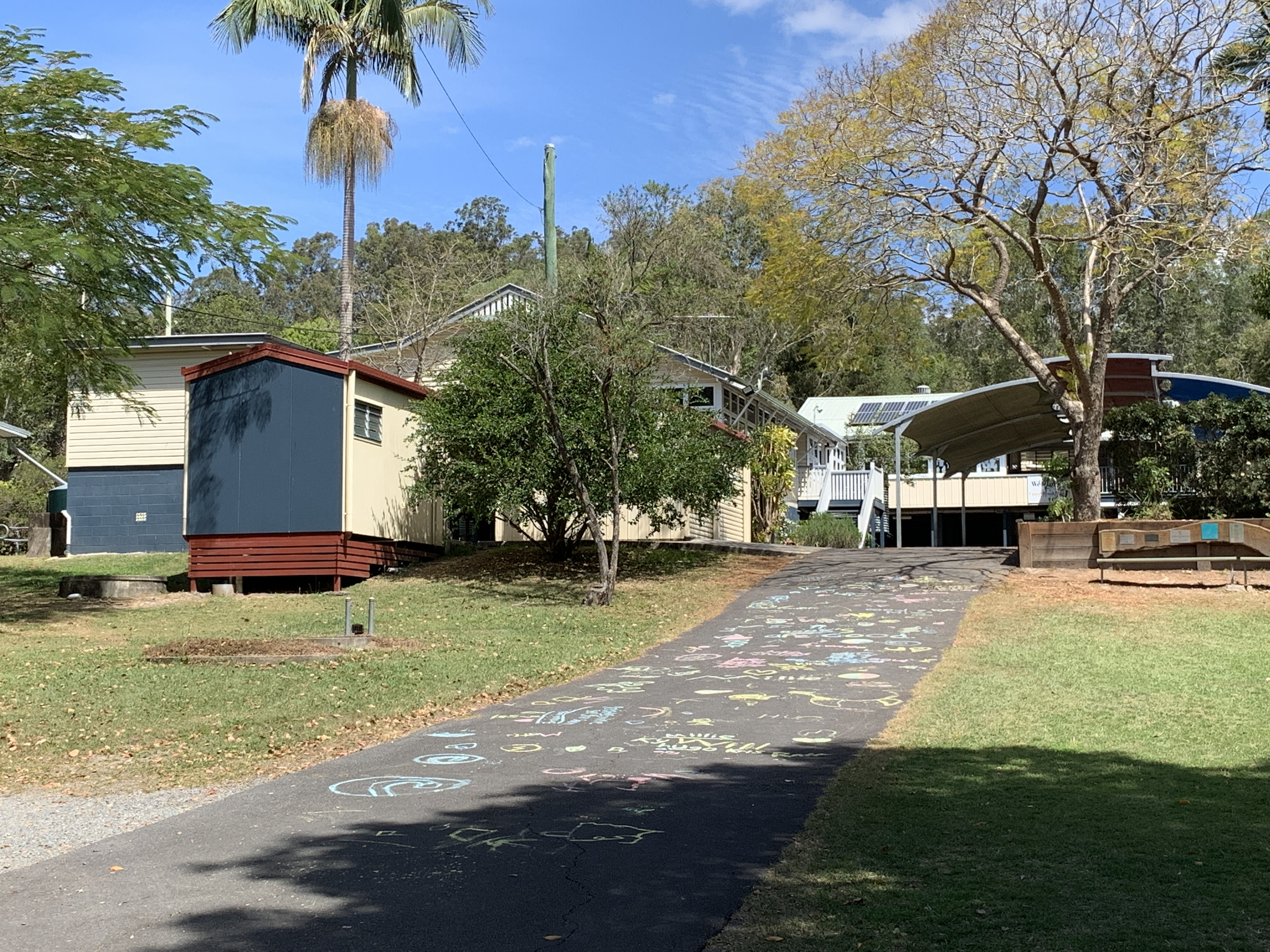
Upper Brookfield State School, 2021

Upper Brookfield State School is a government primary (Prep-6) school for boys and girls at 496 Upper Brookfield Road (27.4780°S 152.8691°E). In 2018, the school had an enrolment of 54 students with 7 teachers (4 full-time equivalent) and 6 non-teaching staff (3 full-time equivalent).

There are no secondary schools in Upper Brookfield. The nearest government secondary school is Kenmore State High School in Kenmore to the south-east.

== Amenities ==
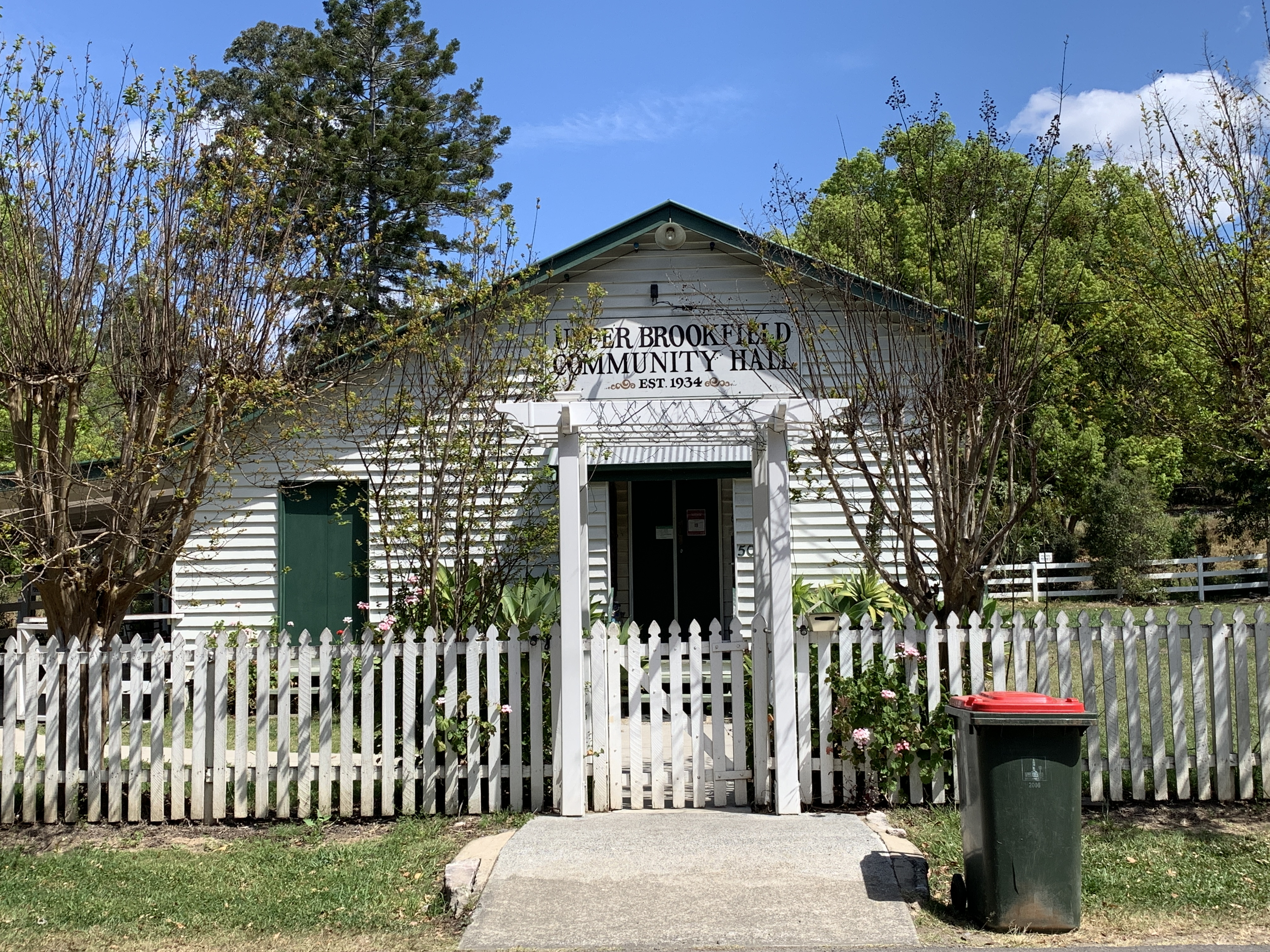
Upper Brookfield Community Hall, 2021

Upper Brookfield Community Hall is at 506 Upper Brookfield Road (27.4775°S 152.8682°E).
