= Kenmore Hills, Queensland =

Kenmore Hills
- Suburb
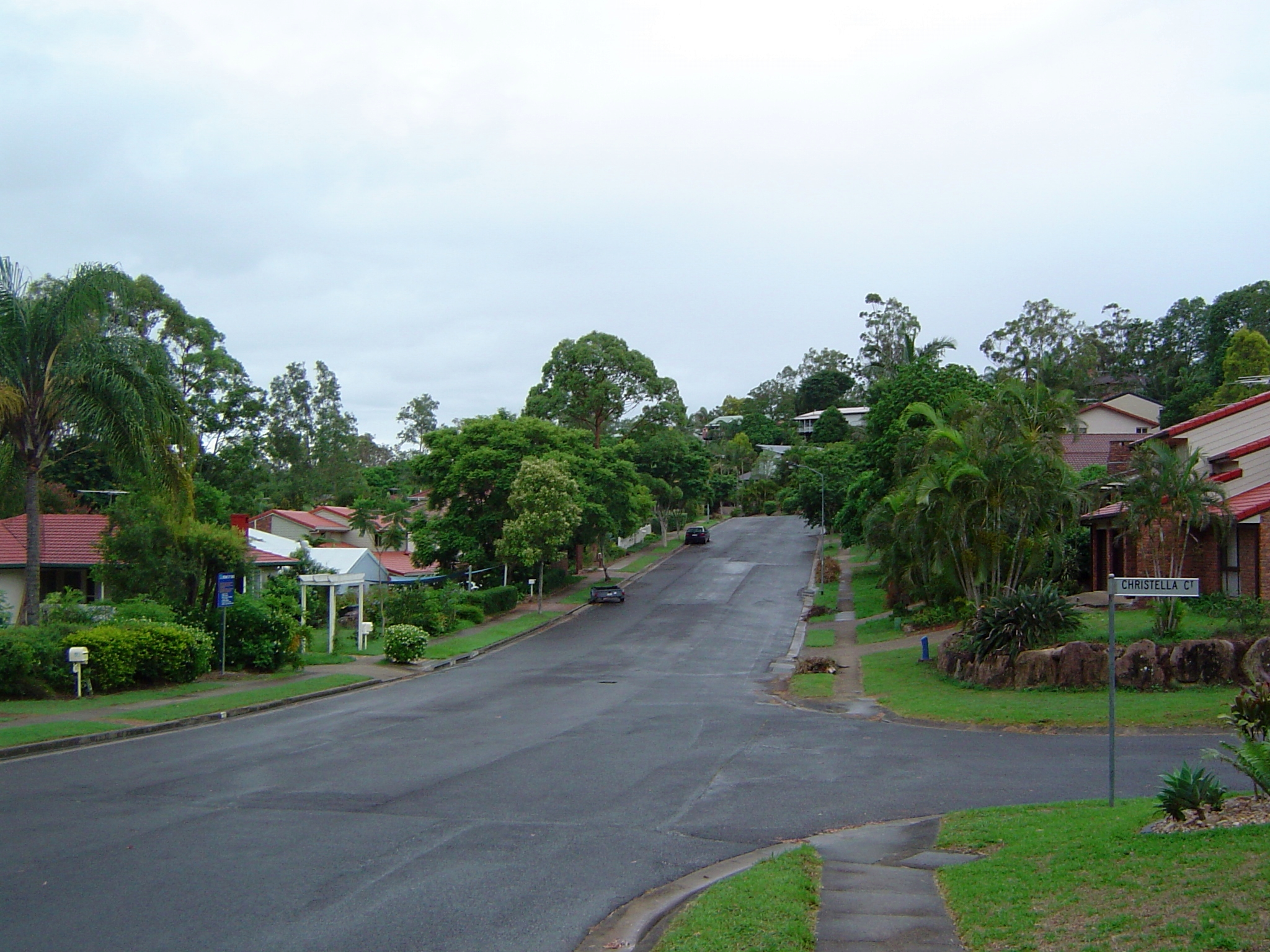
- Mirbelia Street

- Interactive map of Kenmore Hills
- Coordinates: 27.4936°S 152.9294°E
- Country: Australia
- State: Queensland
- City: Brisbane
- LGA: City of Brisbane (Pullenvale Ward)
- Location: 14.6 km (9.1 mi) WSW of Brisbane CBD
- Established: 1975

Government
  - State electorate: Moggill
  - Federal division: Ryan

Area
  - Total: 4.7 km^{2} (1.8 sq mi)

Population
  - Total: 2,448 (2021 census)
  - Density: 521/km^{2} (1,349/sq mi)
- Time zone: UTC+10:00 (AEST)
- Postcode: 4069
Suburbs around Kenmore Hills
Brookfield	Mount Coot-tha	Chapel Hill
Brookfield	Kenmore Hills	Chapel Hill
Brookfield	Kenmore	Kenmore

Kenmore Hills is a suburb in the City of Brisbane, Queensland, Australia. In the 2021 census, Kenmore Hills had a population of 2,448 people.

== Geography ==
Kenmore Hills is 13.0 kilometres (8.1 mi) by road by the Brisbane CBD.

Although the northern part of the suburb is on the foothills of Mount Coot-tha, there is only one named peak in the suburb: Carver Hill in the south-east (27.5005°S 152.9308°E) at 70 metres (230 ft) above sea level.

== History ==
Kenmore Hills originally formed part of Brookfield, but in 1969 the name was changed to Kenmore Hills, based on the neighbouring suburb of Kenmore.

In 1932, Father Robert Bartlett Bates, the rector of All Saints Anglican Church at Wickham Terrace purchased a house at 139 Brookfield Road (27.5004°S 152.9310°E) to establish St John's Home for Aged Men, which subsequently relocated to West Toowong (where it continues to operate as St John's Residential Aged Care Home). On 12 May 1934, the Anglican Church opened St Christopher's Lodge, a home for boys. It was officially opened by James Francis Maxwell, the Member of the Queensland Legislative Assembly for Toowong. It was a farm school which operated until circa 1959. Around this time 18 acres (7.3 ha) of the site was sold to the Presbyterian Church (now the Uniting Church in Australia) to develop an aged care centre. It was subsequently used a friary used by the Society of Saint Francis, a centre for contemplative spirituality and other community purposes. It is listed on the Brisbane Heritage Register. In 2019, the site was sold by the Anglican Church to the Uniting Church on the condition that community could continue to use the site.

== Demographics ==
In the 2011 census, Kenmore Hills had a population of 2,577 people, 53.2% female and 46.8% male. The median age of the Kenmore Hills population was 44 years of age, 7 years above the Australian median. 60.5% of people living in Kenmore Hills were born in Australia, compared to the national average of 69.8%; the next most common countries of birth were England 7.5%, South Africa 4.2%, New Zealand 3%, India 2.4%, Scotland 1.3%. 81.3% of people spoke only English at home; the next most common languages were 1.9% Mandarin, 1.1% German, 1% Cantonese, 0.9% Telugu, 0.8% Afrikaans.

In the 2016 census, Kenmore Hills had a population of 2,402 people.

In the 2021 census, Kenmore Hills had a population of 2,448 people.

== Heritage listings ==
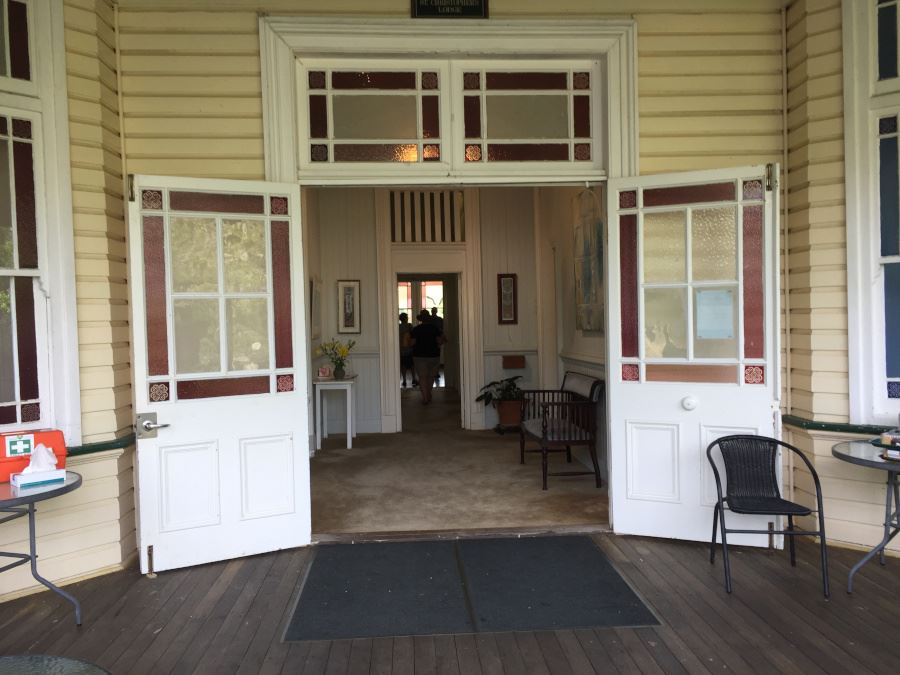
Main entrance of the Old Friary (built 1890), 2021

- Old Friary Complex (also known as Brookfield Centre for Christian Spirituality), 139 Brookfield Road

== Education ==
There are no schools in Kenmore Hills. The nearest government primary schools are Chapel Hill State School in neighbouring Chapel Hill to the east, Kenmore State School in neighbouring Kenmore to the south, and Brookfield State School in neighbouring Brookfield to the west. The nearest government secondary school is Kenmore State High School in Kenmore.
