= Gallery of Modern Art, Brisbane =

Gallery of Modern Art (GOMA)
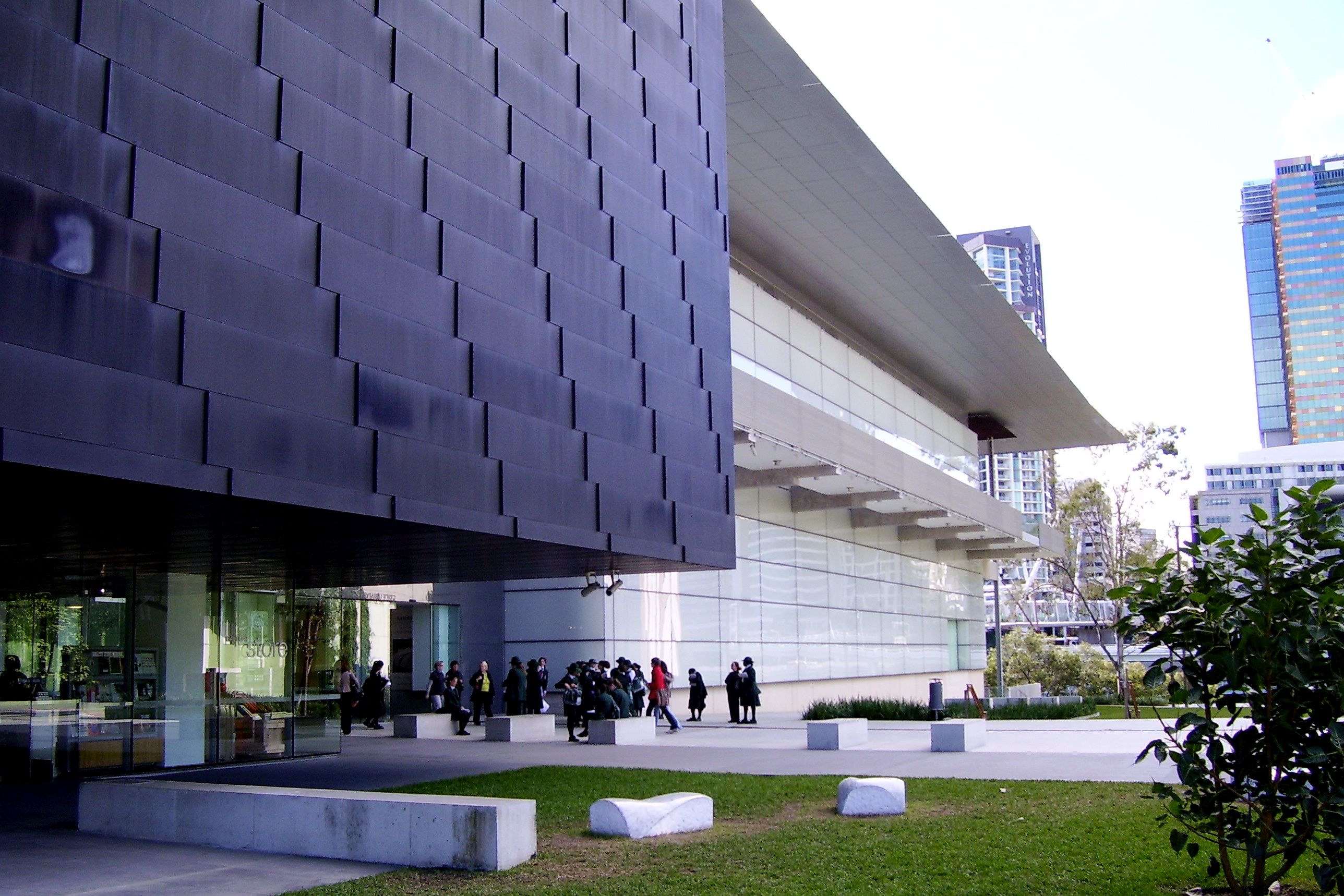
- Main entrance to GOMA.
- Established: December 2006
- Location: Stanley Place, South Brisbane, Brisbane, Queensland, Australia
- Coordinates: 27.470606°S 153.017235°E
- Type: Art museum
- Visitors: 667,657 (2016)
- Director: Chris Saines
- Owner: Government of Queensland
- Public transit access: Bus: Cultural Centre station Train: South Brisbane station
- Website: qagoma.qld.gov.au

The Gallery of Modern Art (GOMA) is an art museum located within the Queensland Cultural Centre in the South Bank precinct of Brisbane, Queensland, Australia. The gallery is part of QAGOMA.

Opened on 2 December 2006, the GOMA is Australia's largest gallery of modern and contemporary art. It also houses the Australian Cinémathèque, the only facility of its kind in an Australian art museum. The gallery is situated on Kurilpa Point next to the Queensland Art Gallery (QAG) building and the State Library of Queensland, and faces the Brisbane River and the CBD.

The GOMA has a total floor area over 25,000 square metres (270,000 sq ft) and the largest exhibition gallery is 1,100 square metres (12,000 sq ft). The building was designed by Sydney architecture firm Architectus.

== Design ==
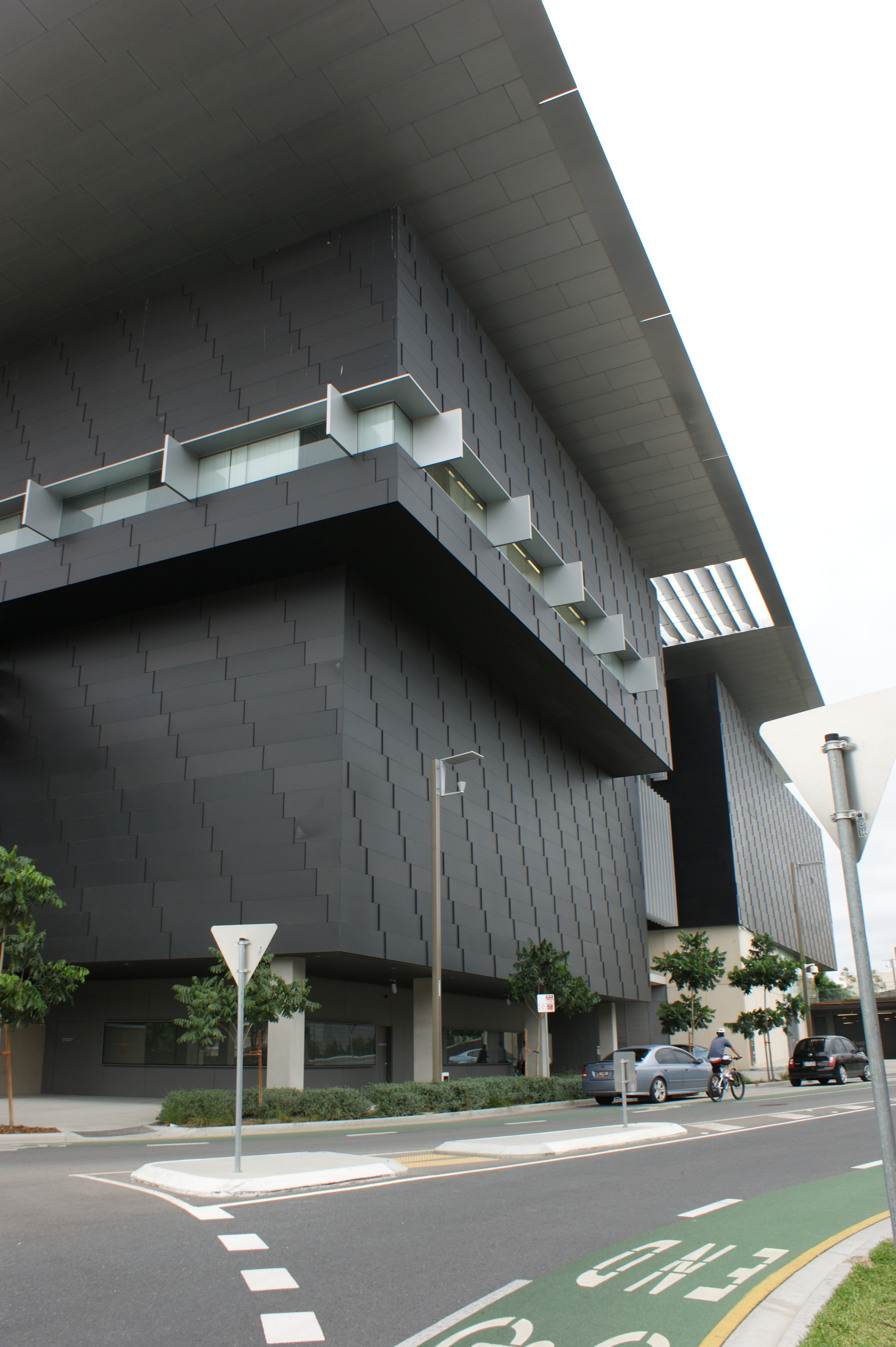
The architecture of GOMA was designed to replicate a "pavilion in the landscape".

In July 2002, Sydney-based company Architectus was commissioned by the Queensland Beattie Government following an Architect Selection Competition, to design the Queensland Art Gallery's second site, the Gallery of Modern Art (GOMA). A main theme of Architectus's design was a pavilion in the landscape, one which assumes its position as both hub and anchor for this important civic precinct. Critical to this is the building's response to the site, its natural topography, existing patterns of urban generation, and the river. Architectus was awarded the 2007 RAIA National Award for Public Architecture for the design of GOMA. The final construction cost was around 107 million dollars.

== Exhibitions ==
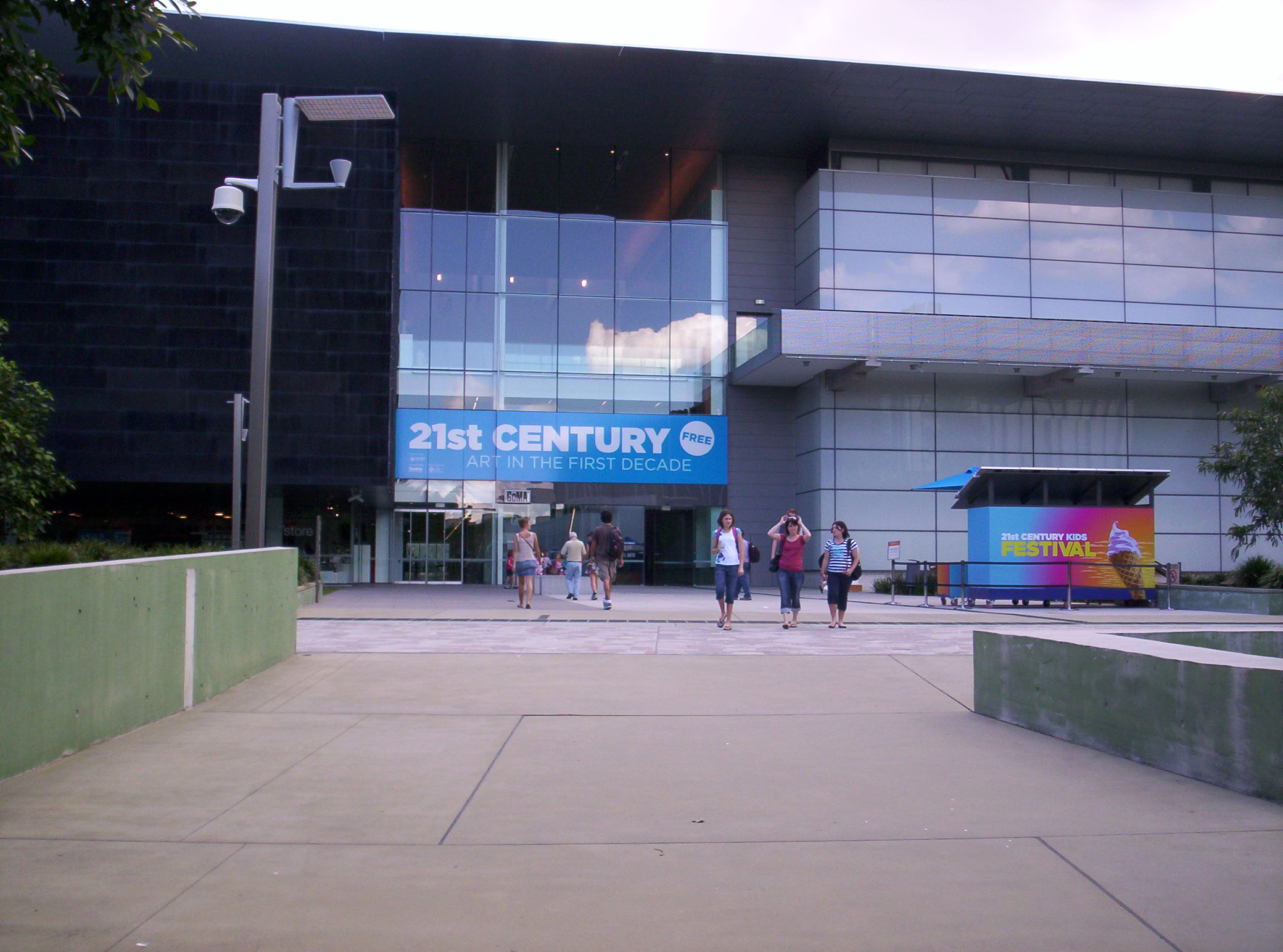
Entrance to GOMA during the exhibition "21st Century: Art in the First Decade"

Past and current exhibitions at GOMA include:

- Fairy Tales (2 December 2023 – 28 April 2024)
- Water (7 December 2019 – 26 April 2020)
- I, Object (3 August 2019 – 29 August 2021)
- Work, Work, Work (3 August 2019 – 19 July 2020)
- Perceptions of Time (25 May 2019 – 28 June 2020)
- Geometries (25 May 2019 – 2 February 2020)
- Quilty (29 June – 13 October 2019)
- Margaret Olley: A Generous Life (15 June – 13 October 2019)
- Patricia Piccinini: Curious Affection (24 March – 5 August 2018)
- Yayoi Kusama: Life is the Heart of a Rainbow (4 November 2017 – 11 February 2018)
- Gerhard Richter: The Life of Images (14 October 2017 – 4 February 2018)
- Marvel: Creating the Cinematic Universe (27 May – 3 September 2017)
- Cindy Sherman (28 May – 3 October 2016)
- David Lynch: Between Two Worlds (14 March – 8 June 2015)
- Future Beauty: 30 Years of Japanese Fashion (1 November 2014 – 15 February 2015)
- Cai Guo-Qiang: Falling Back to Earth (23 November 2013 – 11 May 2014)
- Matisse: Drawing Life (3 December 2011 – 4 March 2012)
- Henri Cartier-Bresson: The Man, The Image & The World (28 August – 27 November 2011)
- Surrealism: The Poetry of Dreams (11 June – 2 October 2011)
- 21st Century: Art in the First Decade (18 December 2010 – 26 April 2011)
- Valentino, Retrospective: Past/Present/Future (7 August – 14 November 2010)
- Ron Mueck (8 May – 1 August 2010)
- The China Project (28 March – 28 June 2009)
- Picasso & his collection (9 June – 14 September 2008)
- Andy Warhol (8 December 2007 – 13 April 2008)

=== Asia Pacific Triennial of Contemporary Art ===
The Gallery of Modern Art (GOMA) hosts the Asia-Pacific Triennial of Contemporary Art jointly with the Queensland Art Gallery (QAG), since opening in 2006.

- The 10th Asia Pacific Triennial of Contemporary Art (APT10) (4 December 2021 – 25 April 2022)
- The 9th Asia Pacific Triennial of Contemporary Art (APT9) (24 November 2018 – 28 April 2019)
- The 8th Asia Pacific Triennial of Contemporary Art (APT8) (21 November 2015 – 10 April 2016)
- The 7th Asia Pacific Triennial of Contemporary Art (APT7) (8 December 2012 – 14 April 2013)
- The 6th Asia Pacific Triennial of Contemporary Art (APT6) (5 December 2009 – 5 April 2010)
- The 5th Asia Pacific Triennial of Contemporary Art (APT5) (2 December 2006 – 27 May 2007)
- The 4th Asia Pacific Triennial of Contemporary Art (APT4) (12 September 2002 – 27 January 2003)
- The 3rd Asia Pacific Triennial of Contemporary Art (APT3) (9 September 1999 – 26 January 2000)
- The 2nd Asia Pacific Triennial of Contemporary Art (APT2) (27 September 1996 – 19 January 1997)
- The 1st Asia Pacific Triennial of Contemporary Art (APT1) (17 September – 5 December 1993)

== Select exhibits ==
- Im Wald (In the Forest), 1990, by Georg Baselitz
- A book from the sky, 1987–91, by Xu Bing
- The cubic structural evolution project, 2004, by Olafur Eliasson
- Best Foot Forward, 2011, by Julia Mage’au Gray
- Untitled, 2006–07, by Anish Kapoor
- Void (#13), 1991–92, by Anish Kapoor
- Two trees on Mary Street ... Amen!, 1975, by Willem de Kooning
- Soul under the moon, 2002, by Yayoi Kusama
- Infinity nets, 2000, by Yayoi Kusama
- The obliteration room, 2002–present, by Yayoi Kusama
- Global groove, 1973, by Nam June Paik
- TV cello, 2000, by Nam June Paik
- Untitled 2007/2008, by Cindy Sherman
- Night Life, 2018, by James Turrell
- With Winds, 1990, by Lee Ufan
- Dropping a Han dynasty urn, 1995, by Ai Weiwei

== See also ==
- List of museums in Brisbane
- Museum of Contemporary Art, Brisbane, located in South Brisbane from 1987 to 1994
