= Moggill Creek =

Moggill
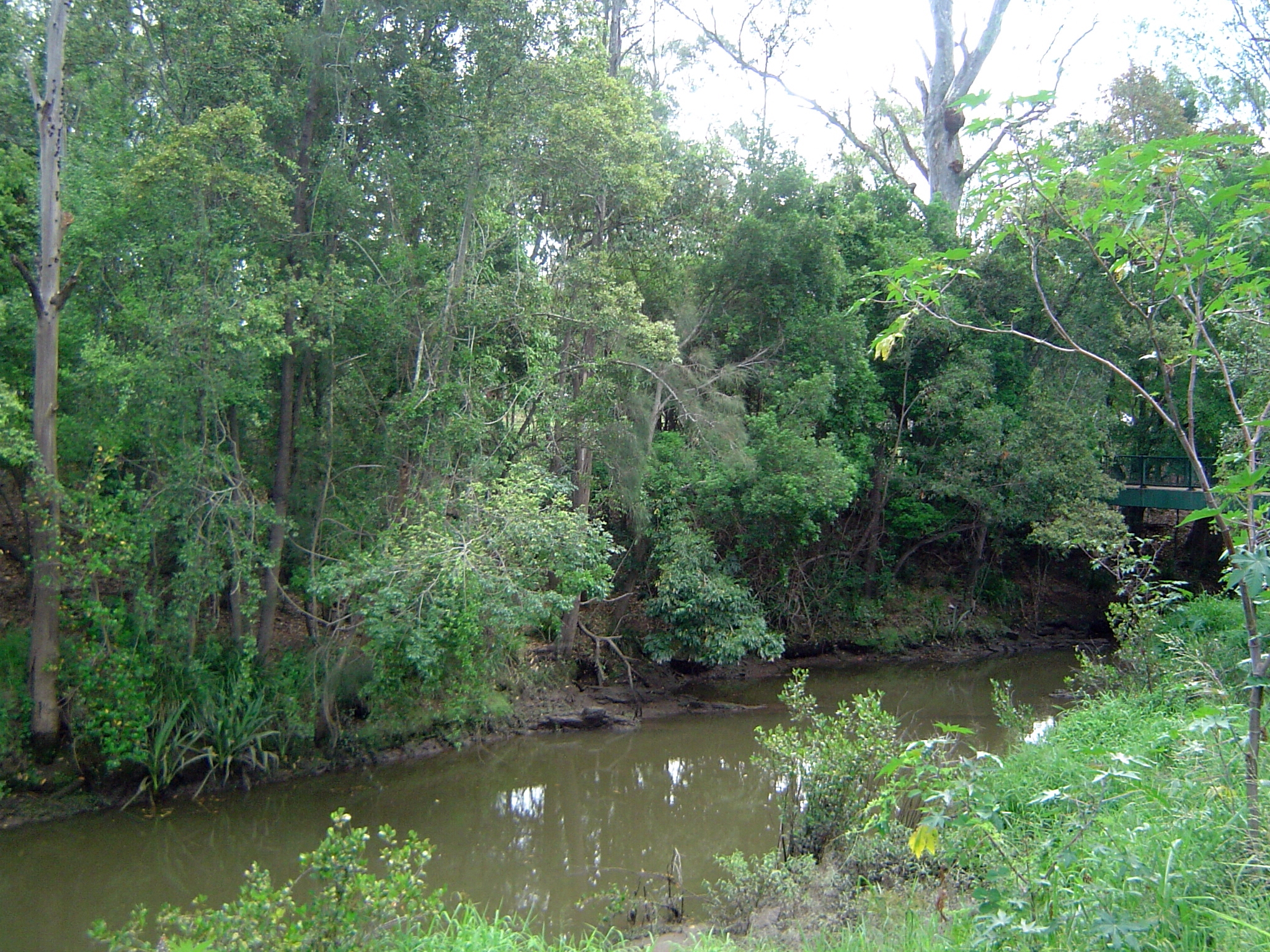
- Rafting Ground Reserve, Kenmore

Location
- Country: Australia
- State: Queensland
- Region: South East Queensland
- City: Brisbane

Physical characteristics
- Mouth: confluence with the Brisbane River
  - location: Kenmore
  - coordinates: 27.529241°S 152.926837°E

Basin features
- River system: Brisbane River

Moggill Creek is a creek in Brisbane, the largest city in Queensland, Australia. The creek rises on the Taylor Range and runs in a south-easterly direction from the southern edge of Brisbane Forest Park in Kholo and Pullenvale, flowing through Upper Brookfield, Brookfield and joining the Brisbane River at Kenmore. Before entering the Brisbane River the creek is crossed by Moggill Road and winds through Rafting Ground Reserve.

Aboriginal naming of Moggil Creek comes from their description of the large water-lizards that were hunted and eaten in the area. They called these lizards, "magil" (moggill) when they were disturbed and jumped into the water.

There are various land uses within the Moggill catchment, including commercial and residential areas, grazing and natural bushland. Moggill Creek is an ephemeral creek: during a period of low rain it may not flow. In contrast to other waterways in the Brisbane area, Moggill Creek is considered to be relatively undisturbed.

Gold Creek is a tributary of Moggill Creek (27.484065°S 152.90298°E). It is dammed by a small reservoir called Gold Creek Dam (27.45945°S 152.8797°E).

The creek is a platypus hotspot with a number of locations along the creek being good places to spot the shy animal. The creek has the most platypus sightings for any Brisbane waterway, followed by Enoggera Creek.

The Moggill Creek catchment has a vast variety of wildlife including koalas, platypus, possums, echidnas, bandicoots, gliders, and the nearly extinct greater glider. Many butterflies and birds can also be spotted in the region. The natural habitat is being restored by the Moggill Creek Catchment Group and the Brisbane City Council Wildlife Conservation Partnership program.

== See also ==
- List of rivers of Australia
