= Shell Green Commonwealth War Graves Commission Cemetery =

WWI CWGC cemetery in Gallipoli, Turkey

Coordinates: 40°13′32″N 26°16′48″E

Shell Green
- Commonwealth War Graves Commission
- Used for those deceased May–December 1915 and 1922–1923
- Established: 1915
- Location: near Gallipoli, Turkey
- Total burials: 429
- Unknowns: 11

Burials by nation
- Allied Powers: Australian: 408; British: 21

Burials by war
- World War I: 409

Shell Green Cemetery is a Commonwealth War Graves Commission Cemetery from World War I in the former Anzac sector of the Gallipoli Peninsula, Turkey for soldiers killed during the Gallipoli campaign. The eight-month campaign was fought by Commonwealth and French forces against Turkish forces in an attempt to force Turkey out of the war, to relieve the deadlock of the Western Front (France/Belgium) and to open a supply route to Russia through the Dardanelles and the Black Sea.

The cemetery is on a former cottonfield at the edge of a steep slope leading from Bolton's Ridge to the sea, near the Southern end of the Anzac sector. The ground was captured by the 8th Australian Infantry Battalion on 25 April 1915 but remained sufficiently near to the front line for the rest of the campaign to suffer frequent Turkish shelling. Two cemeteries for Australian troops were established on the green in May. It continued to be used until December 1915 and the evacuation of the Anzac sector, by which time many of the graves had become elaborately decorated.

A cricket match was played on the green (and photographed) on 17 December 1915, whilst shells passed over it, as part of the Allied attempts to conceal preparations for the evacuation of the Anzac and Suvla Bay sectors.

After the Armistice the cemeteries were combined and 64 graves consolidated into it from four other cemeteries which were closed. Artillery Road and Artillery Road East Cemeteries contained 21 Australians killed between April and May 1915. Artillery Road was the name given to the track which leads from the coast road past Shell Green and up to Brown's Dip. Wright's Gully Cemetery contained the bodies of 8 Australians killed on 28 June 1915 and Eighth Battery Cemetery which contained 7 troops from the 8th Battery, Australian Field Artillery. The graves of 20 British soldiers and sailors who had been killed in 1922 and 1923 were transferred to the cemetery in March 1927.
