= Brookfield Show =

Coordinates: 27.493321°S 152.911985°E

The Brookfield Show is an annual agricultural show held at the Brookfield Showground, Brookfield in Brisbane, Queensland, Australia, in May. It is held for three days over the third weekend in May. The Brookfield Showground is listed on the Brisbane Heritage Register.

== History ==
In 1885, the Queensland Government reserved 1 acre (0.40 ha) of land for a public hall.

In 1897, the Brookfield Pullen Vale and Moggill Farmers' Association was formed at a public meeting held at the Brookfield Hall. In 1905, the association formed a "Show Society" to promote the district and its produce. The first show (a one-day event) was held in 1906, and moved to a two-day format in 1910. The society held its last show in 1926.

In 1953, a public meeting decided to resume the shows with events held in 1954, 1955 and 1956. In 1956, a new Brookfield Show Society was created and has run the annual show ever since.

In 1980, the Show expanded to a 3-day format (Friday, Saturday, Sunday). In 2006 the show attracted a record crowd of almost 22,000 visitors, with numbers averaging around 20,000.

The Show in 2020, scheduled for 15 to 17 May, was cancelled because of the COVID-19 pandemic.

== Entertainment ==
The show includes sideshow alley, roving entertainers, pig races, food stalls, live music and arena entertainment, including a rodeo and fireworks.

== Competitions ==
There are competitions in:

- cookery
- needlework
- woodwork
- talent show
- horticulture
- art
- photography
- poultry
- woodchop
- horses and
- guinea pigs.

== See also ==
- List of festivals in Brisbane
