= Brookfield, Queensland =

Brookfield
- Suburb
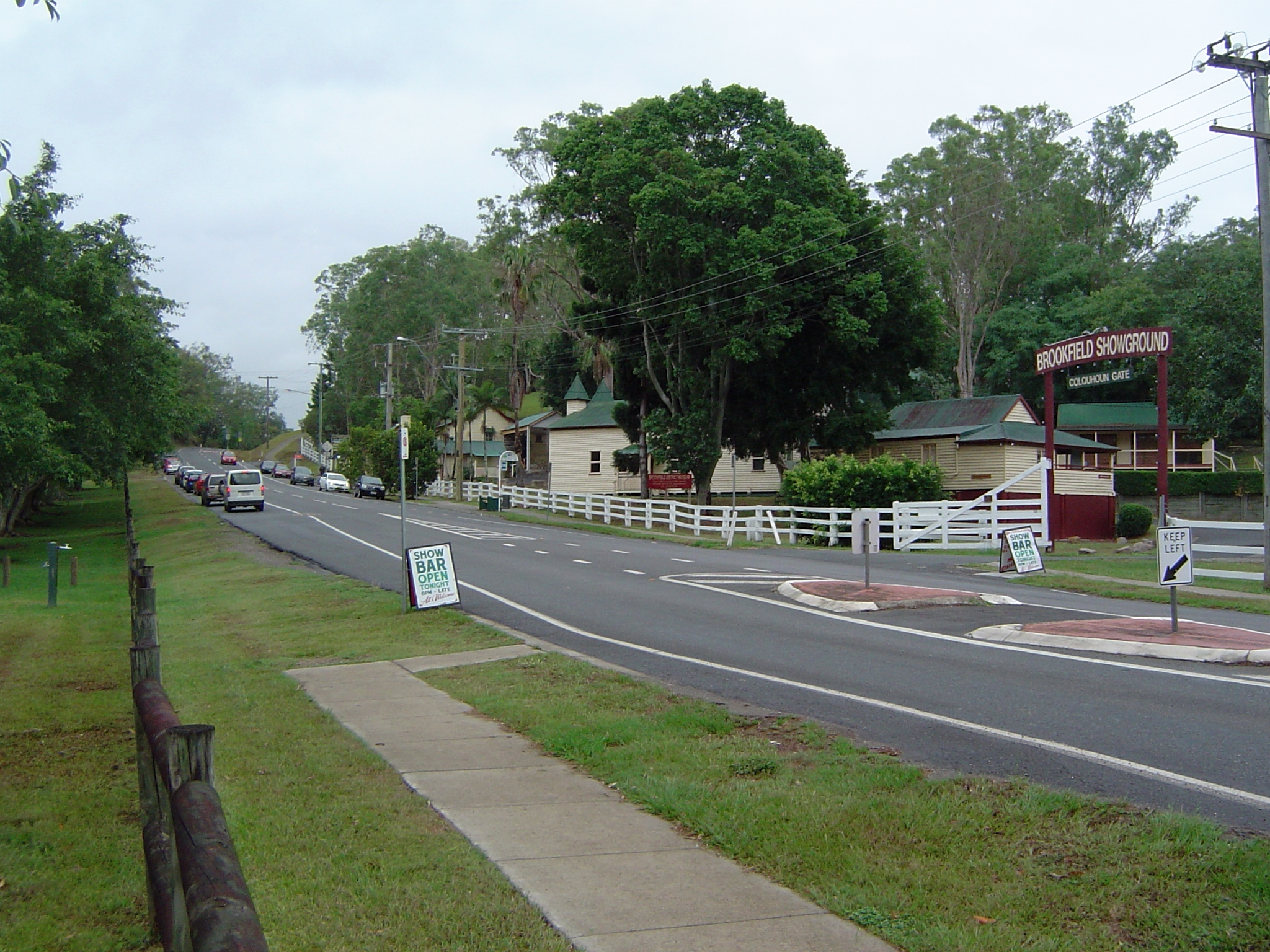
- Brookfield Road, 2012

- Interactive map of Brookfield
- Coordinates: 27.4902°S 152.8958°E
- Country: Australia
- State: Queensland
- City: Brisbane
- LGA: City of Brisbane (Pullenvale Ward)
- Location: 15.4 km (9.6 mi) WSW of Brisbane CBD

Government
  - State electorate: Moggill
  - Federal division: Ryan

Area
  - Total: 20.6 km^{2} (8.0 sq mi)

Population
  - Total: 3,640 (2021 census)
  - Density: 176.7/km^{2} (457.6/sq mi)
- Time zone: UTC+10:00 (AEST)
- Postcode: 4069
Suburbs around Brookfield
Upper Brookfield	Enoggera Reservoir	The Gap
Upper Brookfield	Brookfield	Mount Coot-tha; Kenmore Hills
Pullenvale	Pinjarra Hills	Kenmore

Brookfield is a rural residential suburb in the City of Brisbane, Queensland, Australia. In the 2021 census, Brookfield had a population of 3,640 people.

== Geography ==
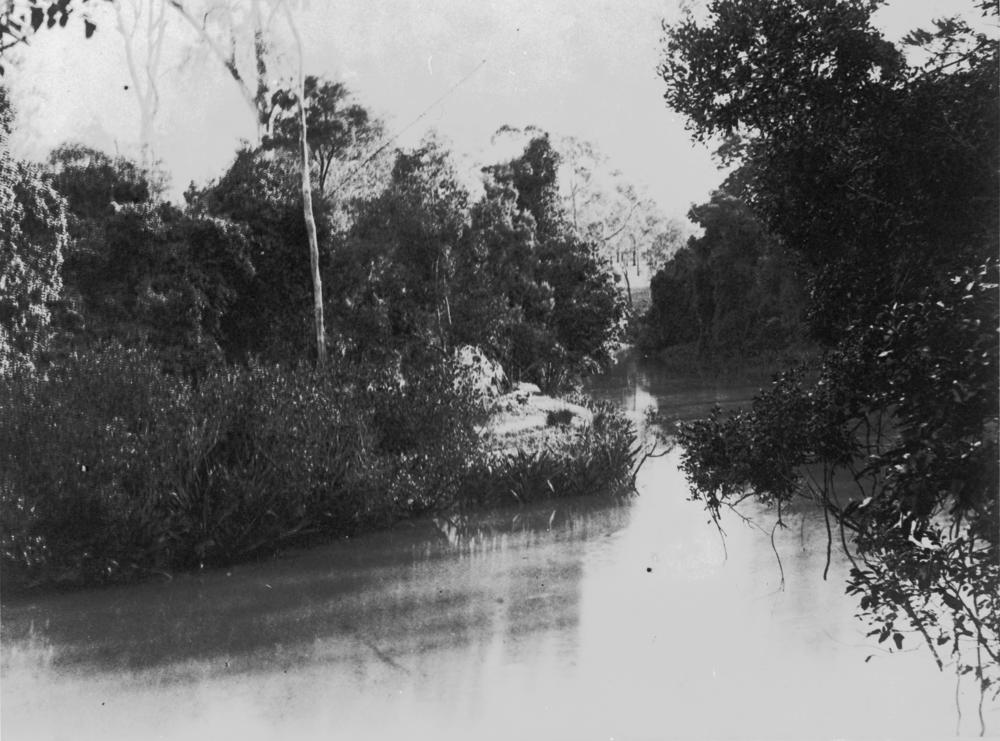
Moggill Creek, 1890 (possibly taken during Field Naturalists' excursion in December 1890)

Brookfield is located approximately 13 kilometres (8.1 mi) west of the Brisbane CBD. Brookfield lies approximately 3 kilometres (1.9 mi) north of the Brisbane River. Moggill Creek flows through Brookfield and joins the Brisbane River at Kenmore.

Brookfield is a rural residential suburb consisting primarily of large acreage properties and luxury homes. Although there are a small number of farms, the vast majority of property is residential.

Moggill Road passes through the southernmost tip of the suburb and Moggill Creek marks part of the suburb's eastern boundary. North of Brookfield are the forested hills and mountains in D'Aguilar National Park.

The centre of Brookfield is on the intersection of Brookfield Road and Boscombe Road. The Brookfield General Store, Brookfield Public Hall, Brookfield Showground, Brookfield Cemetery, Brookfield Recreation Reserve, Anglican Church and Brookfield State School are all in this area. The Brookfield Horse & Pony Club operates out of the showgrounds.

== History ==
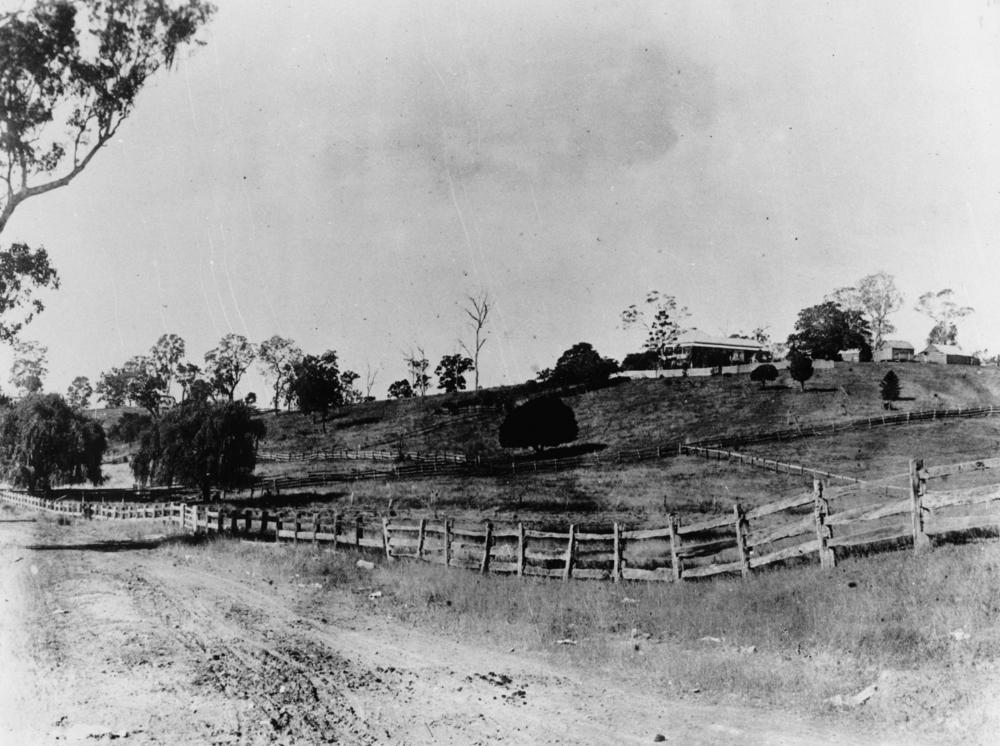
James Brimblecombe's residence 'Fairview' at Brookfield, Brisbane, 1920s

Brookfield is believed to have been named by Lucinda Brimblecombe (née Logan) due to the course of Moggil Creek through the area.

Development in the Brookfield area began in 1869, when the area was opened for logging and farming.

A Bible Christian Church congregation (a denomination of Methodism) was established in 1869. In January 1870 a committee was formed to raise funds to construct a church.

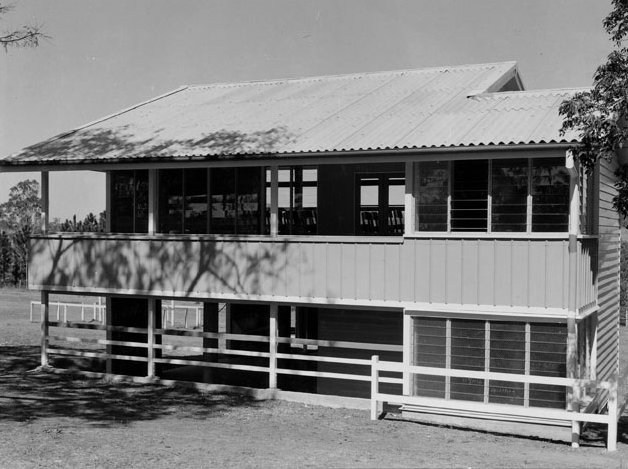
Brookfield State School, 1959

Brookfield State School opened on 27 March 1871 on a 2-acre (0.81 ha) site donated by Mr J. W. Barnett. In 1874, a teacher's residence was built for the school. In 2021, the school celebrated its 150th anniversary. The original school building is still in use.

In 1872, a 19-acre (7.7 ha) site was reserved for recreation.

Brookfield Post Office opened on 12 August 1876, but was downgraded to a receiving office in mid 1914. It was upgraded to a post office in 1919–1920, but closed in March 1924. It opened again in 1947, but closed in 1974.

In 1885, the Queensland Government reserved 1 acre (0.40 ha) of land for a public hall. The Bible Christian church building was relocated to the site to be used as the hall.

Brookfield Cemetery was opened in 1886.

In October 1892, the Anglican parish of Indooroopilly purchased land for a church on the north-east corner of Brookfield Road and Boscombe Road for £20 from the owner, William Thomas Gee. The Church of the Good Shepherd cost £220 to build and was consecrated on Easter Monday 2 April 1893 by Anglican Bishop of Brisbane, William Webber.

The first Brookfield Show was held on Wednesday 20 July 1910.

Gold Creek Provisional School opened in 1919, becoming Gold Creek State School on 1 October 1926. It closed circa 1936. It was located at 528 Gold Creek Road (27.4684°S 152.8918°E).

The town hall was moved from Darra to Brookfield in 1931.

In 1932, the school teacher's residence was too small for a teacher with nine children, so a new building was constructed. The old building was bought by the Brookfield Hall trustees and relocated it where it became the Brookfield General Store.

In 1932 Father Robert Bartlett Bates, the rector of All Saints Anglican Church at Wickham Terrace purchased a house at 139 Brookfield Road to establish St John's Home for Aged Men, which subsequently relocated to West Toowong (where it continues to operate as St John's Residential Aged Care Home). On 12 May 1934 the Anglican Church opened St Christopher's Lodge, a home for boys. It was officially opened by James Francis Maxwell, the Member of the Queensland Legislative Assembly for Toowong. It was a farm school which operated until circa 1959. Around this time, 18 acres (7.3 ha) of the site was sold to the Presbyterian Church (now the Uniting Church in Australia) to develop an aged care centre. It was subsequently used a friary used by the Society of Saint Francis, a centre for contemplative spirituality and other community purposes. It is now within the suburb of Kenmore Hills and is listed on the Brisbane Heritage Register. In 2019 the site was sold by the Anglican Church to the Uniting Church on the condition that community could continue to use the site.

In 1957, Rita O'Hanlan offered riding lessons at the showgrounds, which evolved into the Brookfield Horse and Pony Club.

== Demographics ==
In the 2016 census, Brookfield had a population of 3,524 people. The median age of the Brookfield population was 46 years of age, 8 years above the Australian median. 68.3% of people were born in Australia, compared to the national average of 66.7%; were England 6.7% and South Africa 4.5%. 85.5% of people spoke only English at home. The most common responses for religion were No Religion 26.7%, Catholic 21.5% and Anglican 19.1%.

In the 2021 census, Brookfield had a population of 3,640 people.

== Heritage listings ==
Brookfield has a number of heritage-listed sites, including:

- Brookfield State School, 24 Boscombe Road
- Brookfield General Store & Former Teacher's Residence, 546 Brookfield Road (27.4934°S 152.9127°E)
- Brookfield Public Hall & Showgrounds, 550 Brookfield Road (27.4935°S 152.9121°E)
- Anglican Church of the Good Shepherd, 615 Brookfield Road
- Brookfield Cemetery, 665 Brookfield Road (27.4923°S 152.9109°E)
- The Rafting Ground, 2328 Moggill Road (27.5205°S 152.9233°E)
- Moon Memorial Tree Reserve, 46 Nioka Street (27.5033°S 152.9044°E)
- Brookfield Uniting Church, 2 Upper Brookfield Road
- Gramenz Farmhouse & Dairy, 7 Upper Brookfield Road (27.4936°S 152.9084°E)

== Education ==
Brookfield State School is a government primary (Prep–6) school for boys and girls at 36 Boscombe Road (27.4951°S 152.9135°E). It includes a special education program. In 2017, the school had an enrolment of 506 students with 43 teachers (33 full-time equivalent) and 18 non-teaching staff (13 full-time equivalent).

There are no secondary schools in Brookfield. The nearest government secondary school is Kenmore State High School in neighbouring Kenmore to the south-east.

== Amenities ==
The Anglican Church of the Good Shepherd is at 615 Brookfield Road (corner Boscombe Road, 27.4932°S 152.9143°E).

Brookfield Uniting Church is at 2 Upper Brookfield Road (corner Rafting Ground Road, 27.4950°S 152.9085°E). It is the former Brookfield Methodist Church.

The Brookfield branch of the Queensland Country Women's Association meets at Brookfield Uniting Church hall.

Brookfield Cemetery is still in use and is operated by the Brisbane City Council.

== Events ==
Every year the Brookfield Show is held over three days. The 2006 Brookfield show attracted almost 22,000 visitors. A formal ball is held annually in Brookfield. The 2005 Show Ball had 550 attendees, 2006, 2007 and 2008 attracted 800 people.
