= Kenmore, Queensland =

Kenmore
- Suburb
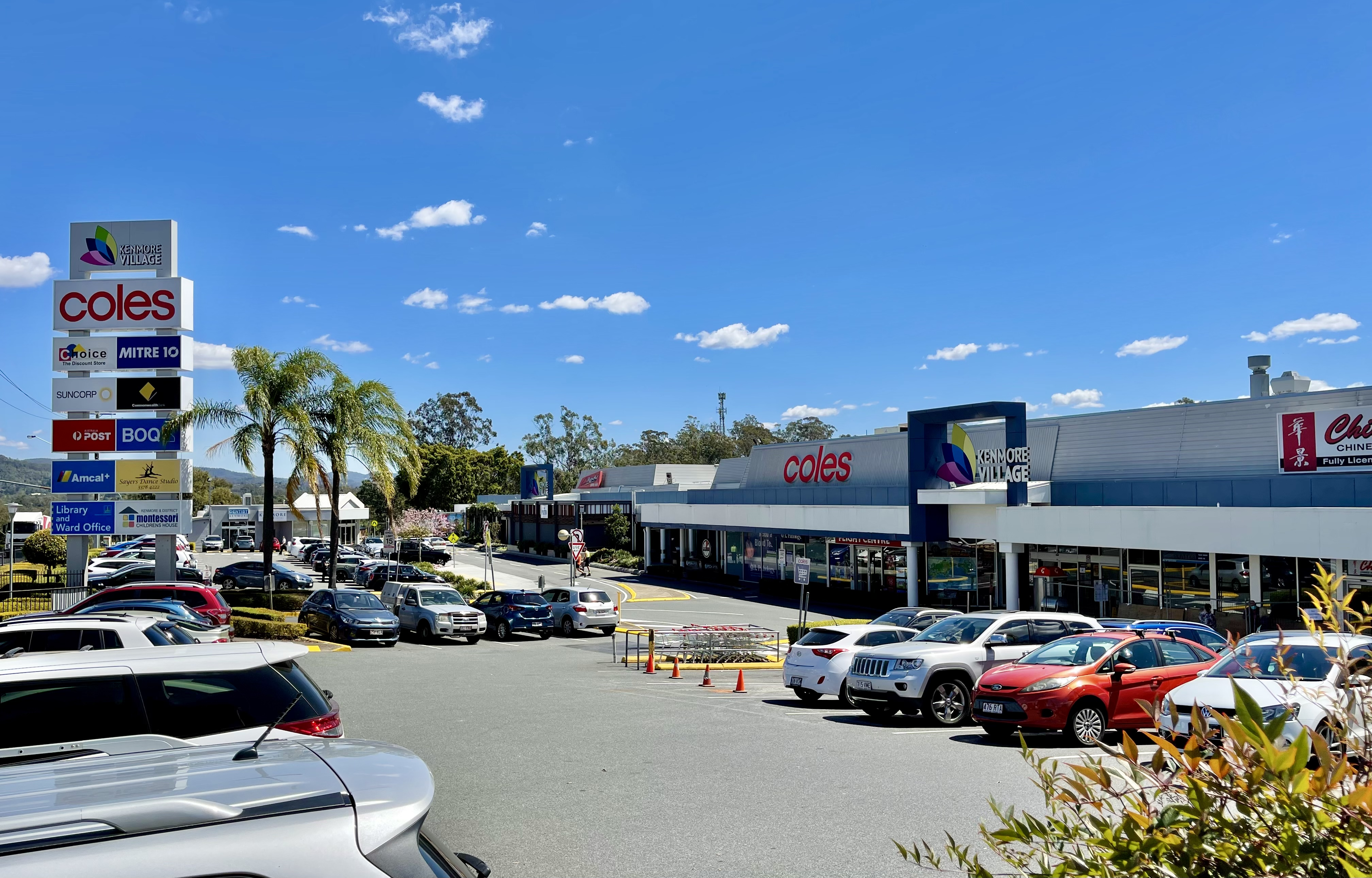
- Kenmore Village shopping centre, 2021

- Interactive map of Kenmore
- Coordinates: 27.5149°S 152.9386°E
- Country: Australia
- State: Queensland
- City: Brisbane
- LGA: City of Brisbane (Pullenvale Ward)
- Location: 13.6 km (8.5 mi) SW of Brisbane CBD

Government
  - State electorate: Moggill
  - Federal division: Ryan

Area
  - Total: 5.8 km^{2} (2.2 sq mi)

Population
  - Total: 9,675 (2021 census)
  - Density: 1,668/km^{2} (4,320/sq mi)
- Time zone: UTC+10:00 (AEST)
- Postcode: 4069
Suburbs around Kenmore
Brookfield	Kenmore Hills	Chapel Hill
Pullenvale	Kenmore	Indooroopilly
Pinjarra Hills	Jindalee	Fig Tree Pocket

Kenmore is a riverside suburb in the City of Brisbane, Queensland, Australia. In the 2021 census, Kenmore had a population of 9,675 people.

== Geography ==
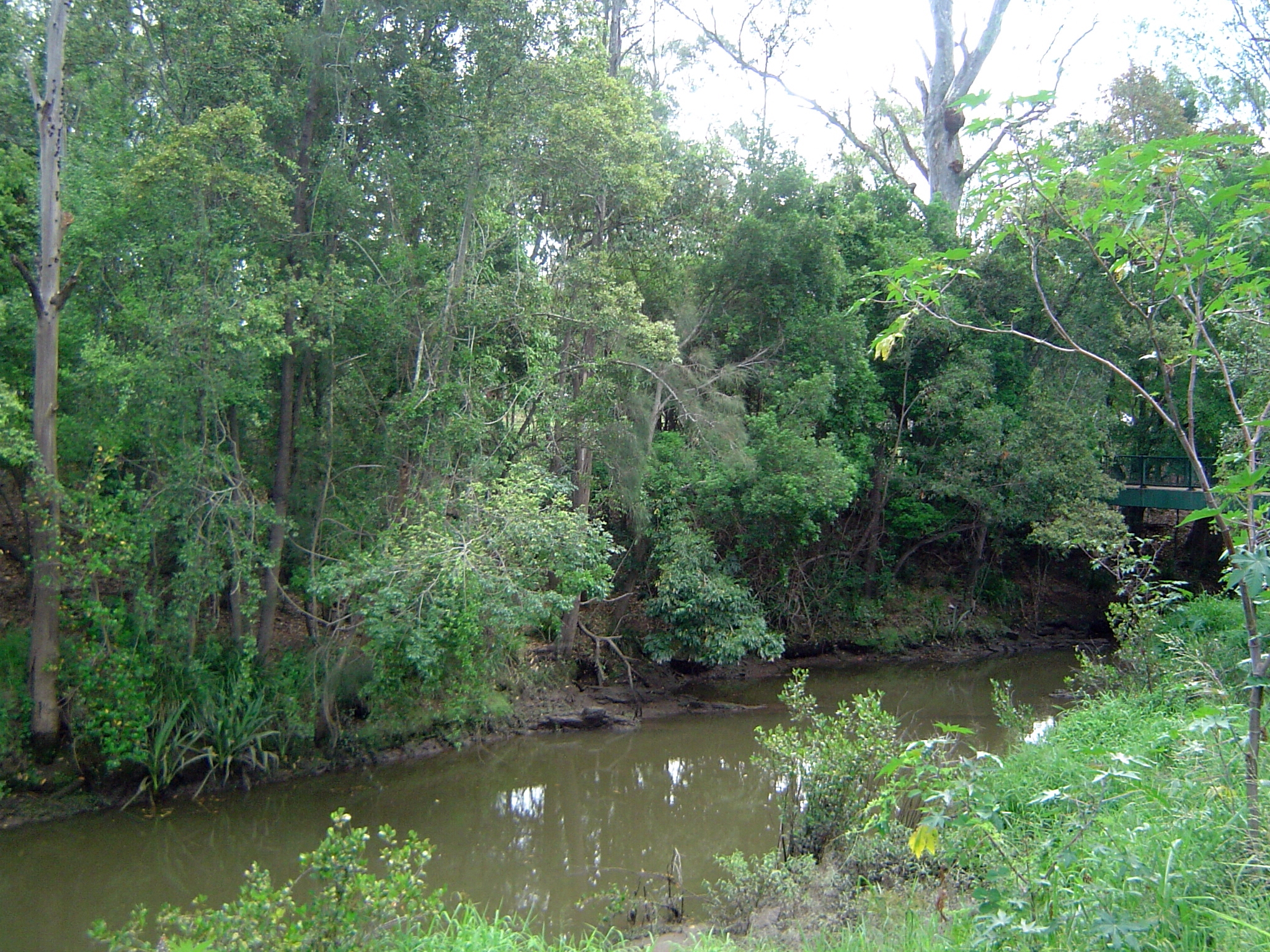
Moggill Creek, 2012

Kenmore is on the Brisbane River 13.6 kilometres (8.5 mi) by road south-west of the Brisbane CBD.

The suburb is bounded to the north-east by Cubberla Creek, to the south-east by the Centenary Highway, to the south by the Brisbane River and to the west by Moggill Creek.

Mosquito Island is a 2.2-hectare (5.4-acre) island in the Brisbane River in the south of the suburb (27.5259°S 152.9395°E), but there is no longer a channel separating it from the mainland. The island is undeveloped.

== History ==
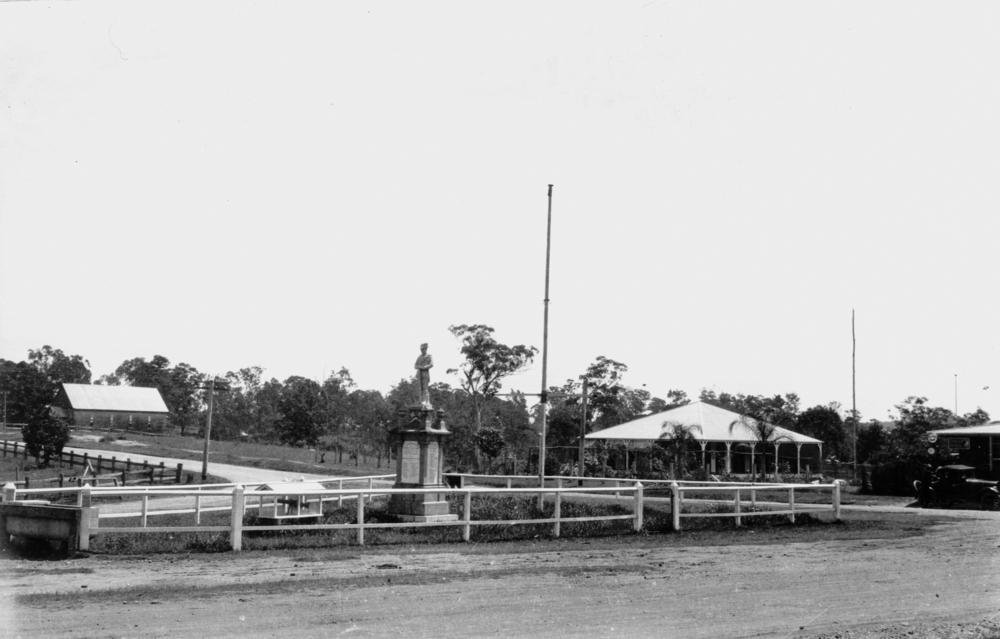
Shire of Moggill War Memorial, at the intersection of Moggill Road and Brookfield Road, Kenmore 1925

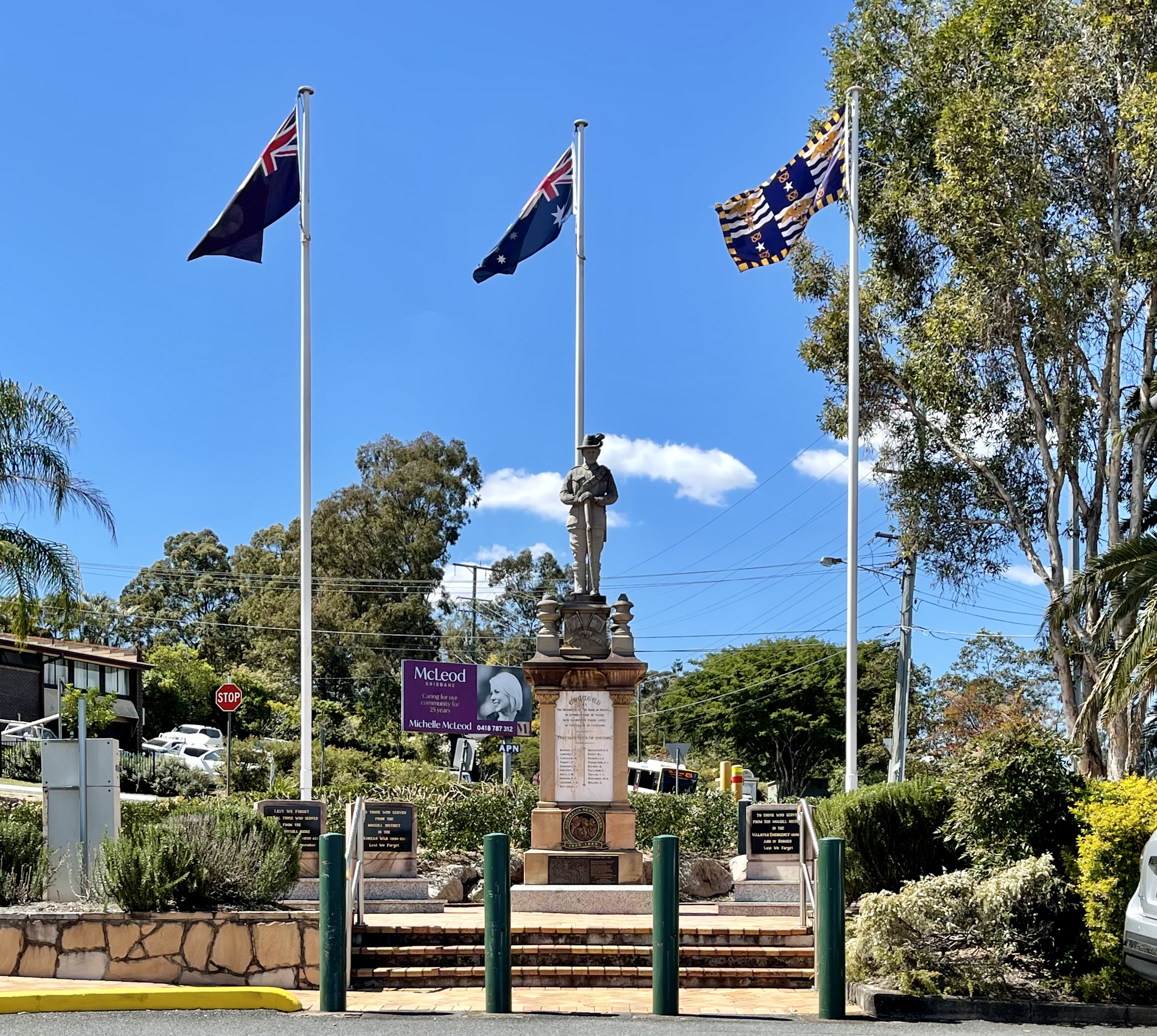
Kenmore War Memorial, 2021

European settlement began in the 1840s and was part of a sheep and cattle run which extended from Milton to Mount Crosby. In the 1850s land was released to new settlers from Britain in 15 to 20 acre lots. During the 1850s and 1860s areas around Kenmore and Brookfield provided Brisbane with timber and there were also small farms producing a variety of crops.

Around 1880 Andrew Todd purchased 100 acres in the centre of what is called Kenmore today.

In the 1890s the Queensland Parliament approved the construction of a rail line from Indooroopilly to Brookfield, running through the southern side of Kenmore following the valley of Cubberla Creek and thence roughly parallel to the present alignment of Kersley Road. However the line was never constructed.

Kenmore Provisional School opened on 9 July 1900. On 1 January 1909, it became Kenmore State School.

In the early 1900s, dairy farming began to be a major farming activity. In 1910 Chinese market gardeners moved in and grew vegetables.

The Kenmore War Memorial was commissioned by the residents of the Shire of Moggill. It was unveiled on 3 July 1920 by General Spencer Browne and Edward Macartney, the Member of the Queensland Legislative Assembly for Toowong. It was originally located on a traffic island in the middle of the intersection of Moggill Road and Brookfield Road, but, due to roadworks in 1969, it was relocated to the Kenmore Village car park. In April 1987, the memorial was restored and moved to a new memorial park called Pike Place adjacent to the shopping centre at 9A Brookfield Road (corner Phillipa Street, 27.5072°S 152.9397°E) in October 1988.

In the early 1950s Hooker's bought dairy farming land around Dumbarton Drive and this began the modern development of Kenmore. In 1960 roads were upgraded.

Our Lady of the Rosary School opened in 1961.

In the 1960s earth works for the village shopping centre began.

Kenmore South State School opened on 23 January 1967.

Brisbane Independent School opened on 19 August 1968; it is now within the suburb boundaries of Pullenvale.

Kenmore State High School opened on 24 January 1972.

In 1972 the ambulance centre opened, in 1975 the fire station opened and in 1978 the police station opened.

Kenmore was one of many Brisbane suburbs partially affected by the 2010–11 Queensland floods.

Kenmore Library opened in 2010 as part of an extension of the Kenmore Village shopping centre.

== Demographics ==
In the 2016 census, Kenmore had a population of 8,960 people.

In the 2021 census, Kenmore had a population of 9,675 people, 51.2% female and 48.8% male. The median age of the Kenmore population was 40. 65.2% of people living in Kenmore were born in Australia, compared to the national average of 66.9%; the next most common countries of birth were England 5.2%, South Africa 3.7%, China 2.9%, New Zealand 2.4%, India 2%. 79.1% of people spoke only English at home; the next most common languages were 4.1% Mandarin, 1.5% Korean,1% Cantonese, 1% Spanish, 0.9% Japanese.

== Heritage listings ==
Kenmore has a number of heritage-listed sites, including:

- Kenmore War Memorial, 9A Brookfield Road
- Kenmore Park homestead, 6 Acworth Street
- former Kenmore Presbyterian Church (also known as Kenmore Uniting Church), 982 Moggill Road

== Education ==
Kenmore State School is a government primary (Prep–6) school for boys and girls at 2052 Moggill Road (27.5087°S 152.9384°E). In 2021, the school had an enrolment of 403 students with 34 teachers and 19 non-teaching staff. The school's ICSEA value is 1136. The school's ICSEA percentile is 93 It includes a special education program.

Kenmore South State School is a government primary (Prep–6) school for boys and girls at 16 Kersley Road (27.5189°S 152.9437°E). In 2021, the school had an enrolment of 712 students with 52 teachers and 31 non-teaching staff. The school's ICSEA value is 1159. The school's ICSEA percentile is 97. It includes a special education program.

Our Lady of the Rosary School is a Catholic primary (Prep–6) school for boys and girls at 1 Kenmore Road (27.5111°S 152.9373°E). In 2021, the school had an enrolment of 390 students with 33 teachers and 24 non-teaching staff .The school's ICSEA value is 1139. The school's ICSEA percentile is 94.

Kenmore State High School is a government secondary (7–12) school for boys and girls at 60 Aberfeldy Street (27.5083°S 152.9296°E). In 2021, the school had an enrolment of 1,967 students with 163 teachers and 57 non-teaching staff. The school's ICSEA value is 1107. The school's ICSEA percentile is 87. It includes a special education program.

== Amenities ==
Kenmore Village Shopping Centre is a shopping mall located on the corner of Moggill Road and Brookfield Road. The shopping centre also has offices.

Kenmore Plaza Shopping Centre is located on Moggill Road opposite Marshall Lane.

The Brisbane City Council operates a public library at the Kenmore Village Shopping Centre on the corner Moggill Road and Brookfield Road.

Kenmore has a number of churches, including:

- Our Lady of the Rosary Catholic Church, 1 Kenmore Road
- Holy Spirit Anglican Church, part of the Kenmore Brookfield Anglican Church, 1036 Moggill Road
- Kenmore Uniting Church, 982 Moggill Road
- Kenmore Church of Christ, 41 Brookfield Road
- Kenmore Presbyterian Church, meets at Kenmore South State School
- Fuel Christian Church, 57a Kenmore Road

== Sports ==
Kenmore has numerous parks and playing fields. It has easy access to outdoors activities in surrounding suburbs, including walking tracks and roads to Mt Coot-tha lookout, Brisbane Botanic Gardens and the planetarium; boating ramps into the Brisbane River and horse riding facilities in Fig Tree Pocket and Brookfield.

It has a variety of sporting venues that are available for use. The largest and easiest to access is Akuna Oval, which has areas for soccer, AFL and rugby, as well as extensive walking tracks throughout the area. Other venues that can be rented are the Kenmore Primary School tennis courts and some facilities at Kenmore South Primary School. Community classes are often held at various areas around Kenmore during term-time and these classes range from yoga to fencing to pilates. There is also a women-only gym, Curves International, on Brookfield Road and a Jett's Gym, on Marshall Lane.

Active sporting groups include Kenmore Australian Football Club, Gem Road Park Soccer Association, Kenmore Lions Football Club and Kenmore Centenary Bears Rugby Union. In October 2012, the Kenmore Football Club merged with the University of Queensland Football Club. The most famous player to come out of Kenmore Bears Rugby Union would be Nathan McCarthy. He would go on to play Colts 4 for the University of Queensland.

== Community groups ==
Kenmore is dissected by Moggill Creek. The Moggill Creek Catchment Group organises working bees to rid the creek area of rubbish and introduced plant species, which are not suited to the area.

The Rotary Club of Kenmore is non-political, non-denominational and open to all cultures, races and creeds.

The Kenmore branch of the Queensland Country Women's Association meets at the Kenmore Library at the Kenmore Village shopping centre at 9 Brookfield Road.

The Kenmore and District Historical Society researches the local history of Kenmore and the surrounding area.

== Transport ==
Kenmore is well connected to the city and the University of Queensland by road and bus.

The main road through Kenmore is Moggill Road. The retail centre of Kenmore is clustered around the roundabout where Brookfield and Moggill Roads intersect. Another transport hub is at the Kenmore Tavern complex, on the corner of Marshall Lane and Moggill Road.

A motorway extension known as the Kenmore Bypass has been proposed, to alleviate congestion along Moggill Road during peak commuting hours, but has met widespread opposition from local residents because of the inevitable resumption of residential properties, loss of amenity and disruption associated with building a major new road through an established residential area.

There is no rail station in Kenmore; Indooroopilly railway station is the closest station.

== Notable people ==
- Bernard Fanning (born 1969), musician
- David McCormack (born 1968), musician
- Geoffrey Rush (born 1951), actor
- Sigrid Thornton (born 1959), actress
