= Mount Coot-tha Forest =

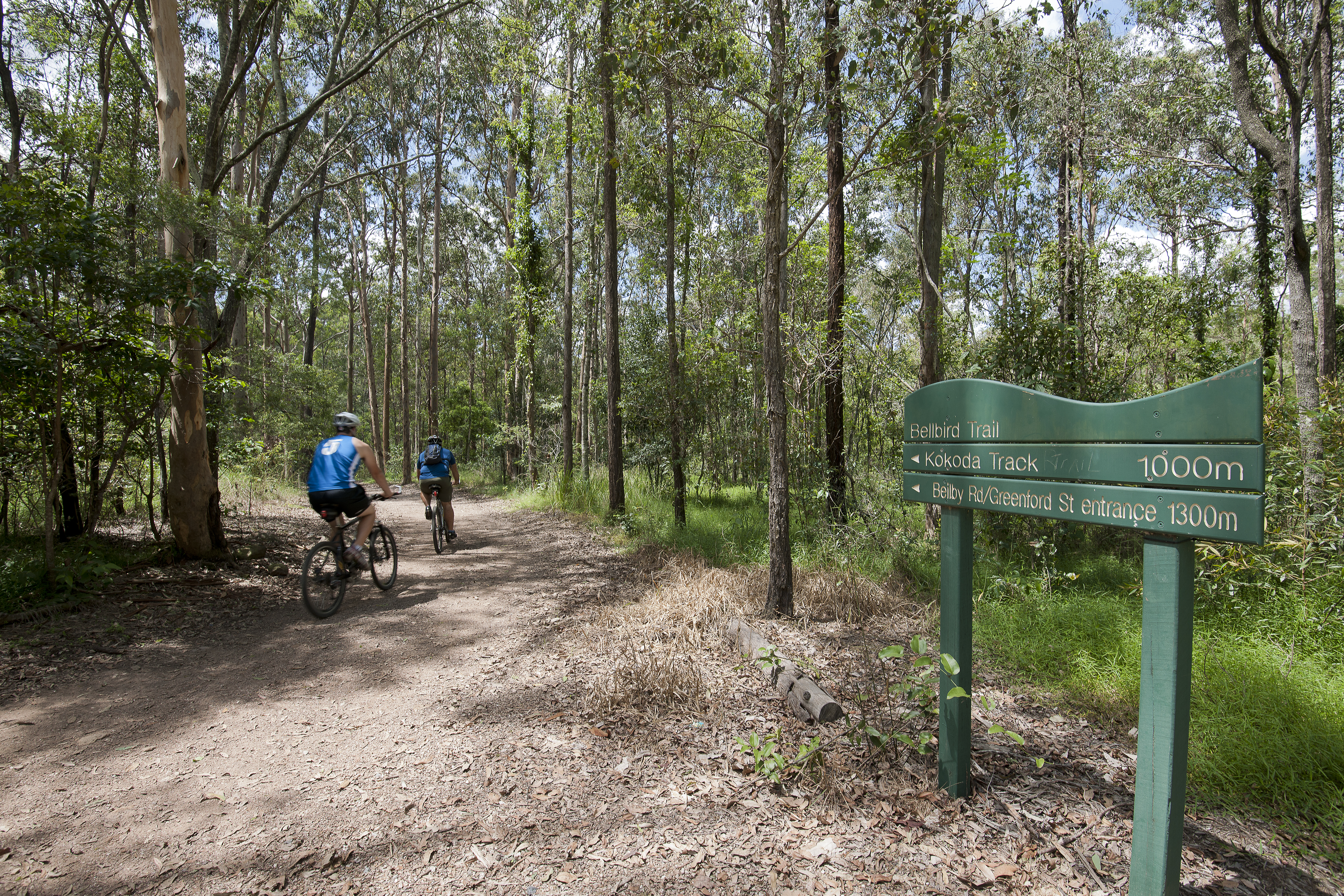
- Mt Coot-tha Forest, 2012

- Location within Queensland Location within Australia
- 27.4765°S 152.9522°E
- Location: Sir Samuel Griffith Drive, Mount Coot-tha, City of Brisbane, Queensland, Australia

Queensland Heritage Register
- Official name: Mount Coot-tha Forest, Mount Coot-tha Reserve
- Type: state heritage (landscape)
- Designated: 4 September 2007
- Reference no.: 602446
- Significant period: 1870s

Mount Coot-tha Forest is a heritage-listed forest reserve at Sir Samuel Griffith Drive, Mount Coot-tha, City of Brisbane, Queensland, Australia. It is also known as Mount Coot-tha Reserve. It was added to the Queensland Heritage Register on 4 September 2007.

The area now known as Mount Coot-tha Forest lies on the slopes of Mount Coot-tha, which was originally known as One Tree Hill. The name dated from 1839, when government surveyor James Warner cleared the summit while establishing a trigonometric survey station, leaving a single prominent tree standing as a landmark visible from the surrounding district. The surrounding forest later became an important timber reserve, proclaimed in 1873 to supply wood for railway construction in Queensland. During the early 1880s the reserve began to be managed for public recreation with the adopted name of Mount Coot-tha, an Indigenous name commonly interpreted as meaning “place of honey,” referring to the native stingless bees traditionally collected in the area.

Since at least the 1920s, Mount Coot‑tha Forest has been associated with tragic incidents, including documented cases of murder and suicide. In Australian folklore, Mount Coot‑tha Forest has also long been reported in local accounts as a place of paranormal phenomena and cryptids, including ghosts, shadow figures, the yarri, and yowies. At the foot of Mount Coot‑tha is the Toowong Cemetery, Queensland’s largest necropolis and among the largest in Australia.

Mount Coot-tha Forest includes more than 70 walking and hiking trails as well as over 50 routes designated for mountain biking. The reserve covers approximately 1,600 hectares of bushland, providing a wide range of tracks that vary in length and difficulty. Several popular tracks connect to nearby attractions such as the Mount Coot-tha Lookout and the Brisbane Botanic Gardens. The forest also has a number of points of interest including, Simpson Falls, J C Slaughter Falls, and the Ghost Hole mine.

== History ==
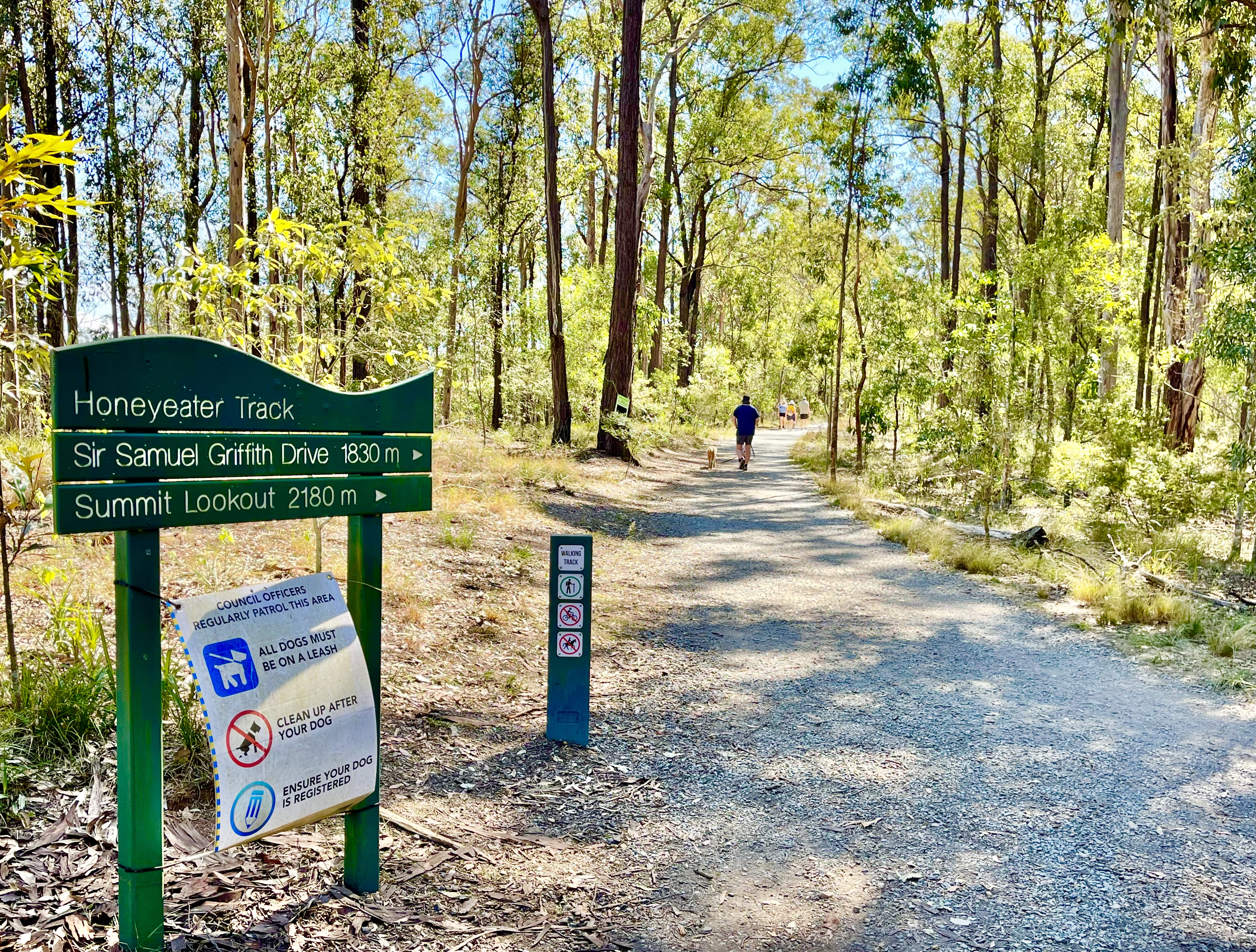
Honeyeater Track entrance, 2021

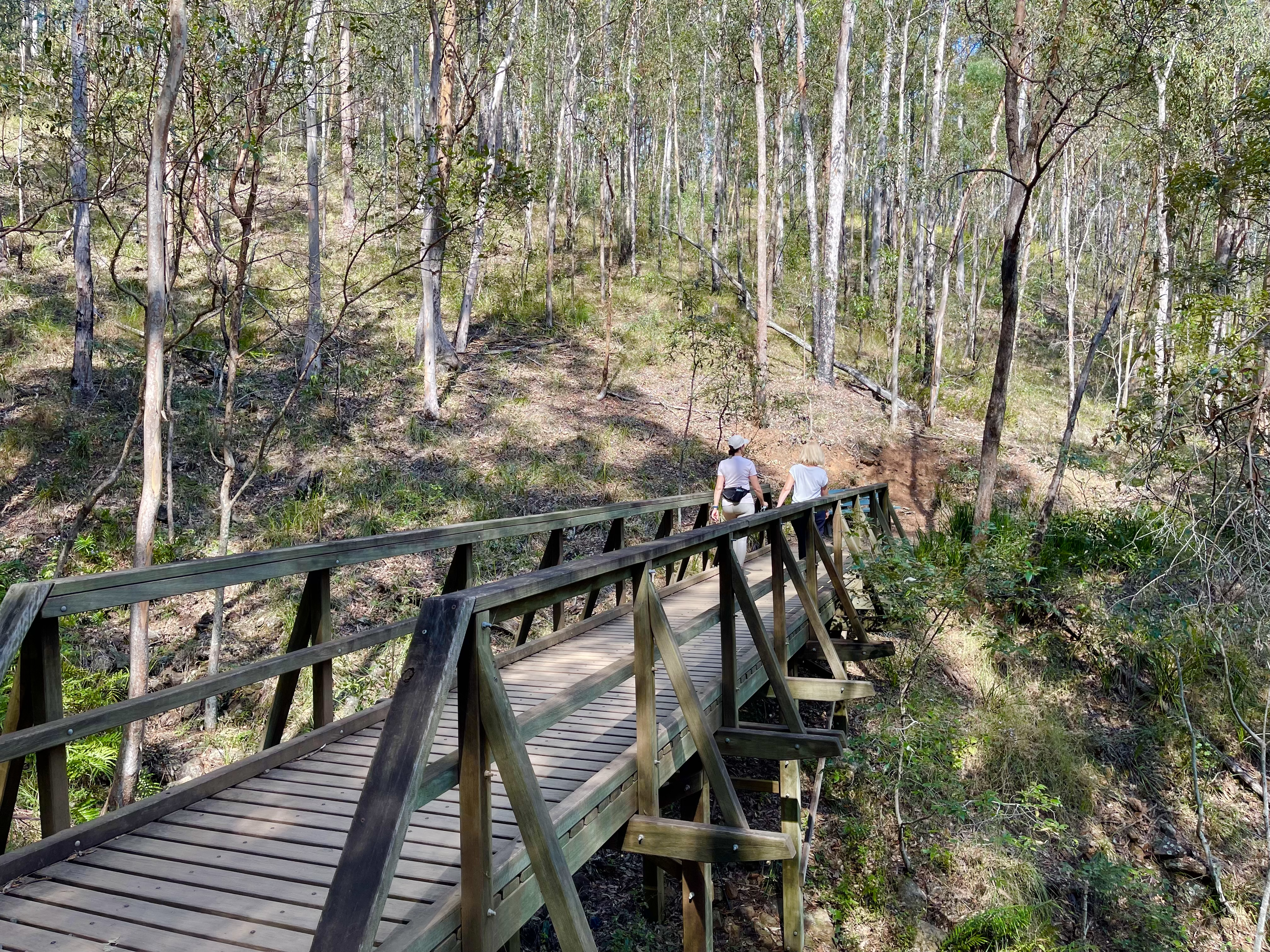
Honeyeater Track Bridge, 2021

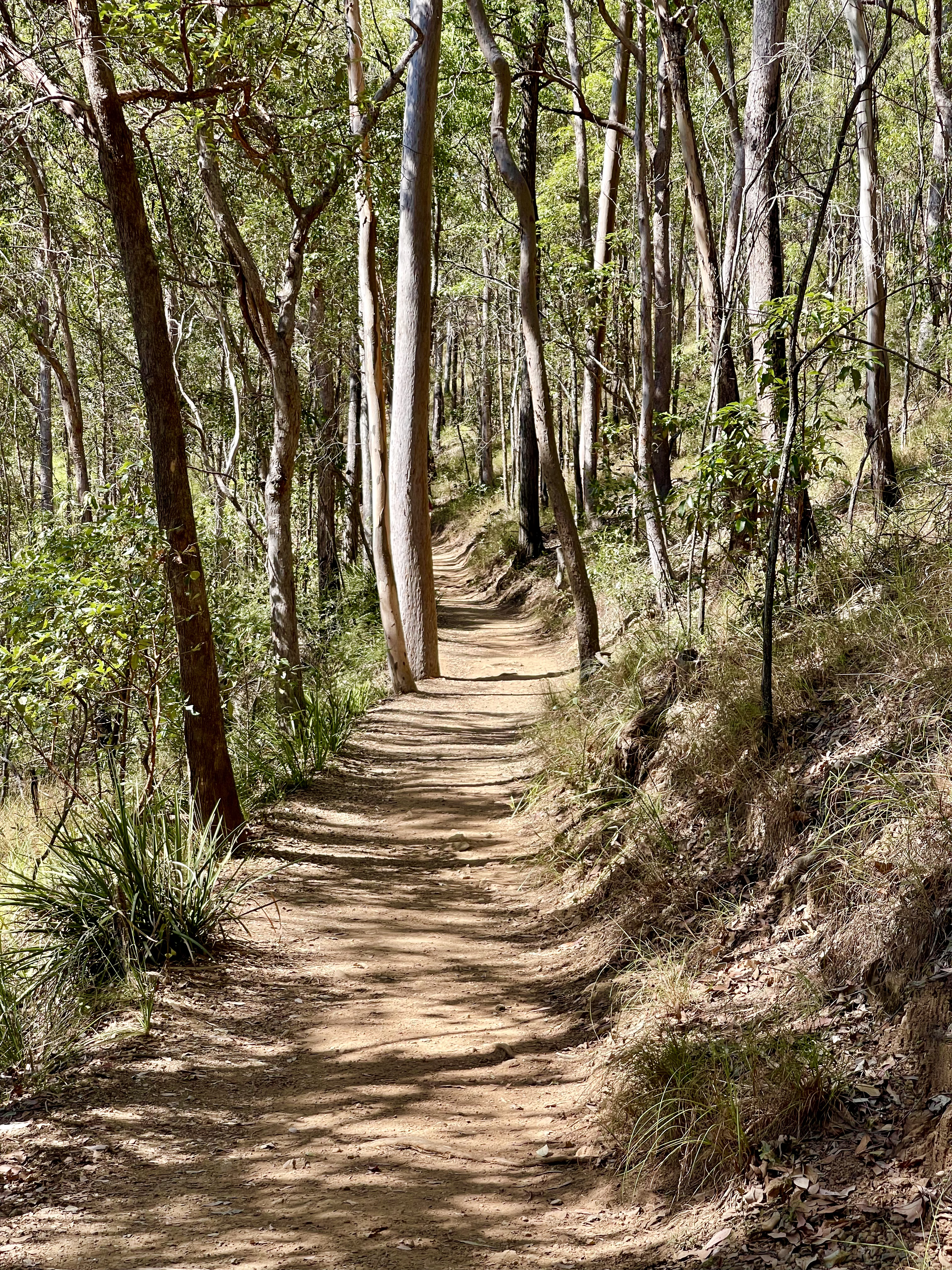
Honeyeater Track, 2021

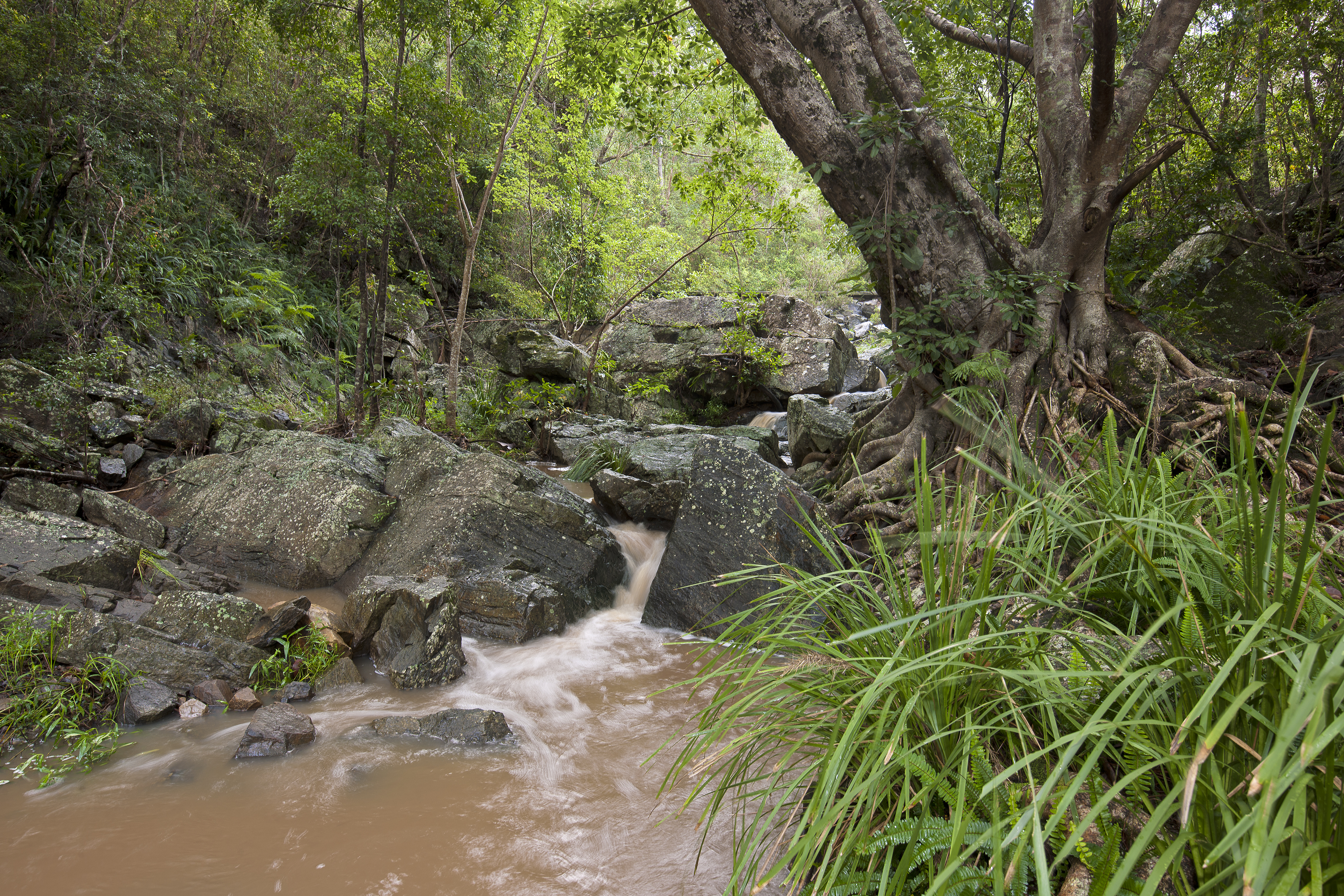
Mount Coot-tha Forest creek

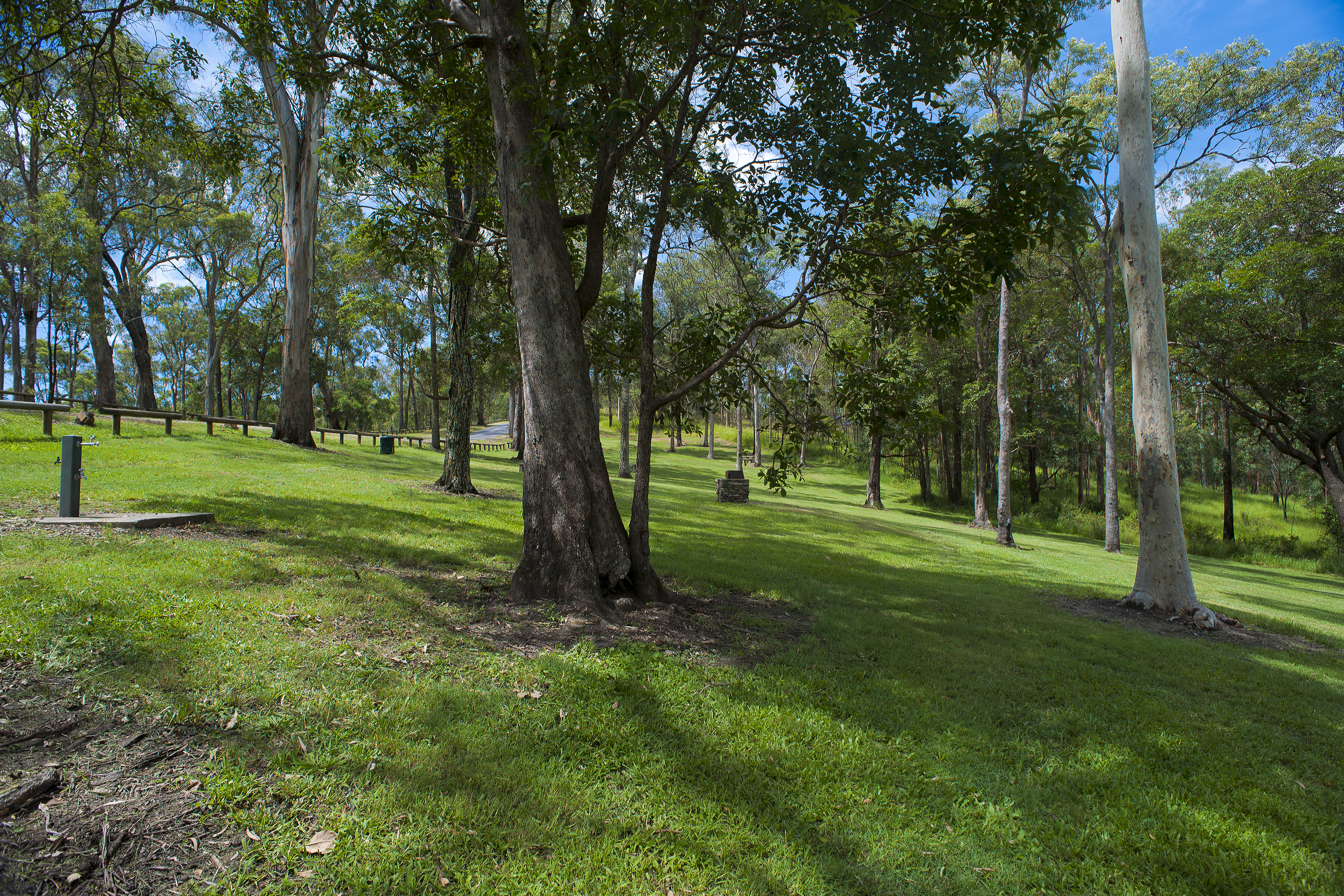
Rangeview Picnic area

Mount Coot-tha Forest is part of the Taylor Range which forms a backdrop of hills to the city of Brisbane, and is the best known vantage point from which to view Brisbane and surrounds, offering sweeping views of the city, Moreton Bay, Stradbroke Island and the southern ranges. Since the 1870s the area has been extensively utilised in a number of ways including as a timber reserve, a vantage point, a place of recreation, for gold mining, as a military site and for television broadcasting. It is now predominantly used as a recreation and picnicking area and is the broadcasting site for several television stations. It forms part of Brisbane Forest Park.

The Taylor Range was originally named Glenmorrison Range by the explorer John Oxley in 1823. In the earliest recorded visit to Mount Coot-tha by European explorers, including surveyor Allan Cunningham, on 6 July 1828, this range was referred to as Glenmoriston's Range and Sir Herbert Taylor's Range by the colonial botanist, Charles Fraser, and as Glenmorriston's Range by Captain Patrick Logan, Commandant of the penal settlement at Brisbane. Fraser's journal describes in detail the species of trees found there, and that the view from the south-east to north-west was extensive and very grand.

During the decades following the commencement of free settlement in Brisbane in 1842, Mount Coot-tha appears to have been highly valued as a vantage point for recreation and survey and as the source of fresh water streams. The area was originally known as One Tree Hill after all the vegetation on the knoll was cleared except for one large gum tree. When Reverend Bell made an application in 1865 to purchase land on One Tree Hill, it was refused with the Surveyor General noting it was required for trigonometrical purposes, and moreover was frequently used by the people of Brisbane for recreation on account of the extensive views and fresh air. Thus Mount Coot-tha's value as a vantage point and a place of recreation was recognised at an early stage in the city's development.

In 1860 Brisbane Forest Park was investigated for gold prospecting opportunities through the government funded Gold Exploration Expedition. The findings of the expedition was that, with one or two exceptions, there were no discoveries worthy of notice. Despite this, gold prospectors persisted and a number of small claims were established. It was 1894 before the first claim was recorded in Mount Coot-tha Forest and seemed to have been a tentative affair, not proceeding beyond the initial explorations. In 1933 it was cleaned out and retested. The remains of these attempts are still evident on the eastern bank of Ithaca Creek. Gold prospecting continued intermittently in Mount Coot-tha Forest until the early 1950s but no significant finds were recorded. Some remnants of these activities remain with a number of shafts, open cuts and a trolley line dating from the early 1950s.

The Taylor Range provided a source of good timber and One Tree Hill was first proclaimed a reserve for railway purposes on 21 February 1873 in order that the source of timber could be secured for development of the railway from Ipswich to Brisbane. In 1880 the timber reserve was cancelled and the area was re-designated as a Reserve for a Public Park under the Crown Lands Alienation Act 1861. One Tree Hill, including 1,500 acres (610 ha) of surrounding bush land, extending from Toowong Cemetery to Gap Creek, was placed in the care of a body of trustees and declared a reserve for public recreation. The site was renamed Mount Coot-tha in 1883 with the name being thought to derive from the aboriginal word for native honey, ku-ta.

The Trust oversaw numerous works projects in the Reserve including fencing, road construction and clearing vegetation. In 1884 the Trust recorded the attendance of some 9000 visitors to the area between April and December demonstrating its popularity with the public. Mount Coot-tha Forest became even more accessible to the public with the granting of the Saturday half-holiday in Queensland, as part of the Factories and Shops Act 1900. The half-holiday was the beginning of the weekend as an institution, and together with public holidays, the popularity of recreation areas and activities increased.

The traditional route up Mount Coot-tha, and now one of the main access roads, is Sir Samuel Griffith Drive. Originally people walked up Mount Coot-tha and from this a track developed. By the 1870s some adventurous people were driving up with horses and carriages. When the area became a public park in 1880, the track was improved to become a steep and windy road that traversed Mount Coot-tha in a circular route, a popular route for walkers, buggies and the occasional motorist. This track formed the basis of Sir Samuel Griffith Drive, named after one of the more eminent trustees, Sir Samuel Griffith, twice Premier of Queensland, from 1883 to 1888 and then again from 1890 to 1893. By the 1920s it was a favoured scenic circuit regularly utilised by motoring day-trippers and for car rallies and in the early 1930s was dedicated as a public road.

Looking at the view has been the most popular and continuing form of recreation on Mount Coot-tha and in 1886, to accommodate people's needs, a shelter shed and water tank were erected on the area of the present Mt Coot-tha Lookout. In 1901 a pedestal and directional dial, identifying elements of the panorama, were installed. For many years this small feature was a landmark for visitors to the lookout and was a precursor to the directional plate located on the modern lookout platform. A small timber kitchen was later built in 1912. A larger kiosk was constructed c.1918 and formed the basis of the present kiosk. In 1928 the kiosk was enlarged and a two-storey timber extension for living quarters was added. The early shelter shed and small kitchen were demolished. During World War II the lookout was converted to military use. In 1949 and 1950 further work and extensions were carried out including a circular drive, new entrance, raised viewing platform, lounge and lavatories, extensions to the living quarters and construction of a timber tankstand.

Prior to the First World War, two dams were built on the gully formed by East Ithaca Creek, in the area now known as J.C. Slaughter Falls. It is unclear when and by whom the dams were constructed although records show them being in place by 1913. The dams were appreciated as a scenic picnic spot and by bird-watchers, wildlife enthusiasts and amateur artists. The destruction of the lower dam by flood in 1916 did not detract from the appeal of the setting and it "remained a spectacular ruin" below the new dam, erected in 1921. By the mid-1950s the area had fallen into disrepair and the surviving dam was demolished in the late 1960s or early 1970s. In 1974, following extensive improvements along East Ithaca Creek gully, J.C. Slaughter Falls Park, named in honour of the Town Clerk and City Administrator from 1940 to 1967, was opened. In the West Ithaca Creek area a similar development was completed in the late 1970s and was named after the local pioneering landowner Captain Henry George Simpson.

In 1919, following some years of financial difficulties, the Trust was disbanded and the Reserve was transferred to the Toowong Town Council. In 1925, the Queensland Parliament passed the City of Brisbane Act 1924 to set up a single local government in Brisbane. This led to control of Mount Coot-tha passing to the newly formed Brisbane City Council. The first elected mayor was Sir William Jolly and part of his election promise was the extension and improvement of the park system, including the securing of vantage points like Mount Coot-tha. Therefore, under the Jolly administration, the area of the Reserve expanded dramatically, acquiring more than 1,000 acres (400 ha). On his retirement Jolly stated that he felt that securing Mount Coot-tha Reserve was one of his administration's most important achievements.

During the Second World War, the Mount Coot-tha Forest was turned over for military use and served as a mine storage and assembly depot. They redirected water from several of the creeks in the area to provide water for the military. Personnel from the 55th US Naval Construction Battalion and the RAAF Magnetic and Acoustic Mines Section were based at the depot, with the major camp area lying on the eastern point of the Forest near the present Hoop Pine picnic area. In 1944 the facility was dismantled and moved to Darwin although work was carried out on the building and mine depots until 1945. Rehabilitation of the area commenced in late 1946. A number of features installed by the military such as some concrete slabs, concrete channeling, footbridges and terracing still remain. The concrete slabs have been incorporated into the picnic areas as the floors of picnic shelters and as the floor of the open air chapel at J.C. Slaughter Falls.

The 1950s saw the introduction of television to Australia and by 1959 Channel Nine and Channel Seven both commenced broadcasting in Brisbane resulting in Brisbane City Council giving permission for the construction of transmission towers on Mount Coot-tha. Eventually two more towers were constructed for Channel Ten and the Australian Broadcasting Corporation (ABC). The three towers for the commercial television stations, Channel Seven, Channel Nine and Channel Ten, are located on private freehold land along with their respective studio facilities. The fourth tower, used by the ABC, is on land owned by the Brisbane City Council. The towers are highly visible from many parts of Brisbane, even at night as they are mounted with blinking warning lights for aviation purposes. The towers are not included in the entry in the Heritage Register.

Apart from its many different land uses by the people of Queensland, Mount Coot-tha Forest provides an area of natural habitat for plants and animals. Its topography provides a variety of habitats for vegetation and for many species of fauna, including three rare species of owl - Powerful owl (Ninox strenua), Masked owl (Tyto novaehollandiae) and Sooty owl (Tyto tenebricosa).

Mount Coot-tha Forest has an extensive and diverse history of uses and associations since the late 1800s to the present including as a timber reserve, a vantage point, a place of recreation, for gold mining, as a military site and for television broadcasting. Its predominant use now is as a recreation and picnicking area and it is the broadcasting site for several television stations.

== Description ==
Mount Coot-tha Forest is one of Brisbane's largest natural areas, with over 1,500 hectares (3,700 acres) of open eucalypt forest just 15 minutes drive from the CBD. Flanking the south-western suburbs of Brisbane lies the Taylor Range, the southern end of which ends abruptly at Mount Coot-tha. It is located approximately 5 kilometres (3.1 mi) west of Brisbane CBD and abuts the suburbs of Enoggera, The Gap, Ashgrove, Bardon, Rainworth, Toowong, Taringa, Chapel Hill, Kenmore Hills and Brookfield. It is primarily accessed by Simpsons Road, Mount Coot-tha Road, Sir Samuel Griffith Drive, Dillon Road, Gap Creek Road and Gold Creek Road.

The vegetation of Mount Coot-tha is mainly associated with dry eucalypt forest including the species, Spotted gum (Corymbia varigata), Grey gum (Eucalyptus propinqua), Forest red gum (Eucalyptus tereticornis) and Narrow-leafed ironbark (Eucalyptus crebra). Various species of acacias, including Brisbane Golden Wattle (Acacia fimbriata) and Broadleaf Wattle (Acacia implexa) are predominant in the understorey shrubs along with grass trees Xanthorrhoea species. Native grasses, primarily kangaroo grass (Themeda triandra) and Blady grass (Imperata cylindrica) make up the minimal ground cover.

Sir Samuel Griffith Drive is a two lane circuit of the outer edge of Mount Coot-tha. It has an undulating circuit through open forest and offers shifting views of the city. It is a renowned tourist drive, providing access to many picnic areas and vantage points in Mount Coot-tha Forest.

Gold mining related remnants include a wooden trolley line, well, wooden shaft structure, battery site, concrete plinth, iron cover, dam, sump and ore dump.

Second World War remnants include concrete slabs and a number of creek crossings, concrete drains and footbridges at the J.C. Slaughter Falls and Hoop Pine Picnic Grounds. There is also a "Detonator Locker", cut into a hillside and partially covered with earth, beside one of the walking tracks in J.C. Slaughter Falls Park. It is formed by curved corrugated iron, rolled to an elliptical profile. The manufacturer's stamp "Manufactured by the American Rolling Mill Co. Middleton Ohio" is still clearly visible. The back wall of the shelter is formed by tray-profile sheet metal. A steel frame surrounds the opening. There is a section of steel frame inside the shelter, which appears to have been built to reinforce the structure.

The ABC broadcast tower and associated structures (located on Lease A on SP122735) are not included in the entry in the Heritage Register.

== Heritage listing ==
Mount Coot-tha Forest was listed on the Queensland Heritage Register on 4 September 2007 having satisfied the following criteria.

The place is important in demonstrating the evolution or pattern of Queensland's history.

Mount Coot-tha Forest is an early example of the importance that the Queensland public placed upon recreational, scenic and environmental values. It has been used as a vantage point since the first recorded European ascent of Mount Coot-tha in 1828. Since then, the growing popularity of visiting the summit has reflected the emergence of leisure and recreation time for the general populace, and the advent and popularity of the motor car. The area has been continually used and enjoyed by the public since the early development of Brisbane. It is also important for demonstrating a range of different land uses such as a reference point for surveying, timber reserve, gold mining and military activities that are representative of Queensland history while retaining its original values.

The place demonstrates rare, uncommon or endangered aspects of Queensland's cultural heritage.

The remnants of gold mining in Mount Coot-tha Forest represents a now uncommon aspect of Queensland's history. While gold prospecting was once a common way of life in Queensland, the proximity of gold prospecting activity so close to Brisbane is uncommon. These remnants are the only physical evidence left of the attempts to establish a fledgling gold industry at Mount Coot-tha.

The place has potential to yield information that will contribute to an understanding of Queensland's history.

The remnants of gold mining activity have the potential to yield information about the nature and scope of the activities that took place in Mount Coot-tha Forest which will contribute to an understanding of how the area was used over time.

The place is important because of its aesthetic significance.

Mount Coot-tha Forest is important because of its aesthetic significance as a prominent scenic and landmark element in the cityscape and affords spectacular views in all directions, as well as views to the mountain, particularly from the city.

The place has a strong or special association with a particular community or cultural group for social, cultural or spiritual reasons.

The recreational, scenic and environmental attributes of Mount Coot-tha Forest have been valued by the people of Brisbane since the early days of European settlement in Brisbane. The use of the area for leisure activities was strengthened with the legislation of the Saturday half day holiday in 1900 which heralded the beginning of the traditional weekend. The picnic areas and walking tracks are evidence of the continuity of recreational activities in Mount Coot-tha Forest since the late 1800s to the present and the area is popular with different recreational groups including scouts, bushwalkers, runners and mountain bike riders.

The place has a special association with the life or work of a particular person, group or organisation of importance in Queensland's history.

Mount Coot-tha Forest has strong association with former Queensland Premiers Sir Samuel Griffith, who was a trustee, and Sir William Jolly who, through his administration in the mid 1920s, was instrumental in maintaining and expanding Mount Coot-tha Forest and played an important role in ensuring the area was preserved for the enjoyment of the Queensland public into the future.
