= J C Slaughter Falls =

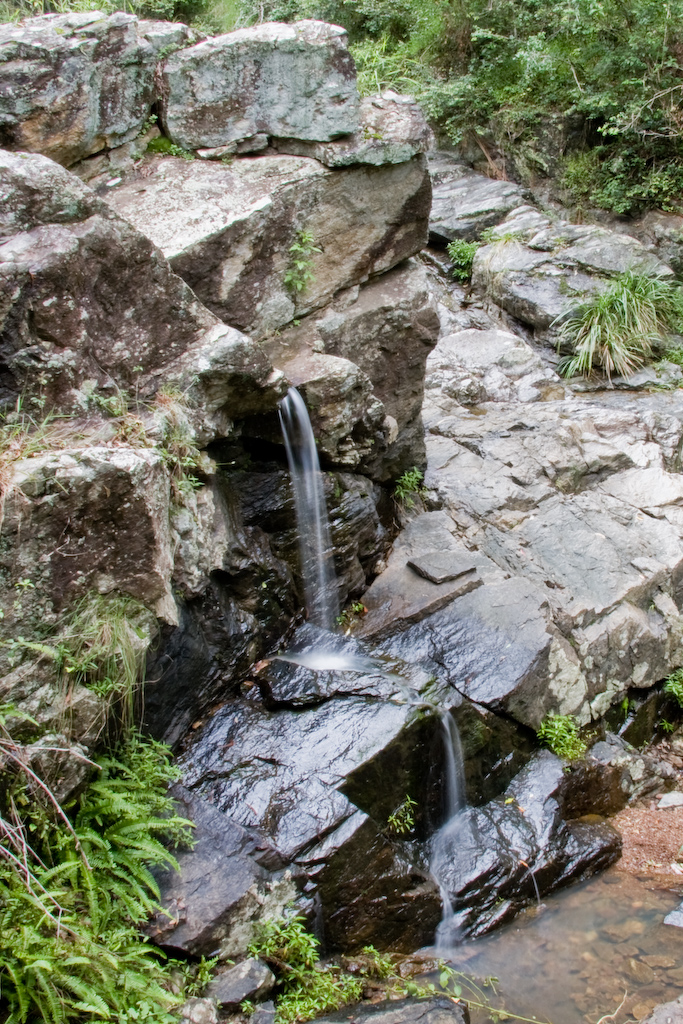
- J C Slaughter Falls

- Location within Queensland
- Location: Brisbane, Queensland
- Coordinates: 27.4758°S 152.9617°E
- Type: Cascade
- Watercourse: Ithaca Creek

The J C Slaughter Falls is a cascade waterfall on the Ithaca Creek lin the suburb of Mount Coot-tha, approximately 10 kilometres (6.2 mi) west of the Brisbane central business district in Queensland, Australia.

== History ==
During World War II, large parts of Mount Coot-tha Forest were used as a munitions store for the United States Navy. Some of the local creeks were redirected to provide water for the military's use, in addition to the two dams that previously existed on Mount Coot-tha. The dams altered the natural supply of water to Slaughter Falls. Subsequent landscaping to establish the JC Slaughter Falls Picnic area occurred during the 1960s.

== Location and features ==
The falls are situated within Mount Coot-tha Forest park, where there is a picnic area and parking area.

The Mount Coot-tha summit track travels from the J C Slaughter Falls Picnic Area through open eucalyptus forest. The grade is steep over short sections. Mount Coot-tha Lookout offers sweeping views of the city, Moreton Bay, Stradbroke Island and the southern ranges. The track is classified as an easy walk and takes about one hour and is 3.8 kilometres (2.4 mi) return in distance. Mount Coot-tha Forest is 5 kilometres (3 mi) west of Brisbane Central Business District. Access is via Sir Samuel Griffith Drive or Gap Creek Road, Mount Coot-tha.

== See also ==
- List of waterfalls
- List of waterfalls in Australia
