= Green Hill Reservoir =

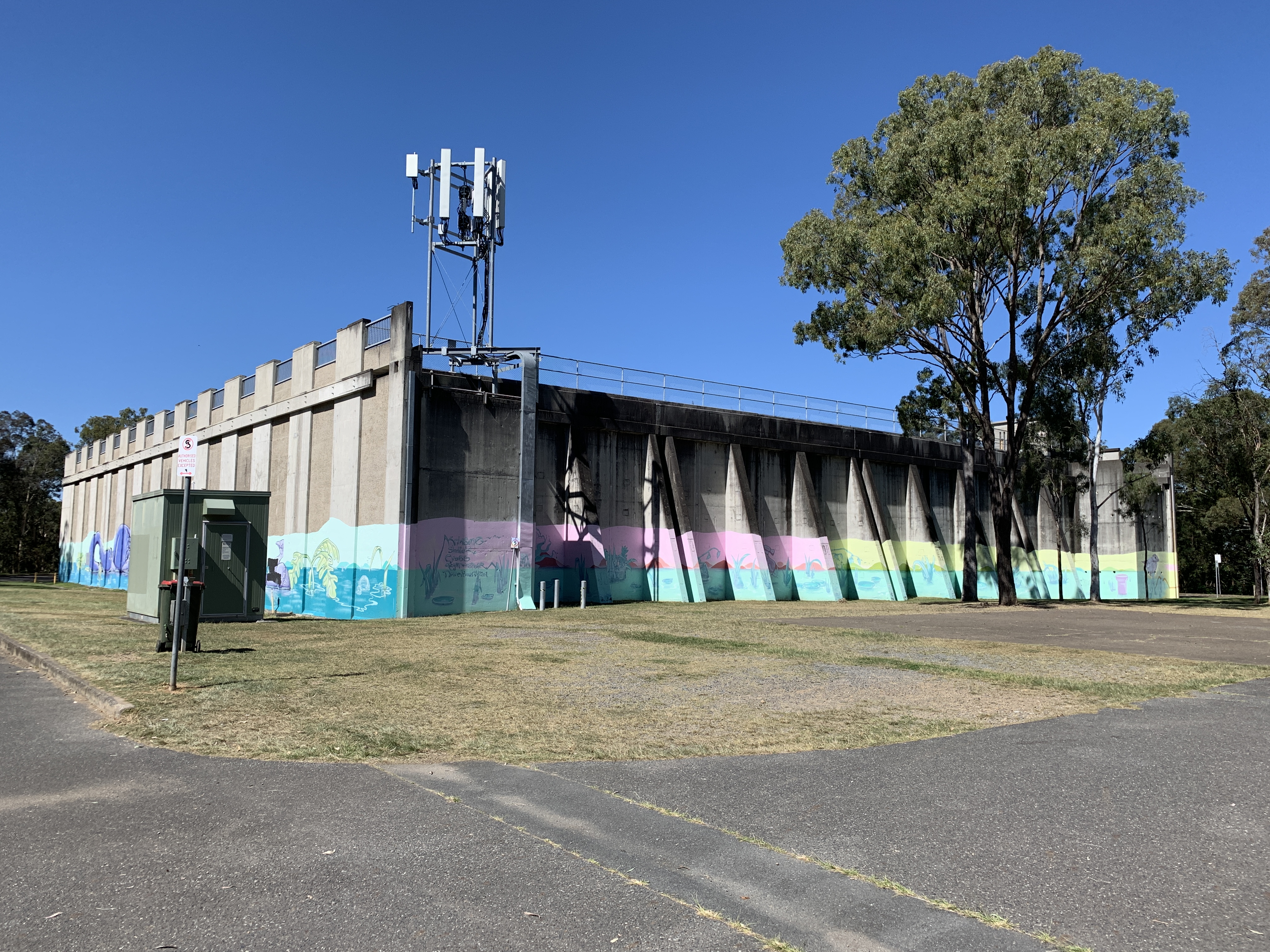
- Green Hill Reservoir, 2022

- Location within Queensland
- Location: Chapel Hill, Brisbane, Queensland, Australia
- Coordinates: 27°29′41″S 152°57′27″E
- Type: reservoir
- Basin countries: Australia
- Water volume: 155 ML (5.5×10^{6} cu ft)

Green Hill Reservoir is a pair of reservoirs in Chapel Hill, Brisbane, Queensland, Australia. Two underground concrete reservoirs, 77 ML (2.7×10^{6} cu ft) each, were built in 1968. They are one of the largest potable water reservoirs in Brisbane.

== Amenities ==
The surrounding parkland is an off-leash dog park, but, unusually for Brisbane, it is unfenced.

Being located on a local high point, there are views to the Brisbane CBD and across the western suburbs of Brisbane. It is known as Tom Gaffney Lookout.

== See also ==
- List of dams and reservoirs in Australia
