= Chapel Hill, Queensland =

Chapel Hill
- Suburb
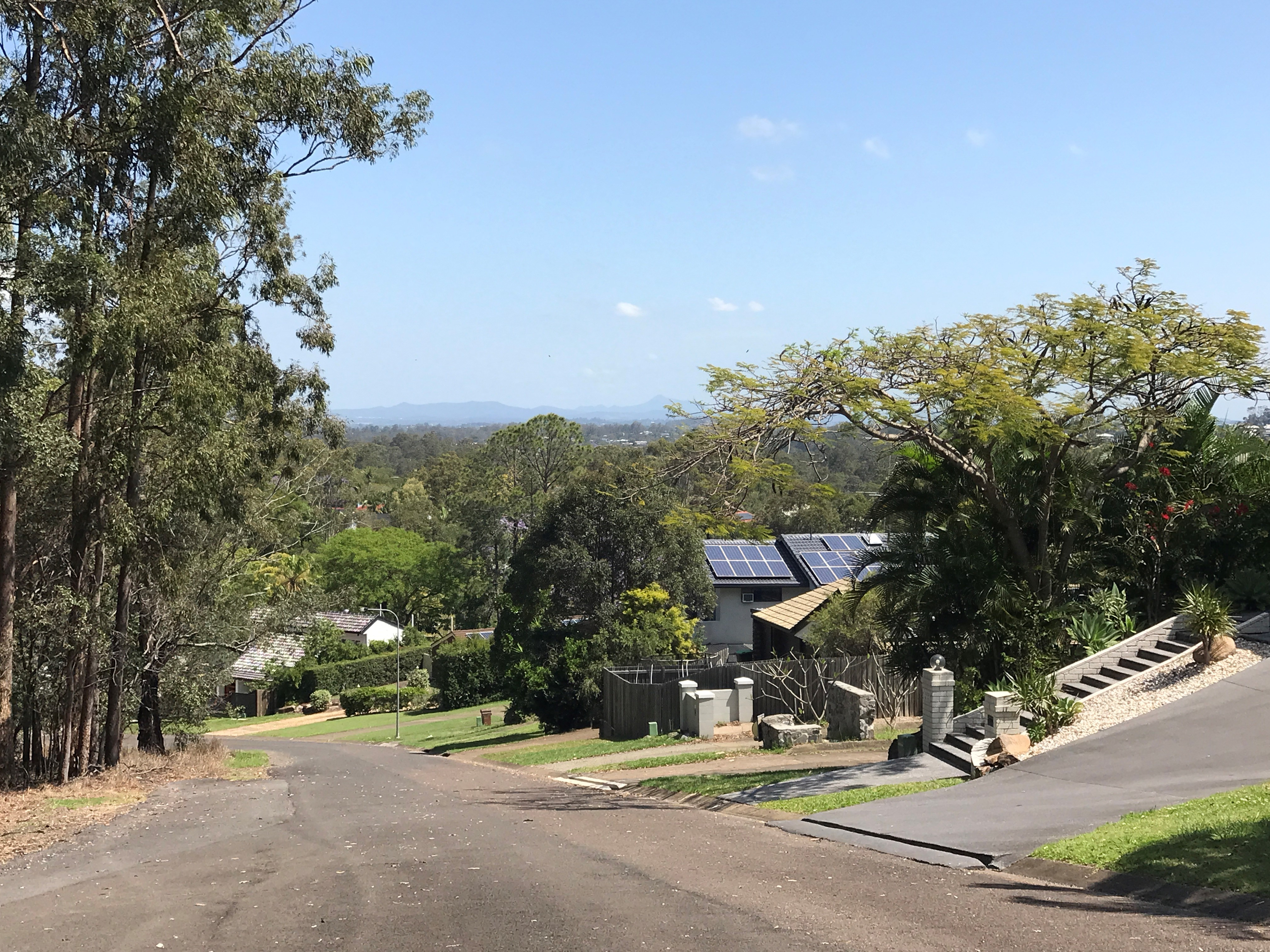
- View across Chapel Hill from the top of Chapel Hill Road, 2021

- Interactive map of Chapel Hill
- Coordinates: 27.4997°S 152.9491°E
- Country: Australia
- State: Queensland
- City: Brisbane
- LGA: City of Brisbane (Pullenvale Ward, Walter Taylor Ward)
- Location: 11.5 km (7.1 mi) SW of Brisbane CBD

Government
  - State electorate: Moggill
  - Federal division: Ryan

Area
  - Total: 5.0 km^{2} (1.9 sq mi)

Population
  - Total: 10,511 (2021 census)
  - Density: 2,102/km^{2} (5,440/sq mi)
- Time zone: UTC+10:00 (AEST)
- Postcode: 4069
Suburbs around Chapel Hill
Mount Coot-tha	Mount Coot-tha	Mount Coot-tha
Kenmore Hills	Chapel Hill	Indooroopilly
Kenmore	Fig Tree Pocket	Indooroopilly

Chapel Hill is a western suburb in the City of Brisbane, Queensland, Australia. In the 2021 census, Chapel Hill had a population of 10,511 people.

== Geography ==
Chapel Hill is primarily a residential suburb, consisting of mostly detached housing and backs on to the Mt Coot-tha reserve and walking tracks.

== History ==
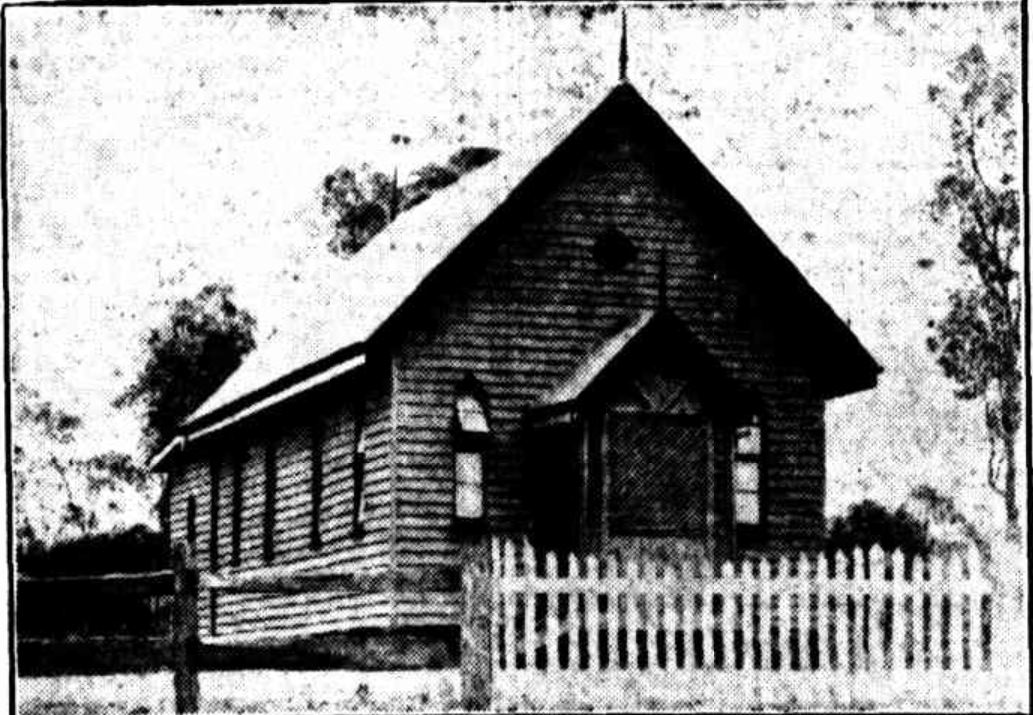
Methodist Church, celebrating its diamond jubilee, 1932

The suburb takes its name from the Primitive Methodist chapel built on the top of the hill in 1874.

The ground for the Primitive Methodist Church in Indooroopilly (as Chapel Hill was then known) was officially broken in a ceremony on Monday 10 November 1873. The church opened on Sunday 28 March 1875. The current church was built in 1955, with the historic church retained as a community facility. As the church is located on a highpoint within the area, the suburb takes its name from this church on the hill.

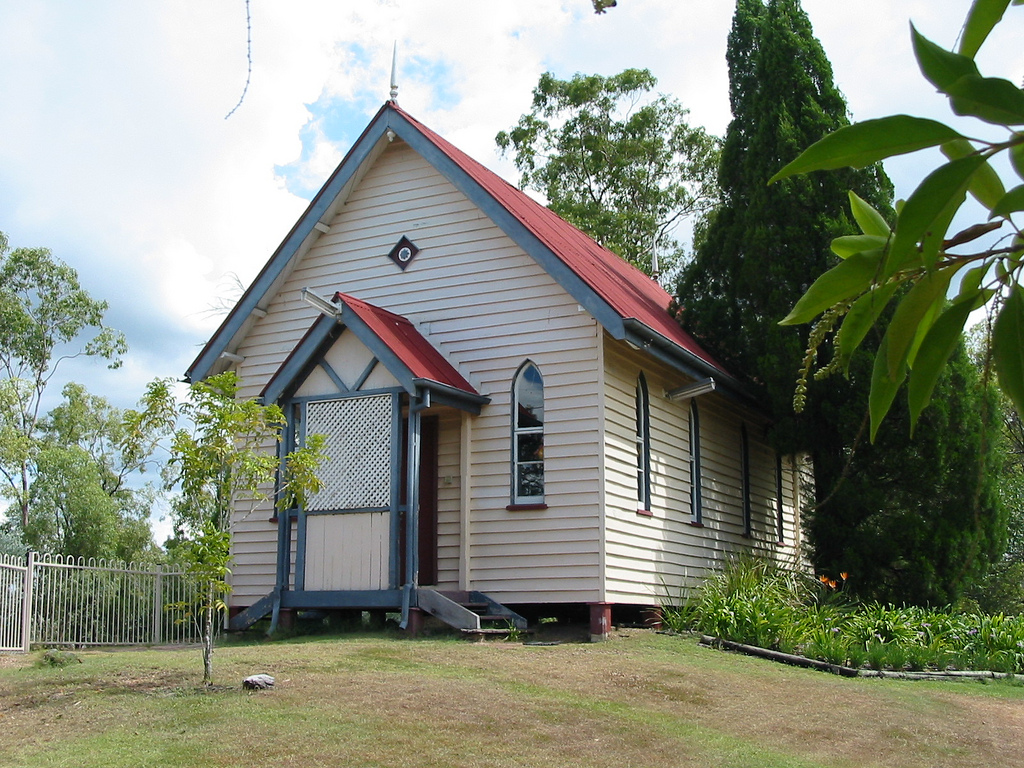
Methodist Chapel, 2011

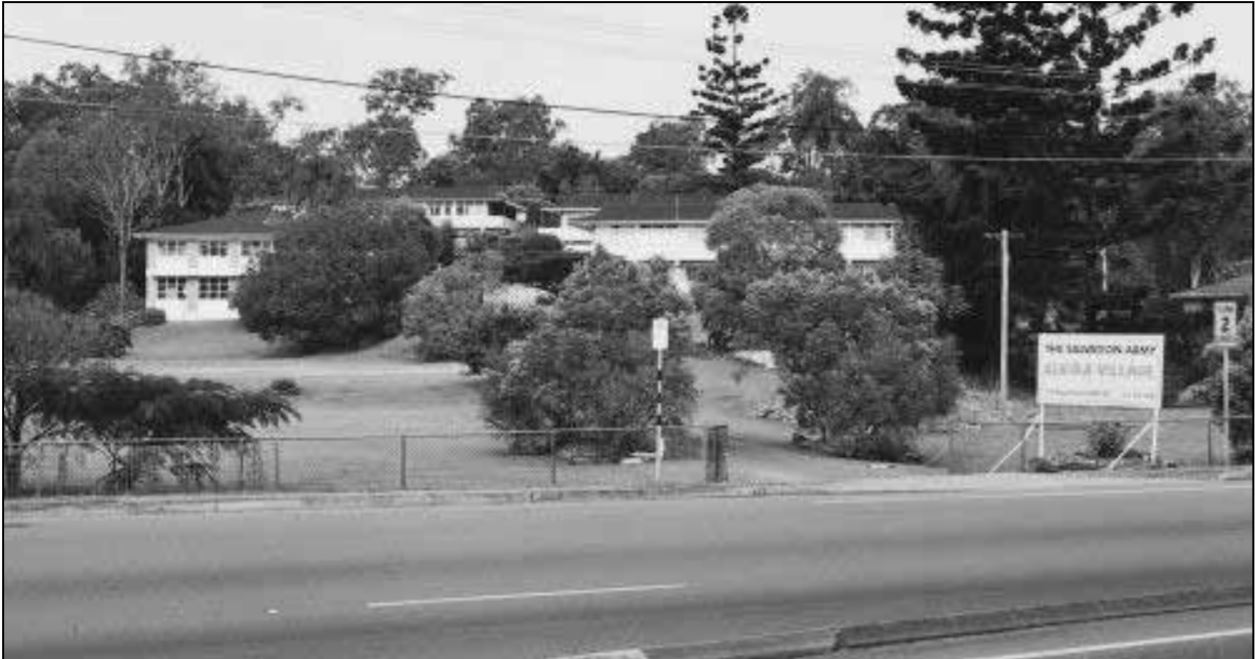
Alkira Boys' Home, operated by the Salvation Army

On 20 November 1922, the Queensland Governor Matthew Nathan officially opened the Industrial School for Boys on a site between Moggill Road and Jerrang Road (now 724 Moggill Road, 27.5093°S 152.9564°E). It was operated by the Salvation Army for orphaned, abandoned and neglected boys. The 22-acre (8.9 ha) site had been purchased for £2300 and donated by philanthropist William Robert Black, who also paid £2700 to extend and renovate the buildings on site and for new furnishings. Black also provided for £100 per annum for maintenance. When it opened, there were 35 boys under the supervision of the first superintendent, Ensign Rogan. The school could provide accommodation for 50 boys supervised by nine staff. In 1942, due to fears of a Japanese invasion during World War II, the school evacuated to Washpool. In 1945 the school returned to the Indooroopilly site where it operated as a boys' home rather than as an industrial school. In 1968 was renamed Cooinda Salvation Army Home for Boys, but was renamed again in 1969 to be Alkira, Salvation Army Home for Boys. It closed in 1983 due to a loss of funding. As at 2021, the site is still owned by the Salvation Army, but has been reduced to 53,320 square metres (13.18 acres) and is used to operate The Cairns Aged Care Centre. The buildings of the former boys' home are no longer extant.

Chapel Hill State School opened on 23 January 1978. with an enrolment of 152 pupils after the Queensland Government acquired 6.8 hectares (17 acres) of land in 1976. In 1979 the first teaching block and covered area were built, and by 1982 there were 324 pupils justifying building a separate library, so it could move out of the Administration block. A number of demountable buildings were acquired as the population increased, and in 1997 a new hall was rented. In June 2012 the Ross Perry Resource Centre was opened; named after retiring principal Ross Perry. The school uniform was designed in 1977 and was changed slightly in 1994. It was also changed in 2013.

== Demographics ==
In the 2011 census, Chapel Hill had a population of 10,168 people.

In the 2016 census, Chapel Hill had a population of 10,113 people, 50.7% female and 49.3% male. The median age of the Chapel Hill population was 41 years of age, 3 years above the Australian median. 64.1% of people living in Chapel Hill were born in Australia, compared to the national average of 71.1%; the next most common countries of birth were England 5.8%, South Africa 3.1%, New Zealand 2.9%, China 2.2%, India 1.4%. 78.5% of people spoke only English at home; the next most popular languages were 3.8% Mandarin, 1.3% Cantonese, 0.9% Spanish, 0.9% German, 0.8% Korean. Chapel Hill has a highly educated population with over 49% of residents holding a bachelor's degree or above, compared to the Australian average of 22.0%.

In the 2021 census, Chapel Hill had a population of 10,511 people.

== Education ==
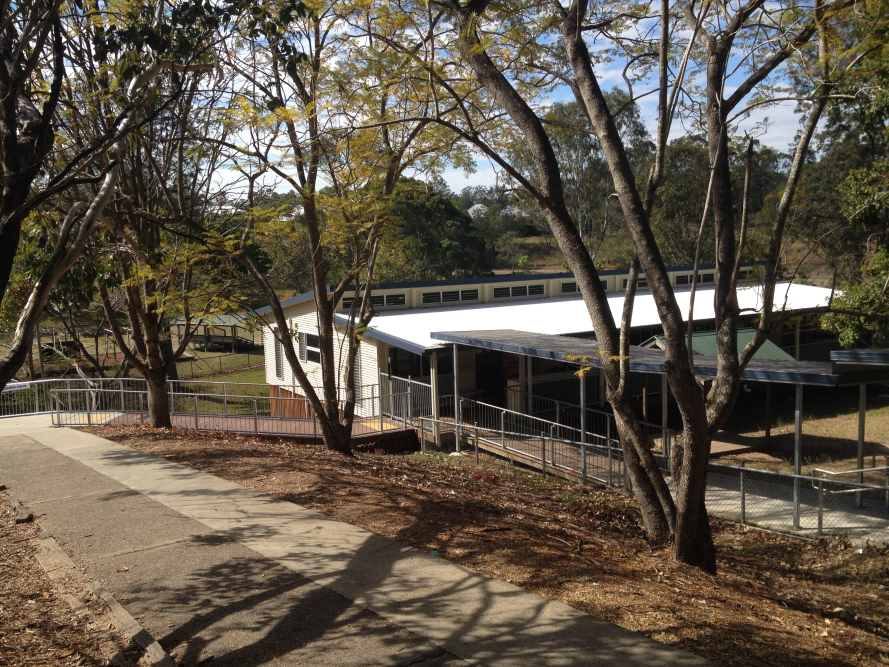
Chapel Hill State School, 2014

The suburb of Chapel Hill falls into the catchment of Chapel Hill State School, Indooroopilly State School, and Kenmore State School.

Chapel Hill State School is a government primary (Prep–6) school for boys and girls at 20 Ironbark Road (27.4993°S 152.9449°E). In 2018, the school had an enrolment of 744 students with 52 teachers (43 full-time equivalent) and 27 non-teaching staff (17 full-time equivalent). It includes a special education program.

The nearest government secondary schools are Indooroopilly State High School in neighbouring Indooroopilly to the east and Kenmore State High School in neighbouring Kenmore to the west.

There are no private schools in Chapel Hill.

== Transport ==
Moggill Road is the major road through Chapel Hill connecting it to the suburbs of Indooroopilly to the east, and Kenmore to the west. The Western Freeway allows quick access to the suburb from around Brisbane and with the opening of the Legacy Way tunnel, the traffic flow is significantly better at peak times and the commute to the airport takes approx 25 mins, when travelling via both Legacy Way and Airport Link tunnels. There are also the four bus routes, the 425, the 426, the 427 and the 428 that service a large portion of Chapel Hill. The 425 travels to Indooroopilly shopping centre and Toowong Village, continuing into the Brisbane CBD. The 426 is an express bus that services only Chapel Hill, and then travels direct to the CBD via the Western Freeway (M5), Legacy Way Tunnel, and onto the Inner Northern Busway. The morning P426 commute is less than 25 minutes from Chapel Hill to the Brisbane CBD, even in peak hour, due to this routing.

For cyclists, Chapel Hill is extremely well serviced with dedicated bikeway access to the CBD via the Centenary Bikeway, Sylvan Road bike path, and Coronation Drive Bikeway.

The morning P426 bus includes direct stops at Brisbane Grammar School, Brisbane Girls Grammar School, St Joseph's College, Gregory Terrace, and other inner city Private Schools. The 425 bus has direct access to Brisbane Boys' College. The 427 bus route provides direct access to Indooroopilly State High School and St Peters Lutheran College.

Chapel Hill is close to the University of Queensland, with direct bus routes to and from the university.

== Amenities ==
There are no major shopping centres in Chapel Hill, but there are two small shopping precincts, one centred on Moggill Road, Market Street and Moordale Streets (27.5057°S 152.9603°E) and another on Fleming Road (27.4943°S 152.9454°E). A major shopping centre, Indooroopilly Shopping Centre, is in neighbouring Indooroopilly and there are supermarkets in neighbouring Kenmore.

The only church in Chapel Hill is Chapel Hill Uniting Church located on the hill at 9 Chapel Hill Road (corner of Moggill Road, 27.5078°S 152.9532°E). The church hall was originally a Primitive Methodist chapel built in 1875, and the suburb takes its name from this chapel on the hill. There is a small closed cemetery beside the church (27.5076°S 152.9535°E). Although the cemetery is located on the same parcel of land as the church, it was established as a general cemetery and not associated with the church.

The Chapel Hill State School hall is sometimes used for numerous events such as local, state and federal elections and weekly church services.

Many locals take advantage of the hiking and walking trails in Mount Coot-tha Reserve which climb to the summit of Mount Coot-tha and overlooks Brisbane. Native fauna and flora are often seen on these paths. Some of these trails also attract mountain bikers on the weekends. A popular spot for locals is the Green Hill Reservoir off Chapel Hill Road which includes an off-leash area for dogs and of the city so it is usually crowded during events hosting fireworks, such as Brisbane Riverfire. Running and exercise groups often also use this area in the early hours. There are bike paths in the suburb which link up to roads and bikeways that ultimately stretch through the western suburbs to the Brisbane CBD.

The Cairns Aged Care Centre is at 724–730 Moggill Road (27.5086°S 152.9578°E). It is operated by the Salvation Army. It is named after named after two Salvation Army Commissioners, brothers William Cairns and Alistair Cairns.

=== Parks ===
There are a number of parks in the area:

- Alana Court Park (27.4981°S 152.9484°E)
- Ardes Street Park (27.4961°S 152.9478°E)
- Bielby Road Park (27.4896°S 152.9351°E)
- Boblynne Street Park (no.32) (27.5056°S 152.9487°E)
- Boblynne Street Park (no 64) (27.5041°S 152.9490°E)
- Cicada Park on Ironbark Road (27.4956°S 152.9417°E)
- Clarina Street Park (27.5012°S 152.9609°E)
- Cubberla Creek Reserve, also known as Akuna Oval, on Hepworth Street (27.5148°S 152.9524°E)
- Dillingen Street Park (27.4917°S 152.9404°E)
- Green Hill Reservoir Park, also known as Tom Gaffney Lookout, top of Russell Terrace (27.4956°S 152.9575°E)
- Hakea Crescent Park (27.5015°S 152.9437°E)
- Kennewell Park off Spring Street (27.5070°S 152.9597°E)
- Ludlow Street Park (27.5027°S 152.9527°E)
- Maculata Drive Park (27.5042°S 152.9425°E)
- Marminde Street Park (27.4931°S 152.9481°E)
- Merri Merri Park on Greenford Street (27.4841°S 152.9397°E)
- Moordale Street Park (27.5037°S 152.9577°E)
- Mount Coot-tha Reserve, top of Fleming Road (27.4816°S 152.9456°E)
- Nankoor Street Park (no.9) (27.4926°S 152.9501°E)
- Rebecca Street Park (27.5011°S 152.9479°E)
- Robin Powell Park, formerly Goolman Street Park (27.4995°S 152.9399°E)
- Sands Place Park (27.4948°S 152.9463°E)
- Sleaford Street Park (27.4880°S 152.9420°E)
- Sutling Street Park (27.5101°S 152.9513°E)
