= Ithaca Creek =

Ithaca
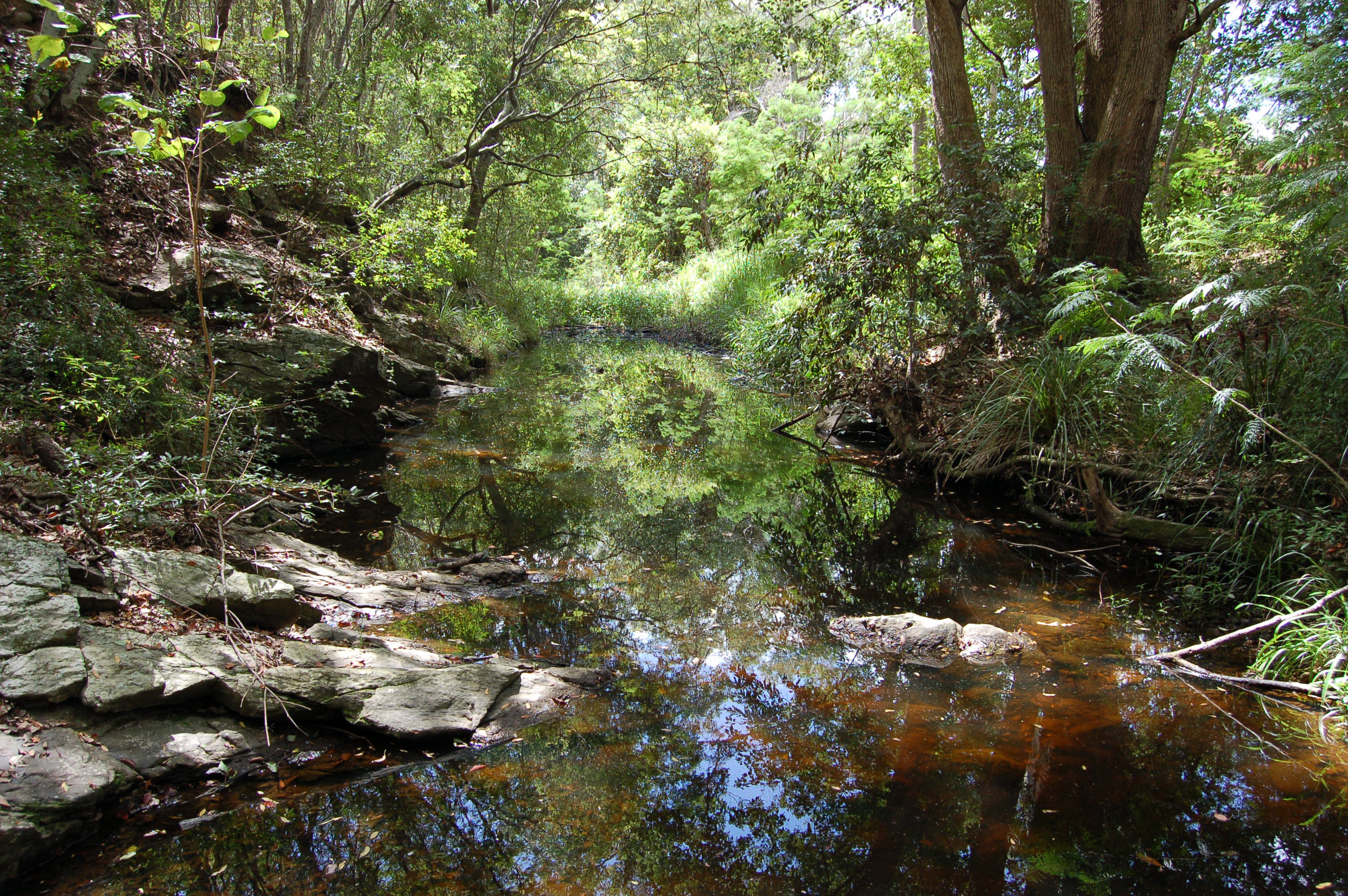
- Ithaca Creek at Bardon, 2007

Location
- Country: Australia
- State: Queensland
- Region: South East Queensland
- City: Brisbane

Physical characteristics
- Source: Mount Coot-tha
  - location: Taylor Range
- Mouth: Red Hill
  - location: Brisbane

Basin features
- River system: Enoggera Creek

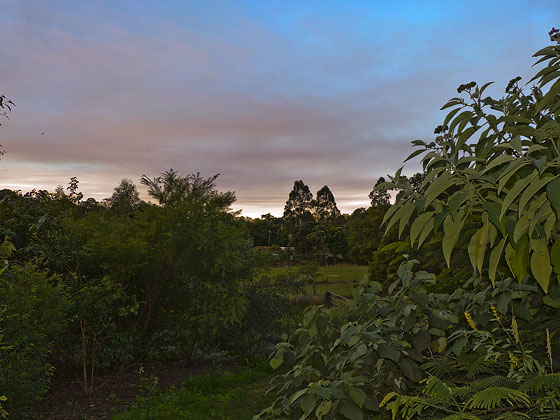
Ithaca Creek at Bardon, 2011.

Ithaca Creek is a waterway in the Enoggera Creek catchment, in the western suburbs of Brisbane, Queensland, Australia. It arises in the Taylor Range at the Mount Coot-tha forest with two streams, one arising at J C Slaughter Falls, the other and stronger source being Simpson Falls, the western branch.

Ithaca Creek runs through the suburbs of Bardon, Ashgrove and Red Hill, where it joins Enoggera Creek. Ithaca Intact, a creek restoration project by Save Our Waterways Now was backed by Queensland parliamentarians Kate Jones, Member for Ashgrove and then Minister for the Environment, Andrew Fraser, Member for Mount Coot-tha and Queensland Treasurer, as well as local government councillors Geraldine Knapp and David Hinchliffe.

On 9 August 2020, it was discovered that Google Maps had changed the name of the Brisbane River to Ithaca Creek after a complaint that Ithaca Creek was labelled as the Brisbane River.

== History ==
According to Queensland State Library, Ithaca Creek was named after the birthplace of Lady Diamantina Roma Bowen, wife of Sir George Ferguson Bowen, British colonial administrator, the 1st Governor of Queensland (in office 1859–1868). This appears to be in error as, according to the Australian Dictionary of Biography Diamantina was borne on Zante, another of the Ionian Islands. The Ionian Islands, now part of Greece, was a British protectorate at the time and likely referred to collectively rather than individually. Ithaca in Greece has one of the world's largest natural harbours and is famous in legend as Homer's Ithaca, the home of Ulysses, whose delayed return to the island is one of the plot elements of the Odyssey. James Joyce's novel Ulysses sets the story of the wandering Ulysses on one day in Dublin in the early 20th century.

Ithaca Creek was briefly considered as a potential main water supply for Brisbane but overlooked in favour of Enoggera Creek, upon which Enoggera Dam was constructed.

=== Nathan Avenue ===
Land on Ithaca Creek at present day Nathan Avenue, named after Queensland Governor Sir Matthew Nathan, was owned at one time by Charles James Graham (Under Secretary for Public Instruction until 1878). The land was subdivided in the late 1920s. It once joined Bruce Esplanade, named after Australia’s Prime Minister Stanley Bruce. During the Great Depression in the 1930s and World War 2 from 1939 to 1945, the land was owned by the Gramenz family. After 1947 it became part of a technical college known as the Ithaca campus of TAFE. In 2016 the 8000sqm creekside property was sold to TriCare Limited for $5.4 million for redevelopment as an aged-care facility.

== Ithaca Intact ==
Ithaca Intact was a project by Save Our Waterways Now which operated from 2007-2014. Its vision was to restore the whole creek from Mount Coot-tha to Red Hill by building partnerships with business and government, inform and involve the community, reduce key weed species on private and public land, improve water quality, increase flora and fauna and provide a peaceful and safe environment for enjoyment and relaxation. With support from Save Our Waterways Now, several local bushcare groups are continuing to support the vision of restoring the whole of Ithaca Creek.

In 2008, Ithaca Intact and the Ithaca Creek State School in Lugg Street Bardon developed an education unit based on sustainability and natural and built environments, using Ithaca Creek as the local learning context. The topics which were discussed included water quality, biodiversity, sustainability, fauna movement corridors, invasive species and the role of native species within Enoggera Catchment. Activities included habitat sampling and macro-invertebrate sampling highlighted through Channel 7’s The Great South East. Class 4/3 D ran activities throughout Science Week for the entire school. The students and teachers from Ithaca Creek State School formally adopted Ithaca Creek, taking responsibility for on-going care of the creek including monitoring litter, water quality and engaging with the local bushcare group regarding working bees and tree plantings.

== See also ==
- List of rivers of Australia § Queensland
