= Simpson Falls =

Waterfall in Brisbane, Australia

JC Slaughter Falls
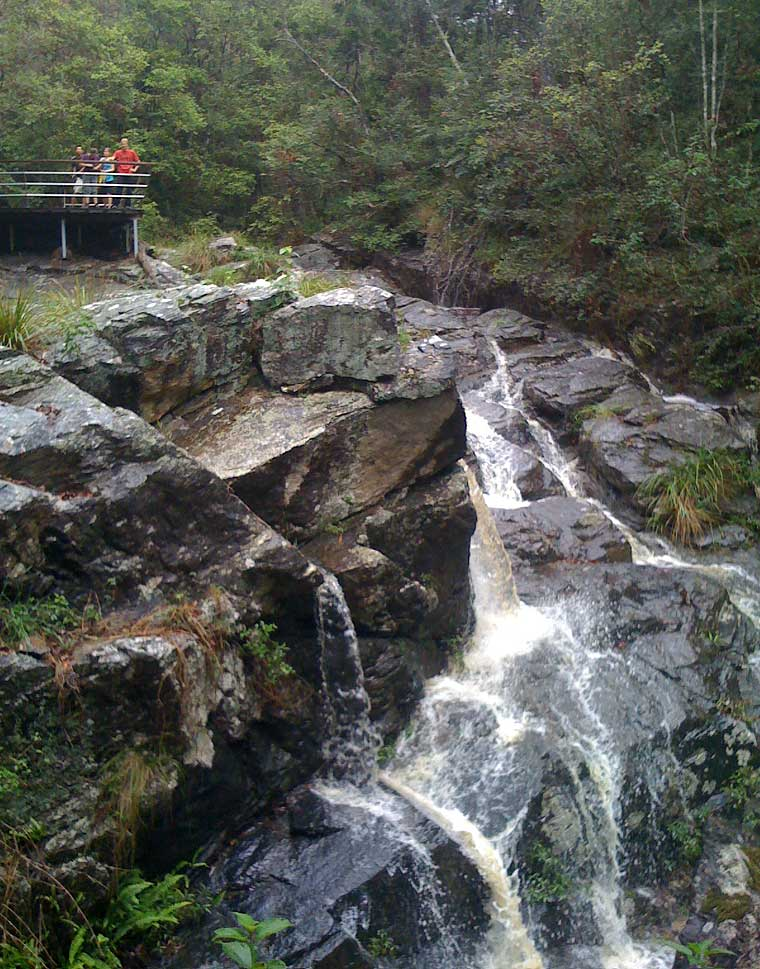
- Sightseers overlooking the JC Slaughter Falls in 2009.

- Location within Queensland
- Location: Brisbane, Queensland, Australia
- Coordinates: 27°27′54″S 152°57′18″E
- Type: Cascade
- Watercourse: West Ithaca Creek

The Simpson Falls, a cascade waterfall on the West Ithaca Creek, is located within the Mount Coot-tha Forest, in Brisbane, Queensland, Australia.

== Location and features ==
The Mount Coot-tha Forest is approximately 1,500 hectares (3,700 acres) of open eucalypt forest forming the south-eastern part of D'Aguilar National Park. These two areas make up a 30,000-hectare (74,000-acre) forest that extends into suburban Brisbane. It is home to powerful owls, goshawks, eagles, wrens and robins as well as possums and bats. Visitor facilities in the forest include picnic tables, barbecues and toilets. The forest may be approached from Sir Samuel Griffith Drive or Gap Creek Road, Mt Coot-tha. Limited parking is available. The area is popular with birdwatchers, who can see white-throated treecreeper, variegated fairy-wren, powerful owl, rose robin and varied sittella.

In 2006 a 58-year-old Bardon woman was walking her dog through the Mount Coot-tha picnic spot Simpson Falls when two dingoes stalked and circled her for a kilometre. Brisbane City Council erected warning signs and set additional traps in response to the incident.

Brisbane City Council occasionally burns sections of bush around Simpson Falls to prevent fuel build up.

== See also ==
- List of waterfalls
- List of waterfalls in Australia
