= Mount Coot-tha Lookout =

Mountain overlook in Queensland, Australia

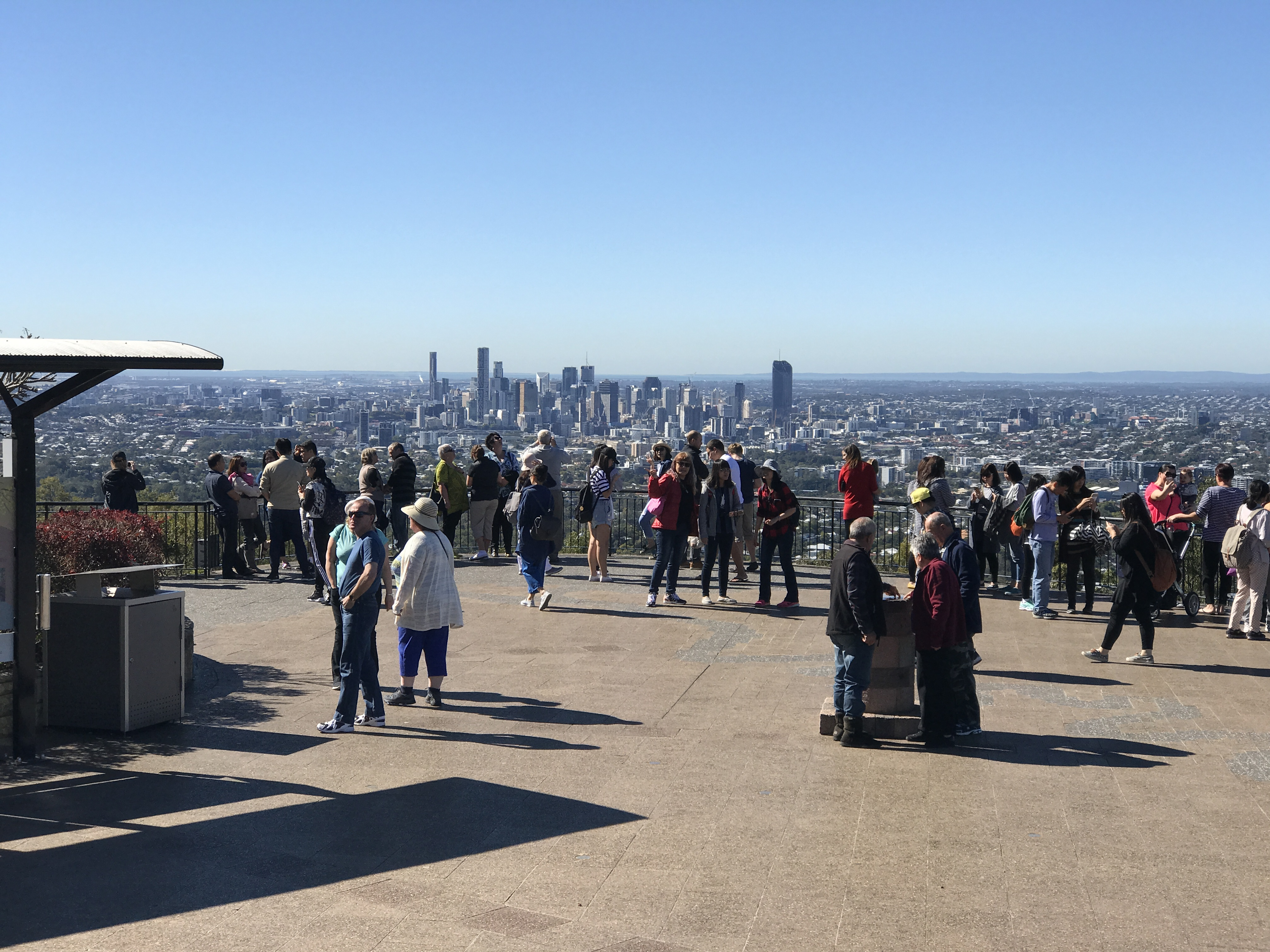
- Mount Coot-tha Lookout with the Brisbane CBD in the distance

- Location within Queensland Location within Australia
- 27.4848°S 152.9592°E
- Location: Sir Samuel Griffith Drive, Mount Coot-tha, City of Brisbane, Queensland, Australia

History
- Design period: 1914–1919 (World War I)
- Built: 1918–c. 1950

Queensland Heritage Register
- Official name: Mt Coot-tha Lookout & Kiosk, One-Tree-Hill
- Type: state heritage (built)
- Designated: 13 January 1995
- Reference no.: 601564
- Significant period: 1918, 1928, 1949–1950 (fabric); 1870s–ongoing (social)
- Significant components: lookout /observation deck, wall/s – retaining, kiosk, tank stand

Mount Coot-tha Lookout & Kiosk is a heritage-listed lookout at Sir Samuel Griffith Drive, Mount Coot-tha, City of Brisbane, Queensland, Australia. At 226 metres (741 ft) above sea level, it is the best known vantage point from which to view the city and surrounds. It was built from 1918 to c. 1950. It is also known as One-Tree-Hill. It was added to the Queensland Heritage Register on 13 January 1995.

== History ==
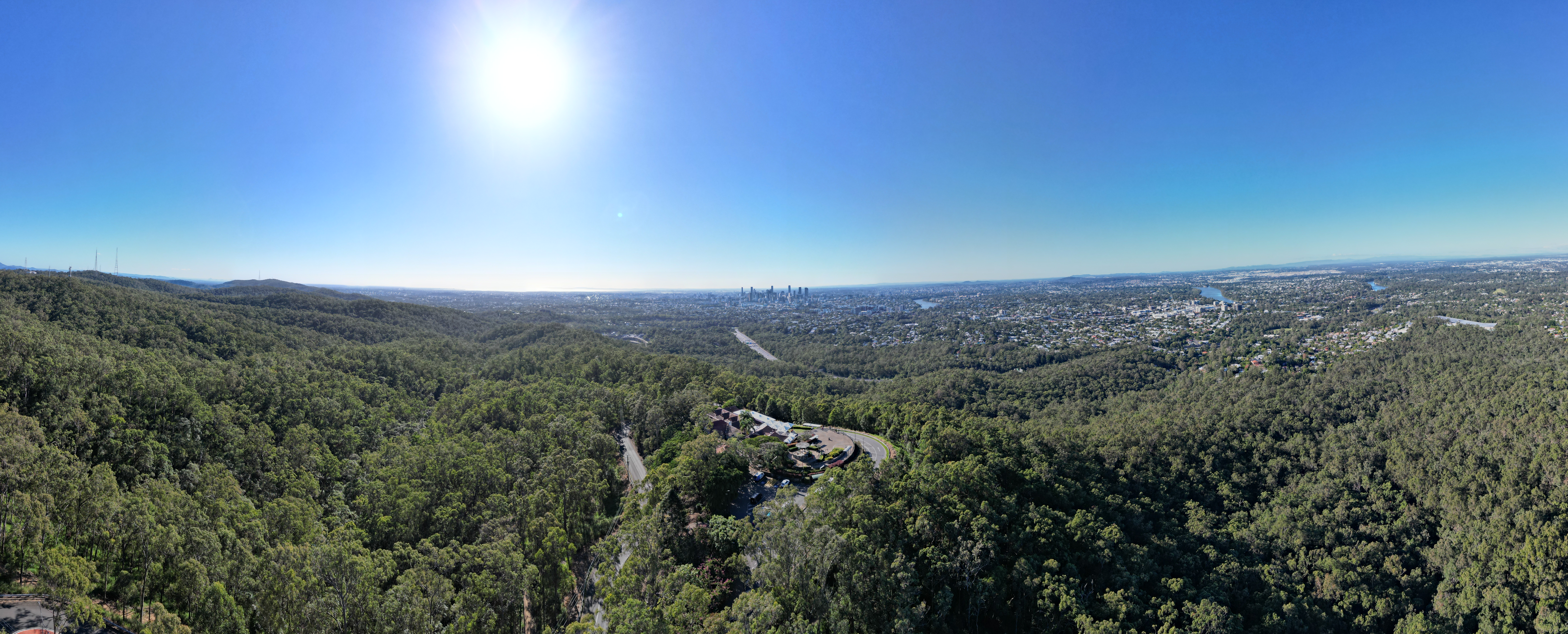
Aerial panorama of Mount Coot-tha's summit lookout

Mount Coot-tha is part of the Taylor Range which forms a backdrop of hills to the City of Brisbane. Mount Coot-tha was previously known as One-Tree-Hill, a reference to when the hill terminated in a bare knoll with a solitary large tree at the summit.

The Taylor Range was originally named Glenmorrison Range by the explorer John Oxley in 1823. In July 1828, this range was referred to as Glenmoriston's Range and Sir Herbert Taylor's Range by the colonial botanist Charles Fraser, and as Glenmorriston's Range by Captain Patrick Logan, Commandant of the penal settlement at Brisbane.

The first recorded ascent by European explorers was on 6 July 1828, with Fraser, Captain Patrick Logan and explorer Allan Cunningham. Fraser's journal describes in detail the species of trees found there, and that the view from the south-east to north-west was extensive and very grand, presenting an immense thinly wooded plain, whose surface was gently undulated, and clothed with luxuriant grass.

A request to purchase One-Tree-Hill in 1865 was refused, and the Surveyor-General replied that it would be required for trigonometrical purposes, and was moreover a point to which inhabitants of this city frequently repaired for recreation on account of the extensive view and fresh air.

The Taylor Range provided a source of good timber and One-Tree-Hill was first proclaimed a reserve for railway purposes on 21 February 1873 in order that the source of timber could be secured for development of the railway from Ipswich to Brisbane. In 1880, One-Tree-Hill, together with the surrounding area of 1,500 acres (610 ha), was placed in charge of a body of Trustees as a reserve for public recreation. It was at this time that the name was changed to Mount Coot-tha. Mr HW Radford, Clerk of the Parliament, and Honorary Secretary to the Trustees of the Public Recreation Reserve, questioned a descendant of earlier members of the aboriginal tribe that frequented that area and discovered that the aboriginal name for the area was Coot-tha or Kuta, the aboriginal name for honey or the place of honey. Hence the name change to its official title of Mount Coot-tha.

The summit was accessed by walking tracks, and by the 1870s some visitors were driving up with horse and carriages. When Mount Coot-tha became a reserve for public recreation, the track was improved to become a steep and windy road. The surviving one-tree was surrounded by a protective fence and in 1886 a shelter shed and water tank was built. Mount Coot-tha was proclaimed a reserve for native birds on 20 December 1890.

The Saturday half-holiday was legislated for in Queensland as part of the 1900 Factory Act. The half-holiday was the beginning of the weekend as an institution, and together with public holidays the popularity of recreation areas and activities increased. With the advent of the motor car, motoring itself became a recreation activity. By 1918, the steep rough bridle tracks of years ago were replaced with well-made roads and paths so that pedestrians and motorists could reach the highest points of Mount Coot-tha easily. This road later became Sir Samuel Griffith Drive.

In 1918, the Trustees of the Reserve requested that the Greater Brisbane Council take over the administration of the area and at this time it is believed that a new kiosk was built next to the existing shelter shed.

=== The kiosk ===
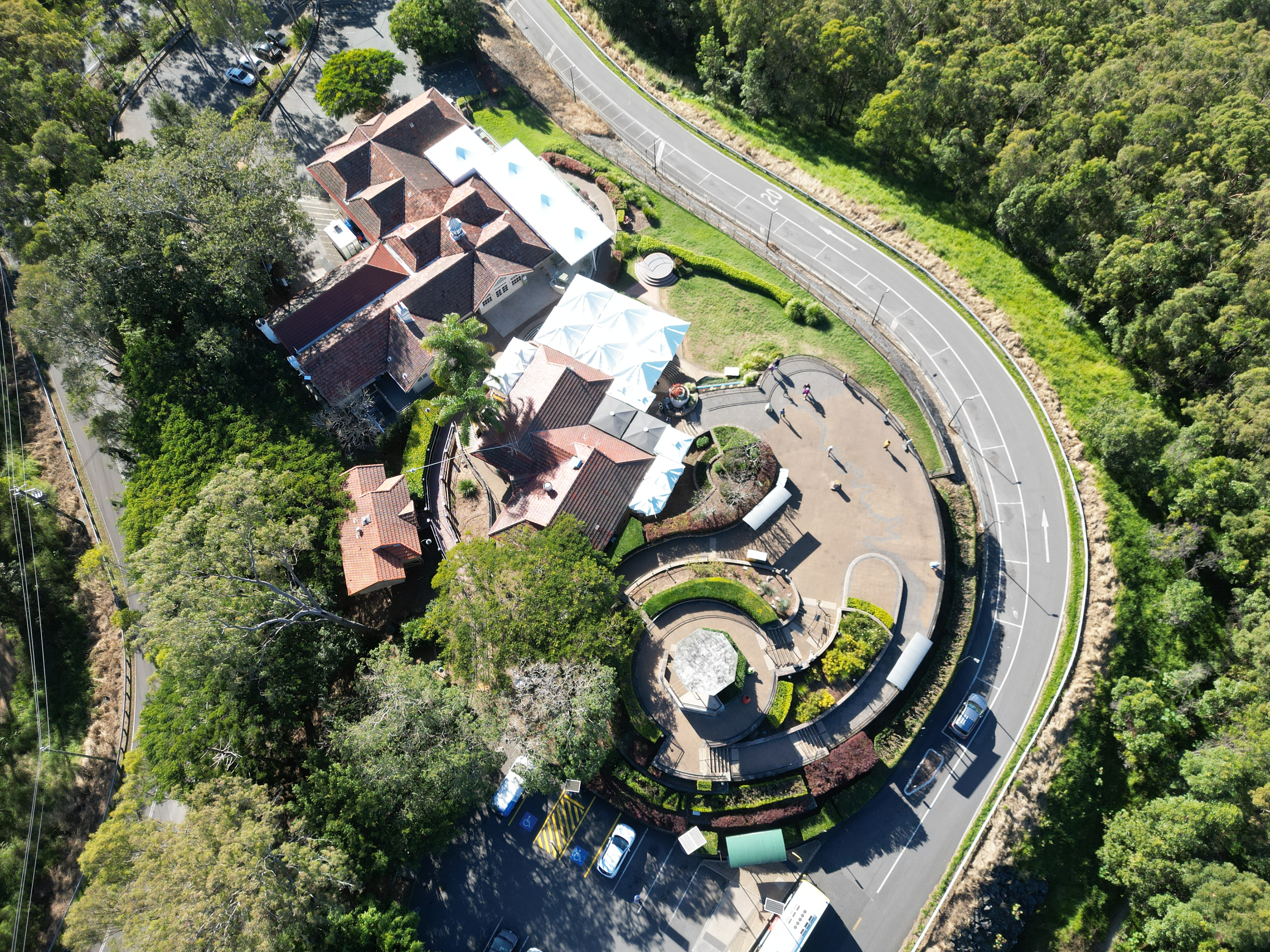
Mount Coot-tha's summit lookout and its kiosks, 2005

The first recorded shelter shed at Mount Coot-tha appears to have been an open sided timber structure and water tank. In May 1886, the Courier reported the completion of the shed, stating the site selected not being unduly exposed, whilst commanding the favourite outlook. Tables, forms, and tanks are all fixed up and the fireplaces are in progress, and as soon as a rainfall gives a supply of water, picnicking parties can avail themselves of all the conveniences provided. The wife of the caretaker of the reserve, who lived in a house about a quarter of a mile below the summit, operated a small kiosk where teas were served to visitors. A small timber kitchen had been built adjacent to the shelter shed by c.1912. A larger open sided kiosk was constructed on the northeast side of the shelter shed c.1918, and this kiosk forms the basis of the present structure. A 1928 plan by Alfred Herbert Foster, Brisbane City Architect 1925–32, shows the position of the shelter shed and adjacent open sided kiosk, and indicates that the small kitchen may have been relocated to form a detached kitchen wing serving the kiosk.

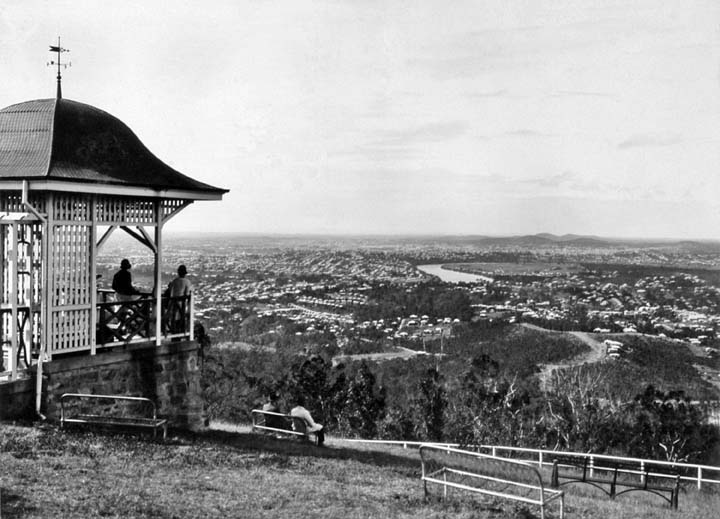
Mount Coot-tha Lookout, 1930

A 1928 design signed by Reyburn Jameson, Brisbane City Assistant Architect 1926–29, repeated the plan form of the existing kiosk to double its size and provide for a two-storeyed timber extension to the northwest to accommodate living quarters. The shelter shed and small kitchen were demolished, the prominent fleche and chimney were added, and the roof resheeted with red fibro cement tiles. The open balustrade nature of the kiosk changed at this time, with the inclusion of sliding multi-paned timber sashes above hand rail level and a fibro cement balustrade below. The enlarged kiosk reflected the increasing popularity and visitor numbers to Mount Coot-tha, and the proliferation of motor transport.

A 1949 design by Brisbane City Architect Frank Gibson Costello shows extensions and alterations to the kitchen and caretakers wing with the annotation town water supply to be extended to high level tank located in a suitable position having in mind the future development of this site. Further work was carried out in 1950, with a design by Costello in May showing a circular drive, new entrance, lounge and lavatories, and later that year extensions to the living quarters and the construction of a high-level timber tankstand. The present terra-cotta roof tiles date from post 1950. As City Architect, Costello also designed the adjoining lookout and raised viewing platform which are typical of the quality of his work for the council, which included the sub-stations at Hamilton, Ashgrove and Newmarket, and the Eagle Farm Pumping Station.

More recently, some internal partitioning has occurred and an entrance pergola and signage have been constructed.

=== The lookout ===
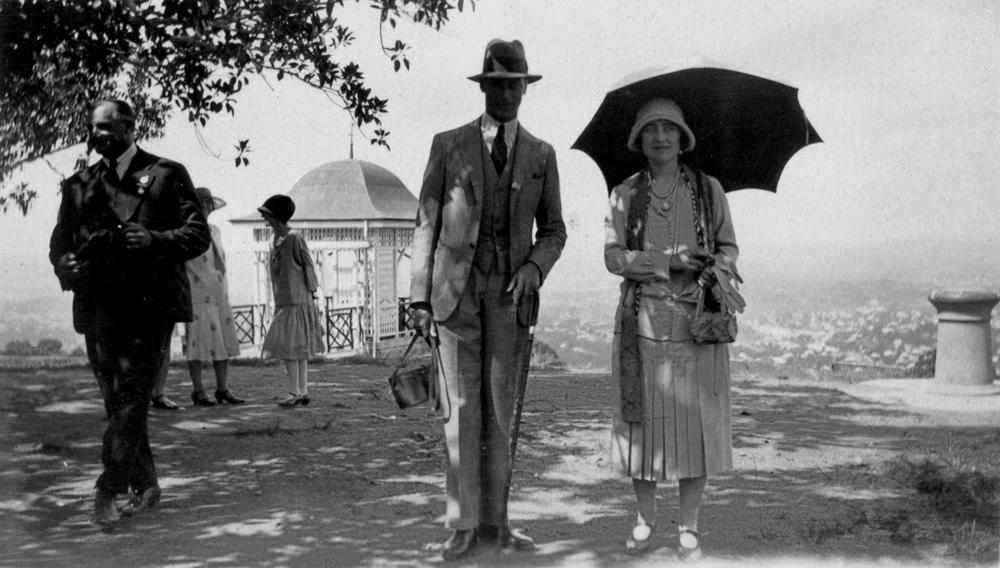
Their Royal Highnesses the Duke and Duchess of York enjoy a morning at Mt. Coot-tha April 1927

Looking at the view has been the most popular and continuing form of recreation on Mount Coot-tha, and in 1882 the Duke of Clarence and Prince George (later King George V) commemorated their visit to Mount Coot-tha by planting two Moreton Bay fig trees on the summit. By 1902 the viewing spot had been formalised by the erection of a stone pillar topped with a metal plate engraved with directional lines pointing to distant landmarks and views. There were also protective railings and a pay-as-you-look telescope.

A small viewing gazebo with an ogee shaped roof, stone base, open balustrades, pergola entrance, and housing a telescope was constructed c.1918. In 1927 the Duke and Duchess of York were photographed visiting Mount Coot-tha standing at the direction finder.

A 1950 design by City Architect Frank Gibson Costello shows a raised viewing platform with a concrete canopy on a stone base, with a large radiating lookout platform above a stone retaining wall. The stand of trees at the summit were cleared for the construction of the lookout platform. The 1950 scheme showed a drinking fountain in place of the current direction finder, and a direction finder located on the raised viewing platform. It was featured on the Bluey episode "The Sign".

== Description ==
The Mount Coot-tha Lookout and Kiosk are located at the summit of Mount Coot-tha fronting Sir Samuel Griffith Drive to the southeast.

=== The kiosk ===
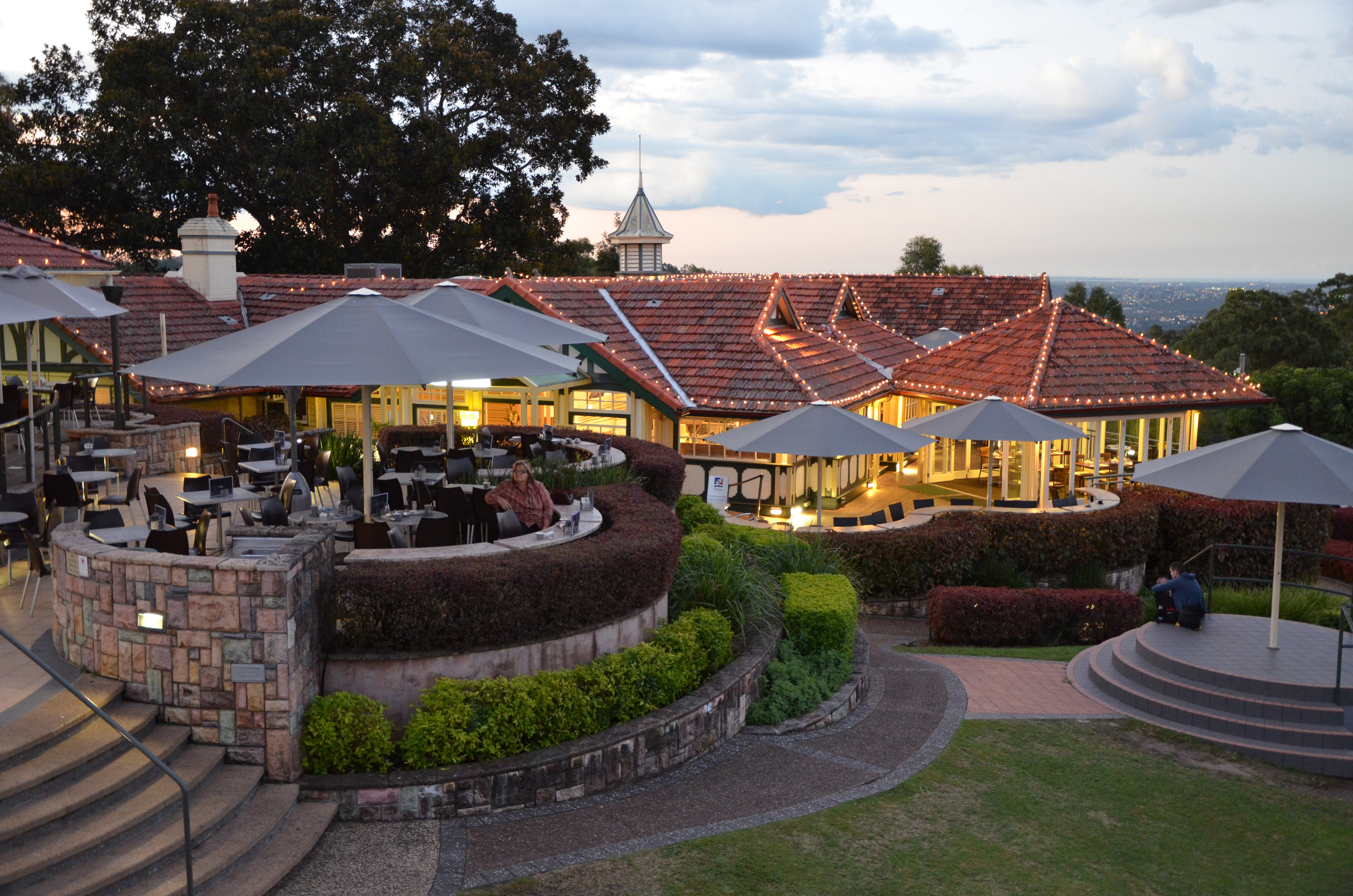
Mount Coot-tha Kiosk, 2011

The kiosk, located to the north of the lookout, is a single-storeyed timber building on a stone base with a terra-cotta tiled gable and half-gable roof. The roof has a prominent central fleche ventilator, terra-cotta finials and chimney pots, and half-timbered gables.

The building has evolved from an open sided kiosk, and the main section is formed by two adjoining similar kiosk structures, with a two-storeyed service wing to the rear and an addition to the northeast. The kiosk section has sliding multi-paned sash windows which can be concealed within the solid balustrade below, and multi-paned fanlight glazing above. The balustrade has fibrous cement panels with timber mouldings. The service wing and northeast addition have weatherboard cladding, with a brick base to the northeast.

A tall timber framed tankstand is located to the north of the building.

=== The lookout ===
View of the Brisbane CBD from the lookout, 2021

The lookout is located at southern and highest end of the site, with views from the south to the northeast. It consists of a large radiating lookout platform above a porphyry stone retaining wall, surrounded by metal balustrading with a raised viewing platform at the southern end.

The octagonal raised viewing platform is located on a stepped base of concentric paths and garden beds with porphyry stone retaining walls. The platform has a terrazzo floor with an inlaid brass star pattern and a concrete canopy supported on steel posts. A carpark is located to the west of the lookout.

== Heritage listing ==
Mount Coot-tha Lookout & Kiosk was listed on the Queensland Heritage Register on 13 January 1995 having satisfied the following criteria.

The place is important in demonstrating the evolution or pattern of Queensland's history.

The Mount Coot-tha Lookout and Kiosk site has been recognised as the best vantage point from which to view the surrounding area since the first recorded European ascent in 1828. Since this time, the growing popularity of visiting the summit has reflected the emergence of leisure and recreation time for the general populace, and the advent and popularity of the motor car.

The place is important in demonstrating the principal characteristics of a particular class of cultural places.

The Kiosk is important as a building which has evolved to meet the changing requirements of use, but has retained the integrity and character of the original structure. The evolution of the Kiosk is displayed in its cohesive and legible form, with the c.1918 structure forming the basis of the present building. The Lookout is representative of a 1950s interpretation of the functionalist idiom.

The place is important because of its aesthetic significance.

Both structures are representative of the high quality of civic architecture produced by the Brisbane City Council Works Department and of the City Architect.

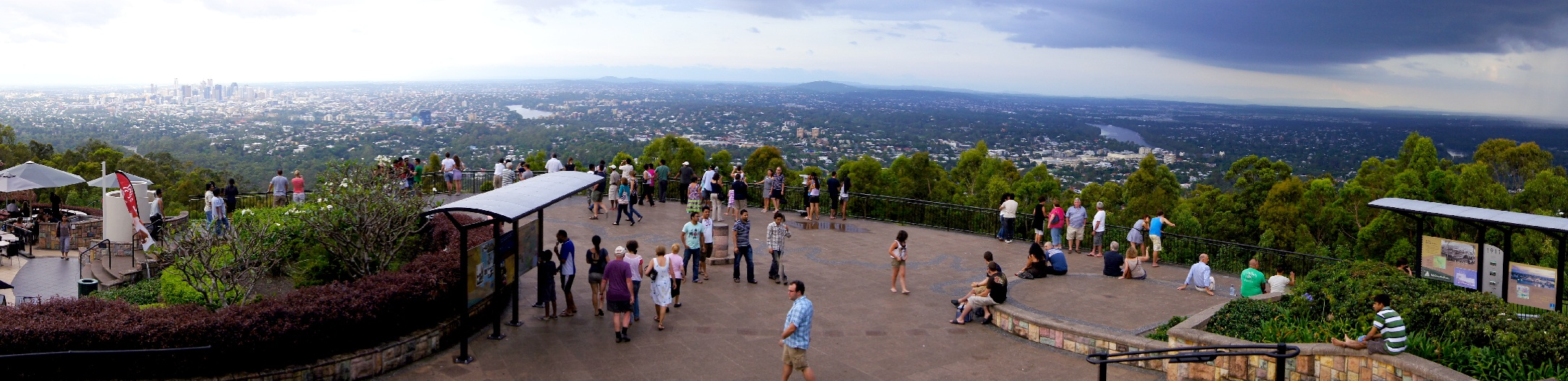
Mount Coot-tha Lookout, 2011
