= Richard Randall Art Studio =

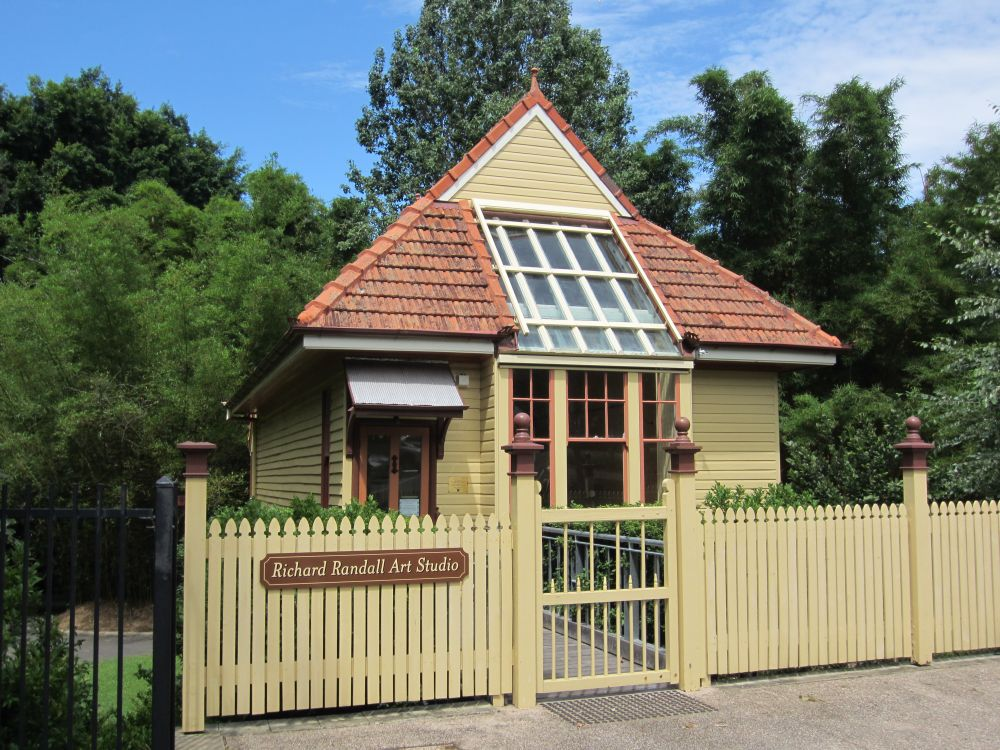
- Richard Randall Art Studio, 2013

- Location within Queensland Location within Australia
- 27.475°S 152.9777°E
- Location: Brisbane Botanic Gardens, Mt Coot-tha Road, Toowong, City of Brisbane, Queensland, Australia

History
- Design period: 1900–1914 (early 20th century)
- Built: c.1900

Queensland Heritage Register
- Official name: Richard Randall Art Studio, Richard Randall's Studio
- Type: state heritage (built)
- Designated: 21 October 1992
- Reference no.: 600299
- Significant period: c. 1900 (fabric); 1900–1906, 1900 onwards (historical)
- Significant components: studio – artist's / craftsman's

Richard Randall Art Studio is a heritage-listed studio at Brisbane Botanic Gardens, Mt Coot-tha Road, Toowong, City of Brisbane, Queensland, Australia. It was built in c.1900. It is also known as Richard Randall's Studio. It was added to the Queensland Heritage Register on 21 October 1992.

== History ==
The Richard Randall Art Studio was purpose-built in 1900 as a two-storey timber studio and residence for Queensland artist Richard John Randall. While located at its original address at 72 Cordelia Street, South Brisbane, it served as the artist's residence, art studio, classroom and gallery for the last 6 years of his life, before his untimely death in 1906 at the age of 37. Subsequently, used as a residence, the upper floor of the studio was saved from demolition in 1988 when it was purchased by the Brisbane City Council and moved to a site in Musgrave Park. In 2007 the studio was relocated for a second time to its current location within the grounds of Brisbane Botanic Gardens at Toowong.

Richard John Randall was born in Brisbane in 1869, the first son of George and Naomi Randall, former domestic servants who had recently emigrated from England to Brisbane. Growing up in South Brisbane, where his parents owned an increasingly successful retail business, Richard and his younger brother George (born in 1871) were both educated at the Brisbane Normal School. Richard went on to attend art classes at the Brisbane Technical College, which had been formed in 1882, operating under the control of the Brisbane School of Arts. While studying there he won awards for drawing and modelling. Watercolors and drawings by Richard were also included in the fine arts section of Queensland National Association exhibitions in the late 1880s.

Queensland's art scene was still in its infancy in the late 19th century. The first art society was formed in 1887, the primary aims of which were to promote the fine arts and to establish annual exhibitions in Brisbane at a time when artists had almost no venues for exhibiting and selling their works. The Society was also seen as an important step towards forming a gallery for Queensland, such as had already been established in Sydney and Melbourne. The first exhibition held by the Society took place in the Masonic Hall in Alice Street, Brisbane, on 14 August 1888.

In 1881 Richard's father George Randall was appointed Queensland Emigration Agent to Britain, a position that required him to take extended tours to England. There, he would travel around the various counties encouraging emigration to Queensland, engaging particularly with agricultural laborers. Between 1881 and 1902, George Randall travelled to England 4 times in the position of Emigration Agent, his longest trip lasting 5 years. In the meantime, the profits from the Randall family's South Brisbane business allowed the family to invest extensively in real estate and establish a large farming property at Birkdale, known as Somersby Grange.

In April 1891, at the age of 22, Richard departed Brisbane with his mother and brother to accompany George Randall on his third tour to England. While there, Richard furthered his art studies and applied to enter a well known art school run by Professor Hubert von Herkomer at Bushey, Hertfordshire. In December 1892 he was accepted into the Herkomer School and spent the next few years there, eventually earning a free scholarship and life membership. In 1895 Richard Randall attained his highest commendation, when one of his watercolor paintings, entitled "The Old Mill", was accepted and exhibited by the Royal Academy of Arts.

After leaving the Herkomer School, Richard Randall spent 18 months working in London, occupying a studio in Queensborough Terrace, Bayswater. During his time there he painted portraits of many eminent gentlemen, as well as making excursions to picturesque spots around England and to Paris.

In 1899 Richard Randall returned to Queensland, the purpose of which (according to some sources) was "to carry out his father's patriotic wish, that now he had received some training and experience he should go back and use this and his talent to help lift art matters in his native city and country". Richard continued to pursue his career as an artist in Brisbane, becoming involved in exhibitions and competitions. In November 1899 he exhibited 50 of his water-colors for sale in Messrs Isles, Love and Co.'s auction mart, in relation to which he was described as a "daring colourist". The influence of Randall's style upon other artists was soon observed in local exhibitions.

Richard Randall set about establishing his own residence and studio in Brisbane soon after his return. The site chosen was a block of land owned by his father at 72 Cordelia Street in South Brisbane, opposite St Andrew's Church of England. Purchased in May 1884, a residence (known as 'Hatfield') was built on the site c. 1896 and early photographs show this residence and the later studio standing close together on the site. Some sources state that the studio was built for Richard Randall by his father, however as George Randall was in England at the time of its construction in 1900, the level of his involvement in the project (beyond providing the land) is unclear. A 1914 account of Richard Randall's life states that Richard personally superintended the erection of the studio.

As a purpose-built studio, rather than an adaptation of an existing building, it is likely that the building's design was based upon the type of artists' studios constructed in parts of London in the late 19th and early 20th century. Favouring the Queen Anne Revival style, these artists' studios were either part of or attached to a single house, or constructed as groups of units. In studio houses, the domestic function of the house was separate from and secondary to its studio use, with the studio itself usually located on the upper floor. Common features of artists' studios included a substantially sized painting room (that served as both a working and entertaining space), and large windows and skylights for adequate natural light, controlled by blinds. In particular, a window joined to an inclined skylight was very popular as it provided both top and side light. Careful consideration was also given to circulation, with an entrance located close to the painting room so that models and visitors would not have to pass through other areas of the house. Purpose-built artists' studios, whether grand or modest, were a reflection of the improved social and professional status of artists working in London in the late Victorian period.

While modest in size and incorporating local materials and construction techniques, the Randall studio's design reflects many of the aspects of a typical London artist's studio, which Richard Randall would have been familiar with, having lived and worked there for some time. Its style, described in a Brisbane newspaper article as resembling a "Swiss chalet", incorporates characteristics of Australian "Queen Anne" style, such as an asymmetrical facade, steeply pitched Marseilles tile-clad roof, terracotta roof apex ornaments, a street-facing gable, and projecting bay window with multi-paneled top lights. Built on steeply sloping ground, the studio occupied the upper floor at street level and the residence below was accessed by an external staircase at the rear. The residential level consisted of at least four rooms connected by a side verandah, however its exact layout is unknown. The studio itself was a single volume lit by a large bay window and skylight in the centre of the main elevation, with blinds to control light levels. A part-height timber partition wall created an entrance passageway, with a curtain hung across it to shield views into the studio from the front door. The high walls (painted a "cool green") had few windows, providing ample hanging space for pictures, and the room contained a "model's throne". A contemporary description called it "a fine commodious studio (said to be one of the best-equipped private studios in Australia)".

Richard Randall's studio was not the first artist's studio to be constructed in Queensland, however free-standing, purpose-built studio buildings remained rare, constructed only by those able to afford it. Of the many practicing artists and photographers working in Brisbane at the time, most operated from existing commercial premises. One known exception was the English-born artist Godfrey Rivers, appointed second art master at the Brisbane Technical College in 1890, who built a wooden studio building in the grounds of the Brisbane School of Arts in 1891 to a design by George Henry Male Addison. His studio was described as "a wooden building of one room, lofty, sufficiently spacious, and admirably lighted by a single fine south window" (building no longer extant).

Once settled into his new studio residence, Richard Randall began advertising for pupils in the Brisbane Courier, offering drawing and painting lessons in a variety of mediums, including oils, water-colors and pastels. On Wednesday afternoons he was "at home" to visitors, providing an opportunity for socialising and displaying his latest works. Richard worked, exhibited and taught at the studio, establishing a reputation as a popular and successful Brisbane artist and teacher, and providing a focus for a coterie of local artists influenced by the Randall style.

When he was not teaching, Richard travelled around south-east Queensland in search of new subjects and scenes to paint. He also took an active role in many artistic clubs and societies, including the Brisbane Sketching Club and the Queensland Art Society, of which he was vice-president from December 1903. A breakaway art society, calling itself the New Society of Artists, formed in 1904, as a result of dissatisfaction with some policies of the more elite Queensland Art Society. In August 1906, the engagement of Richard Randall to Miss Minna Wirth, daughter of one of the founders of the Queensland Art Society, artist Lewis Wirth, was announced in a local paper.

Some time after his return to Australia, Richard received overtures from various London art galleries, and subsequently collections of his works were sent back to England and displayed for purchase. His watercolors and paintings of Australian landscapes and scenery were particularly admired, as they conveyed "a more pleasing and favourable impression of the Australian bush and scenery than had hitherto been entertained".

Tragedy struck in October 1906 when Richard Randall died unexpectedly, of what is believed to have been a brain tumor, at Somersby Grange, aged 37. The funeral held on 16 October was well attended by members of Brisbane's artistic circles, including representatives of the Queensland Art Society and the New Society of Artists, who, in a rare moment of unity between the two groups, acted as pall bearers.

Richard's death came as a great shock to his father, who spent much of his time after 1906 promoting the life and works of his son. In 1907 he compiled and published an elaborate memorial brochure, featuring photographs of Richard, his studio and some of his paintings. The studio and its contents were kept intact until c. 1913, and opened for viewing by the public and eminent guests, such as Govennor and Lady Chelmsford, who visited in December 1906 and purchased several watercolor sketches.

In 1909 the South Brisbane City Council was persuaded to accept 600 of Richard's works in perpetual trust. A quarter-acre of vacant land adjoining the studio was offered by George Randall as a location for a gallery to house the collection, however it was eventually housed on the upper floor of the South Brisbane Library, which had been converted from a library space into the Randall Art Gallery. The Randall Collection contained everything from early and incomplete works and sketches to his most prized paintings. After 1922 the collection was added to by George Randall upon his return from a visit to England, where he had purchased a number of his son's paintings from a London art gallery.

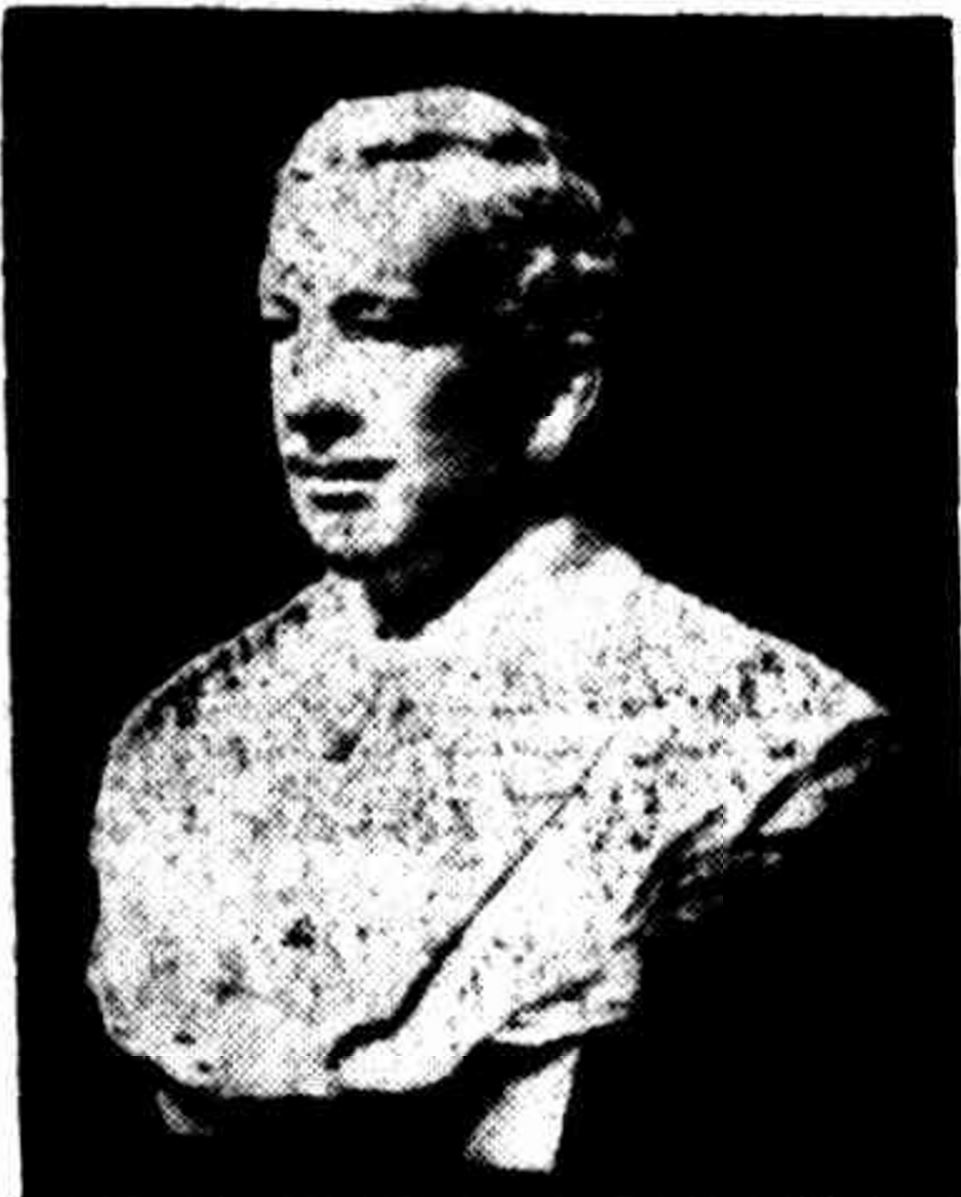
Memorial bust of Richard Randall, 1925

In 1925, sculptor Charles Lowther was commissioned to make a memorial bust of Randall. The bust was unveiled on 19 June 1925 by the Queensland Governor Matthew Nathan at Randall's studio.

When the City Council of Greater Brisbane was formed in 1925 it took over the assets of the South Brisbane Council, including the Randall Collection, which was moved to Brisbane City Hall. Some paintings were hung in reception rooms, while the majority were displayed in a large, well-lit room on the fifth floor. The collection's continuous occupation of the foremost gallery space in Brisbane caused friction between the council, representatives of the Randall family and the Royal Queensland Art Society, who requested to use the gallery for other purposes. In 1943, after being closed for a year due to lack of staff, the collection was removed from the gallery and stored in the City Hall basement. After the end of World War II, the collection was not reinstated to the gallery and the majority of works remained in poor storage conditions in the basement, or were loaned out or taken without any record being kept of where they went. A 1953 newspaper article claimed that the paintings were being eaten by rats and falling into disrepair; however it was not until the mid-1980s that a concerted effort was made to track down and restore the collection, which had dwindled to 154 pieces. In 2013 the Richard Randall collection remains part of the Brisbane City Council owned Museum of Brisbane art collection.

Members of the Randall family retained ownership of the Cordelia Street property until 1981. From late 1913 the studio was rented out as a residence, and at some point the upper floor was partitioned. In a 1926 sewerage plan the studio is named "Brindisi" and is fenced off from two other residences on the property.

In 1987, Richard Randall's Studio was listed by the National Trust of Queensland, who described it as "a unique example of a purpose-built artist's studio and reception rooms".

In 1988 the building was threatened with demolition due to redevelopment of the site; however it was purchased in time by Brisbane City Council in recognition of its historical significance. Only the upper floor (the former studio) was saved and relocated approximately 300 metres (980 ft) along Cordelia Street to Musgrave Park, while the remainder of the building was demolished. In 1989 the studio was stumped and re-orientated to a north-west aspect to face an avenue through the park. Internal partitions and a lowered ceiling were removed and the building was repaired and renovated, with facilities such as a small kitchenette installed in a rear corner. In front of the studio a timber picket fence, similar to one which had existed at the original location, was constructed.

The studio was officially opened by the Lord Mayor Sallyanne Atkinson, in December 1990 as the Richard Randall Studio, part of the Jagera Arts Centre in Musgrave Park. The Richard Randall Artist's Studio Award, established by the council the same year, provided rent-free use of the building to selected local artists for set periods as a studio and gallery. Artists were chosen by a panel of professional arts community representatives, and were required to produce a quota of artwork for public use during their residency.

By the mid-2000s the studio was in need of repairs and had become vulnerable to damage by vandals. In 2007 it was relocated for the second time by Brisbane City Council to its present site in the Mt Coot-tha Botanic Gardens, adjacent to the main visitor's car park. Officially opened on 6 October 2008 by the Lady Mayoress Mrs Lisa Newman, in the presence of descendants of the Randall family, the renovated studio is used as a function and exhibition venue available to the public and community groups for hire.

== Description ==
The Richard Randall Art Studio is a small, single-story, timber-framed building located within the grounds of Brisbane Botanic Gardens Mt Cooth-tha in Toowong. Set against a backdrop of mature trees and bamboo, the building is adjacent to and clearly visible from the car park in the northern area of the Gardens.

High-set on timber and steel stumps over sloping ground, the building is orientated to face south-west and sited to accommodate a level timber and steel walkway from the car park to the front door on the left-hand side of the main elevation. A timber picket fence and gate, constructed in the style of the fence at the studio's original location, stands at the edge of the footpath, with a garden bed behind. Trees and grassed lawns surround the remainder of the building.

Measuring approximately 6 by 14 metres (20 by 46 ft), the studio building is rectangular in plan with a narrow frontage and a small verandah at the rear. The steeply pitched roof is clad in red Marseilles tiles with terracotta finials and metal acroteria, and has timber lined eaves, 0.5 metres (1 ft 8 in) wide. The front section of the roof has a half gable, while the rear is hipped, extending over the rear verandah.

Centrally located immediately below the front half gable is a large rectangular inclined skylight supported by timber mullions, the bottom of which meets the top of a projecting bay window. This tripartite window consists of a central sash window with casements on either side. The upper portion of all 3 windows is multi-paneled, while the lower portions have a single pane. Both the skylight and the bay window have modern roller blind systems attached to the outside.

The studio has only two other small windows, one on each side elevation. These are timber, double-hung sashes with multi-pane upper lights and a single pane lower light, one on the north-west wall next to the main entry and one on the south-east wall near the rear corner.

The front elevation is clad in timber chamferboards, and the sides with weatherboards. The rear verandah wall retains exposed timber studs, however the southern end has had a modern accessible bathroom inserted within the verandah space. This bathroom is clad with flat sheeting and the verandah?s two-rail dowel balustrade and stop-chamfered posts are retained.

A small sunhood over the entrance is supported by curved timber brackets and clad in mini-orb sheeting, positioned higher than its original location. The low-waisted, 4-panel timber door features some early door hardware, including a central door knob and a door knocker, and has glazed upper panels. Two short posts with ornamental tops incorporated into the door's architrave are the remnants of the original front stair balustrade.

The interior of the studio is a single large room, well-lit by the large bay window and inclined skylight. An entrance hall area is formed by a timber partition wall that extends 2.6 metres (8 ft 6 in) into the room, topped by wide timber boards that act as shelves, partly supported by a small turned timber column.

The high ceiling is coved, with the tie beams of the roof framing exposed through the space. These beams are stop-chamfered and the end beams braced in each corner. The ceiling and walls are lined with timber, v-jointed tongue and groove boards, and the floor with polished timber boards.

Fittings and fixtures within the space include a contemporary aluminium rail for picture hanging, reproduction suspended and wall light fittings, switches and power outlets, and strip lighting fitted discreetly to the upper side of the tie beams. A small kitchenette and fridge are located in the south-eastern corner.

The door to the rear verandah is a contemporary 4 panel timber door, located at the northern end of the north-east wall. The verandah floor is lined with linoleum and the raked ceiling is clad in timber v-jointed boards.

The underfloor area of the studio is used as storage space and is enclosed with vertical timber battens.

== Heritage listing ==
Richard Randall Art Studio was listed on the Queensland Heritage Register on 21 October 1992 having satisfied the following criteria.

The place is important in demonstrating the evolution or pattern of Queensland's history.

The Richard Randall Art Studio (1900) is important in demonstrating the evolution and growth of artistic culture in Queensland in the late 19th and early 20th century. Constructed for an aspiring young Queensland artist who had studied and worked in England, the studio is representative of the confidence felt by members of Brisbane's artistic elite in the future of Queensland as a place of culture and artistic inspiration.

The studio building has served as an important venue for the education and professional development of both artists and art students in Queensland, initially under the tutelage of the studio's first owner, Richard Randall, and since the late 1980s as a workshop and exhibition space available to the public.

The place demonstrates rare, uncommon or endangered aspects of Queensland's cultural heritage.

As the surviving portion of Richard Randall's purpose-built studio and residence, the Richard Randall Art Studio is an example of a building type that is and always has been rare in Queensland. The building is the only known artist's studio of its type from the early 20th century remaining in Queensland, built in a period when most professional artists worked from existing commercial premises.

The place is important in demonstrating the principal characteristics of a particular class of cultural places.

The Richard Randall Art Studio demonstrates the principal characteristics of a purpose-built artist's studio, with a single large internal volume able to accommodate a variety of functions and arrangements of furniture and objects; large plain wall surfaces for displaying artworks; and strategically placed windows and skylight to provide southern light, controlled by blinds. Based upon the type of artist's studio that was common in London in the late 19th century, the studio's design is illustrative of the ideal working environment preferred by professional artists of the period.

The place has a special association with the life or work of a particular person, group or organisation of importance in Queensland's history.

The Richard Randall Art Studio has a special association with the Queensland artist Richard John Randall. A popular and influential artist in his day, Richard Randall made an important contribution to the advancement of art and culture in Queensland through his artworks, teaching and his involvement with leading art societies and clubs. Designed especially for him, the studio was where he lived, worked, taught and exhibited his works for the last 6 years of his life, and where his works were displayed for a further 7 years after his death. The collection of his works, donated by the Randall family to the local authorities in perpetual trust, formed the foundation of the Brisbane City Council's art collection.
