= Abigail Allwood =

Australian geologist and astrobiologist

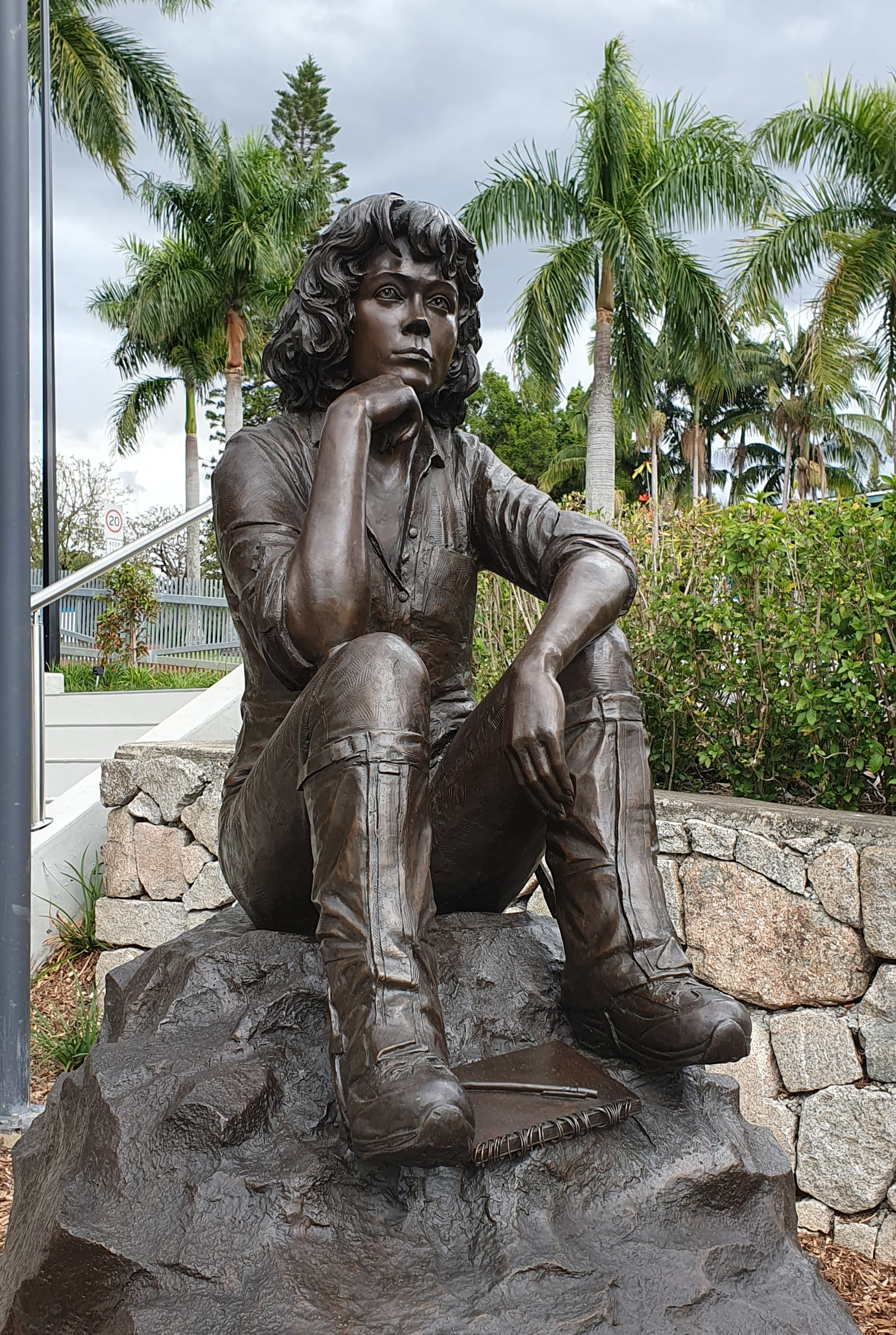
- Citizenship: Australian
- Education: Macquarie University; Queensland University of Technology
- Known for: Principal Investigator of PIXL on the Mars 2020 Rover mission
- Scientific career
- Workplaces: Astrobiologist in NASA's Jet Propulsion Laboratory

Abigail Allwood is an Australian geologist and astrobiologist at the NASA Jet Propulsion Laboratory (JPL) who studies stromatolites, detection of life on other planets, and evolution of life on early Earth. Her early work gained notability for finding evidence of life in 3.45 billion year old stromatolites in the Pilbara formation in Australia, which was featured on the cover of the journal Nature. She is now one of seven principal investigators on the Mars Rover 2020 team searching for evidence of life on Mars using the Planetary Instrument for X-Ray Lithochemistry (PIXL). Allwood is the first female and first Australian principal investigator on a NASA Mars mission.

== Early life and education ==
Allwood grew up in Brisbane, Australia, and was inspired by Carl Sagan and his description of the Voyager missions in the series Cosmos. She attended high school at Somerville House and graduated in 1990. She went on to accomplish an undergraduate degree in geosciences, and completed her PhD at Macquarie University in Australia in 2006 under the advisement of Dr. Malcolm Walter. During her PhD, she published on 3.45 billion years old stromatolites in the Pilbara formation, describing the diversity of early life on the Archean Earth. In 2006 Allwood's research into micro fossils won her a position at California Institute of Technology in Pasadena, working with geologist John Grotzinger. She went on to do postdoctoral work at JPL, where she is currently a principal investigator for NASA on the Mars 2020 mission, with the rover named Perseverance.

== Research ==
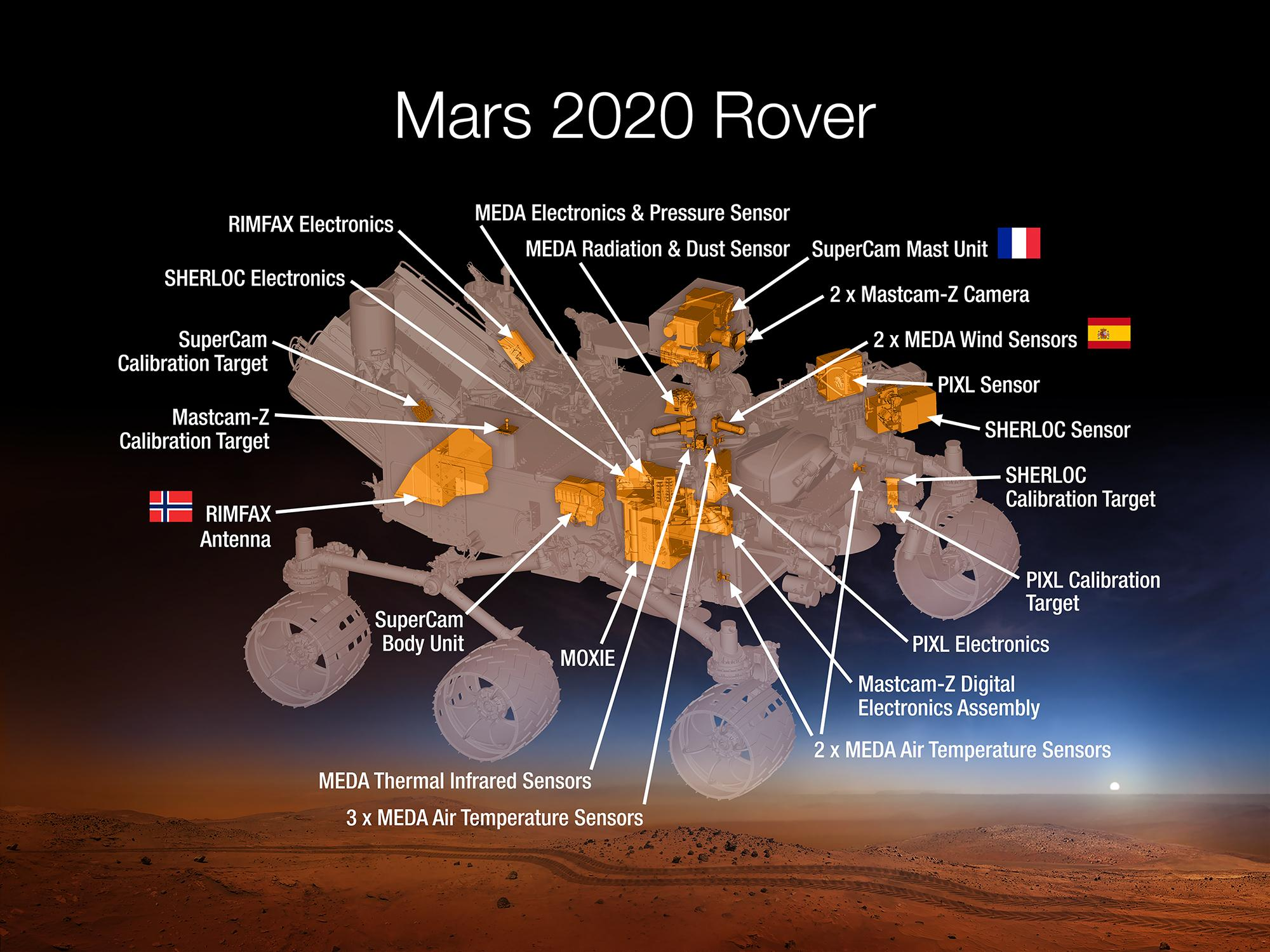
Science Instruments on NASA's Mars 2020 Rover including the PIXL

Allwood has published extensively on characterizing stromatolites using various techniques. In 2018, she published a study of 3.7 billion years old metasedimentary rocks in the Isua formation in Greenland. In this study, she and colleagues analyzed structures which were previously determined to be biogenic stromatolites. However, Allwood concluded that the putatively biogenic structures were structures caused by deformation, receiving media attention.

Allwood led the research and development of the instrument that scans rocks for chemical signatures of life – the PIXL, miniaturising a similar instrument used to analyse the Pilbara rocks, for inclusion on the Mars Rover searching for chemical traces left by ancient microbes.

She has also been involved in other aspects of the Rover missions to collect rock samples on Mars, and return them to Earth for analysis.

Allwood's PIXL team of engineers at JPL and the Queensland University of Technology (QUT) have also created software to process data sent from Mars.

== Awards ==
- Science and Technology Award 2020 - Finalist
- Advance Science and Technology Award 2020 - Winner
- Advance Global Australian Award 2020 - Winner
- Queensland University of Technology Alumnus of the year
- Lew Allen Award for Excellence 2013
- JPL Outstanding Postdoc Award 2008

== Public Recognition ==
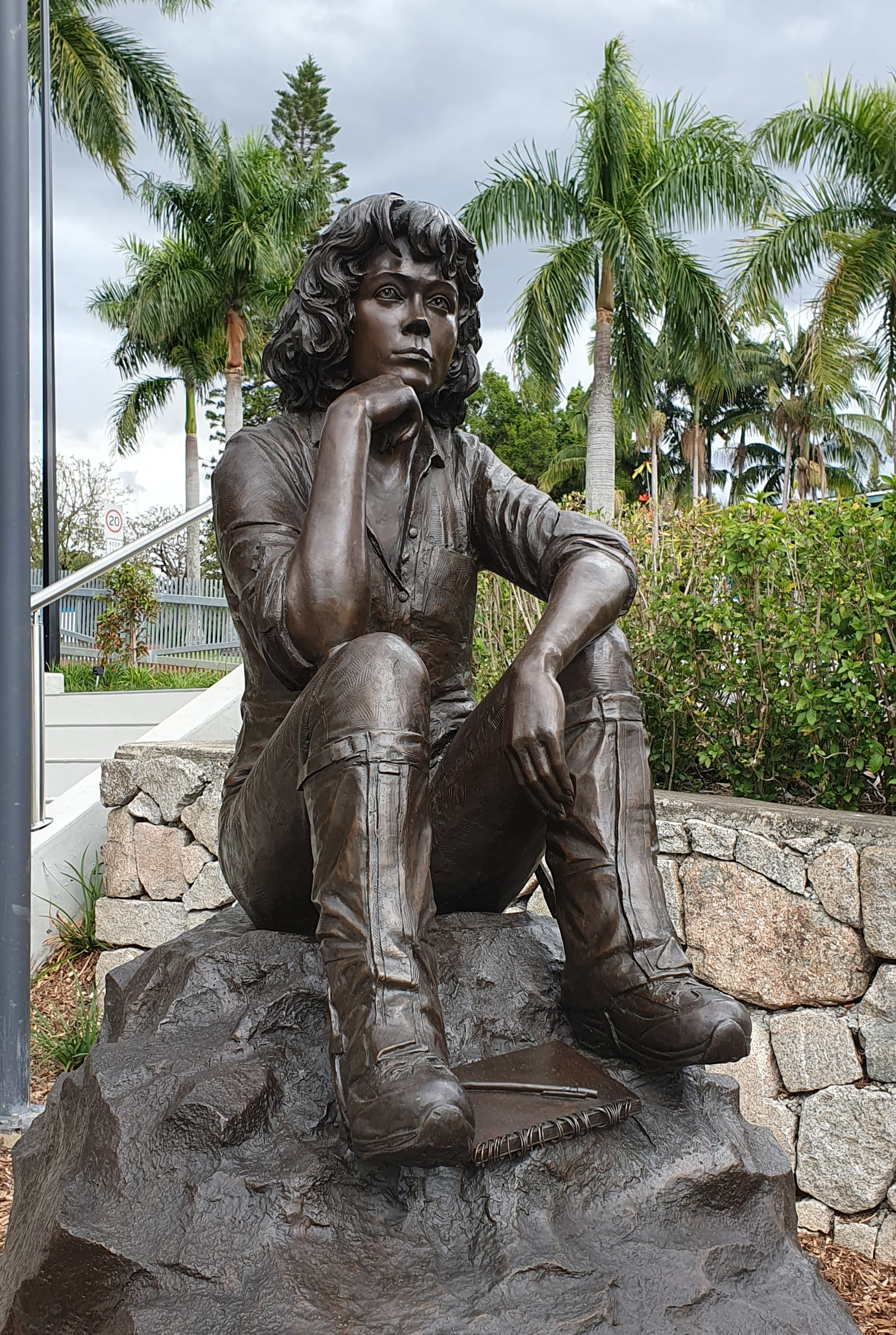
Statue of Dr Allwood on a rock, with notebook and pen at her feet.

In October 2023, a statue of Dr Allwood was erected in the Brisbane Botanic Gardens, Mount Coot-tha, close to the Sir Thomas Brisbane Planetarium. The plaque for the statue reads:

Abigail Allwood

Gillie and Marc, 2023

Bronze

Brisbane-born Doctor Abigail Allwood is an internationally recognised geologist and astrobiologist. Her early work gained notability for uncovering the earliest evidence of life on Earth. During her exceptional career, she joined NASA's Jet Propulsion Laboratory where she developed new ways to analyse the composition of rocks and soil on Mars and help provide crucial insights about Mars' history and habitability. Subsequently, Dr Allwood became the first Australian and first female scientific lead on a Mars mission.

In recognition of her distinguished career in science, this statue depicts Dr Allwood deep in contemplation, equipped with her geological tools.

Suitably located at Brisbane City Council's Sir Thomas Brisbane Planetarium, this sculpture of Dr Allwood was initiated by Brisbane resident, Malia Knox, who campaigned to recognise more females of note in public spaces. This sculpture was funded by Women in Technology Ltd (WiT) through a community campaign, with support from the Queensland Government. WiT donated the sculpture to Brisbane City Council to inspire future female scientists.

== See also ==
- List of women in leadership positions on astronomical instrumentation projects
