= Brisbane Botanic Gardens =

There are two major botanic gardens in Brisbane, Australia:

- The City Botanic Gardens, Gardens Point in the CBD, founded in 1855
- The Brisbane Botanic Gardens, Mount Coot-tha, Toowong, established in 1970
