= Gwendolyn Grant (artist) =

Australian artist

Gwendolyn Muriel Grant (1877–1968) was an Australian artist, who worked mostly in portrait work in the Impressionist style. Many of her works have coastal or beach scenes, in addition to formal portraits and she was part of a vanguard of women exhibiting their work in Australia.

== Early life ==
Gwendolyn Muriel Stanley (later known by her married name Grant) was born on 24 May 1877 in Ipswich, Queensland, to Scottish born Montague Stanley, a station manager and his wife Maud Craig. Her grandfather was an artist and actor in Scotland, and her uncles were architect F.D.G. Stanley and railway engineer H.C. Stanley. After the death of her mother in 1879, Gwendolyn was raised by members of her mother's family in Brisbane. She was educated at the Miss Clark's School in Toowong and then studied art at Brisbane Technical College under Godfrey Rivers. She entered the Royal Queensland Art Society’s annual exhibition in 1899.

== Career ==
Stanley worked as a governess at several stations in northern Queensland from 1902, as well as pursuing painting. She held a solo exhibition in Brisbane in 1906. The following year she travelled to Melbourne to study at the National Gallery school under the instruction of Bernard Hall, Frederick McCubbin and Leslie Wilkie. She returned to Brisbane in 1912. Stanley shared a studio with Vida Lahey, taught classes and served on the Art Society’s council. She married fellow artist William Grant in Brisbane in 1915, who referred to her as “Stan”, and continued her artistic work, whilst raising their two children. Both William and Gwendolyn were made Life Members of the Society

Gwendolyn Grant was president of the Brisbane Lyceum Club in 1923. She wrote for the local newspapers on art and exhibited her works with the Victorian Artists Society and Society of Women Painters. She regularly entered the Archibald Prize competition. She exhibited her works in 15 solo exhibitions and 4 with her husband. She taught art at the Brisbane CTC until she was 75.

== Legacy ==
Grant died on 17 April 1968 in Brisbane and was survived by her two children. Her works are held in the University of Queensland Art Museum and Queensland Art Gallery.

A retrospective of she and her husband's work was published - Gwendolyn and W.G. Grant : their art and life in 1990. Her work was featured in the Brisbane Museum's 2019-2020 exhibition on women artists.
