= James Vincent Duhig =

Australian pathologist

Dr. James Vincent Duhig, c. 1940

James Vincent Duhig (1889–1963) was an Australian pathologist.

In Brisbane, he established the first pathology laboratories at the Mater Misericordiae Hospital and the Brisbane General Hospital.

He campaigned successfully to establish a medical school in Queensland (now the University of Queensland Mayne Medical School). He was the University of Queensland's first professor of pathology from 1938 to 1947. He founded the Red Cross Blood Bank in Queensland. He was the Australian President of the Association of Clinical Pathologists and campaigned for the establishment the College of Pathologists of Australia.

Duhig was also recognised as an art aficionado and critic who wrote for The Bulletin, and president of the Royal Queensland Art Society 1937–1946. He donated a collection of books to the Darnell Collection, University of Queensland.

He was the nephew of James Duhig, the Roman Catholic Archbishop of Brisbane, but it was a problematic relationship for the Archbishop as his nephew was a secular rationalist.
