= Sir Thomas Brisbane Planetarium =

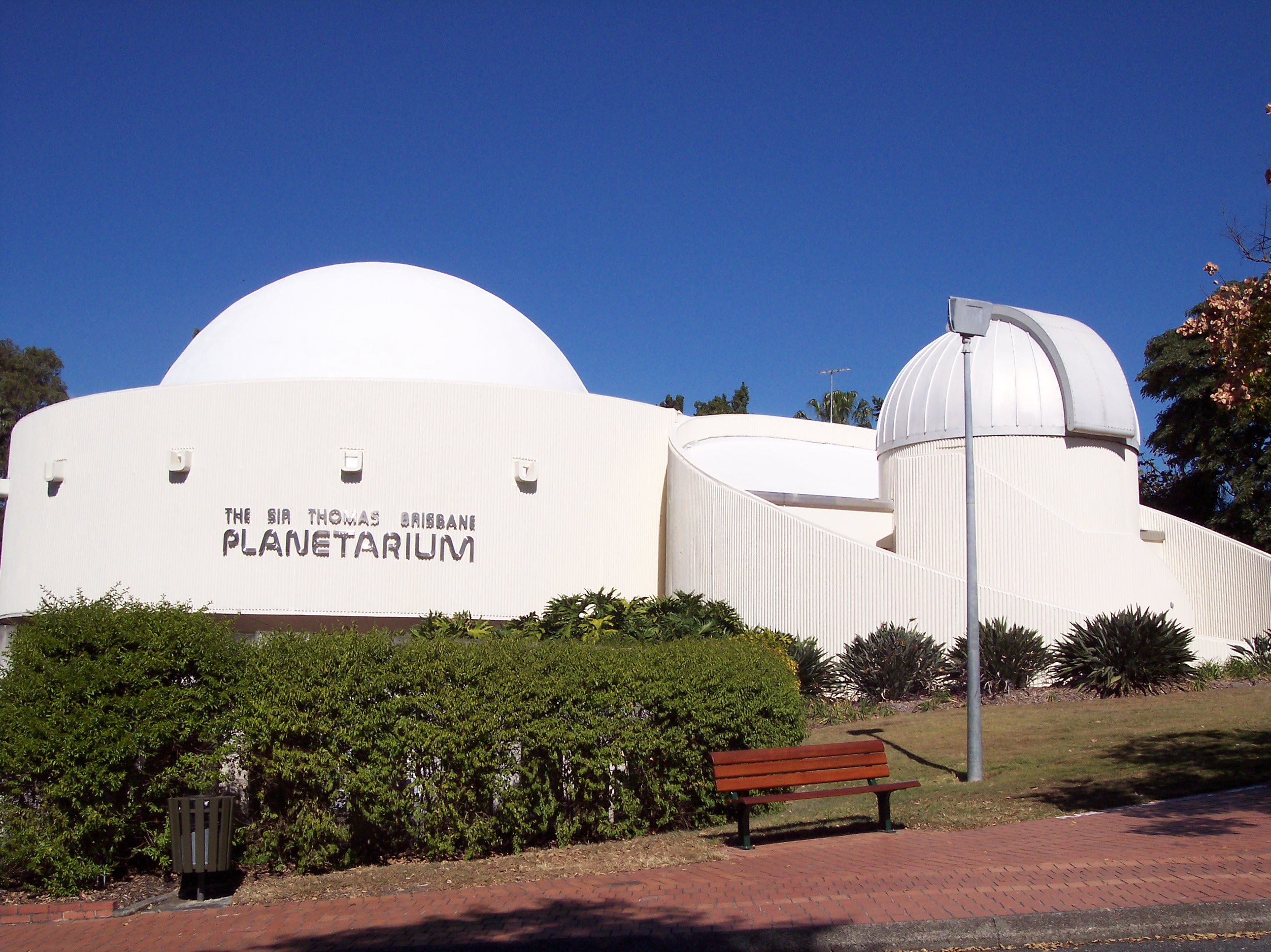
- Established: 1978
- Location: Brisbane Botanic Gardens, Mount Coot-tha, Brisbane, Queensland, Australia
- Coordinates: 27.475732°S 152.976964°E
- Type: Planetarium
- Website: Sir Thomas Brisbane Planetarium

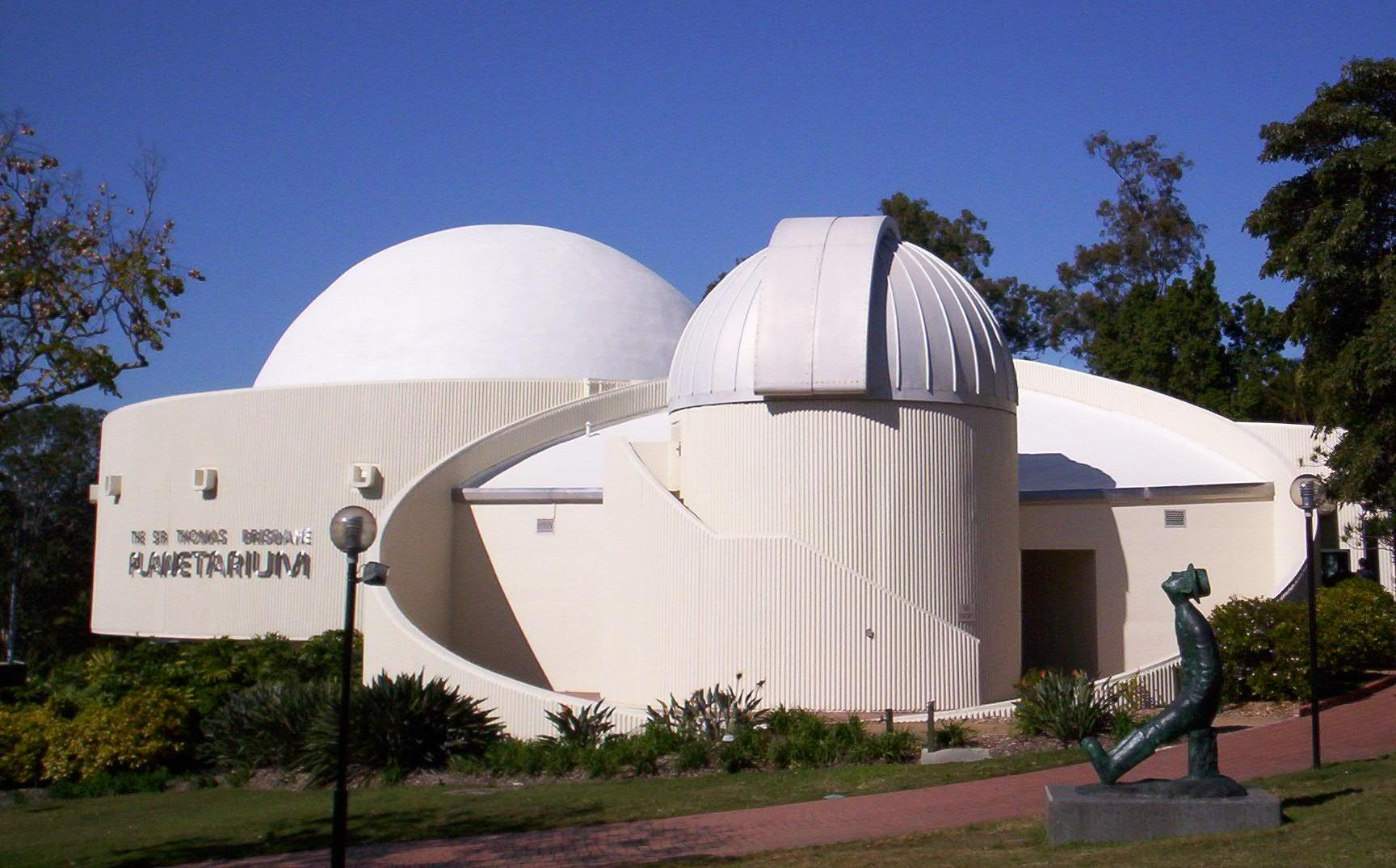
Sir Thomas Brisbane Planetarium and statue of Konstantin Tsiolkovsky

The Sir Thomas Brisbane Planetarium is located on the grounds of the Brisbane Botanic Gardens in the suburb of Mount Coot-tha, Brisbane, Queensland, Australia.

The Planetarium is named after Sir Thomas Brisbane, governor of the colony of New South Wales (1821–1825) and well known Scottish astronomer who established the first significant observatory at Parramatta, Australia, in 1822 for mapping the southern skies. The Planetarium is located about 5 kilometres (3.1 mi) from the Central Business District, and is administered by the Brisbane City Council.

== History ==
The Planetarium was officially opened on 24 May 1978.

The original Zeiss star projector was removed from the Cosmic Skydome during the upgrade in 2010 and was placed on display in the foyer in early 2012. A replacement optical star projector by Ohira Tech was installed in the Cosmic Skydome in early 2013, and decommissioned in 2021.

A major upgrade for the Planetarium was completed in June 2019 with a new digital projection system installed.

== Facilities ==
The Planetarium features the 12.5m diameter Cosmic Skydome (hemispherical planetarium theatre) with a maximum concentric seating capacity of 130. Extensive space exploration and astronomy displays in the Planetarium's Foyer and Gallery include the 1969 Apollo 11 Moon landing with a replica of Neil Armstrong's space suit and a 1/48-scale Saturn V rocket, meteorites, and numerous models of spacecraft, rockets, and astronomical instruments.

In 2018, the first permanent Australian exhibit on Aboriginal and Torres Strait Islander astronomy - SKYLORE: Aboriginal and Torres Strait Islander Astronomy - was installed in the Gallery; this exhibit, the content sourced and curated by Dr Duane Hamacher, an astronomer and academic working closely with Aboriginal and Torres Strait Islander communities, features some of Australia's leading Indigenous Elders sharing their star knowledge for the first time. An observatory contains a permanently mounted Zeiss 15 cm refractor and a Meade 25.4 cm "Go To" Schmidt-Cassegrain telescope.

The Planetarium runs more than 1,300 regular shows per year in the Cosmic Skydome for public and school groups, and occasional observing sessions in the observatory. During financial year 2017/2018, the Planetarium had more than 155,000 visitors with nearly 80,000 attending sessions in the Cosmic Skydome.

Access to the display areas is free. Admission charges apply for the Cosmic Skydome shows. The Planetarium is closed on Mondays (except during most Queensland school holiday periods) and Public Holidays.

Outside exhibits adjacent to the Planetarium include a statue of the Father of Cosmonautics, Konstantin Tsiolkovsky, a statue of Australian geologist and astrobiologist, Abigail Allwood, and a large sundial in the Sundial Courtyard.
