= Royal Queensland Art Society =

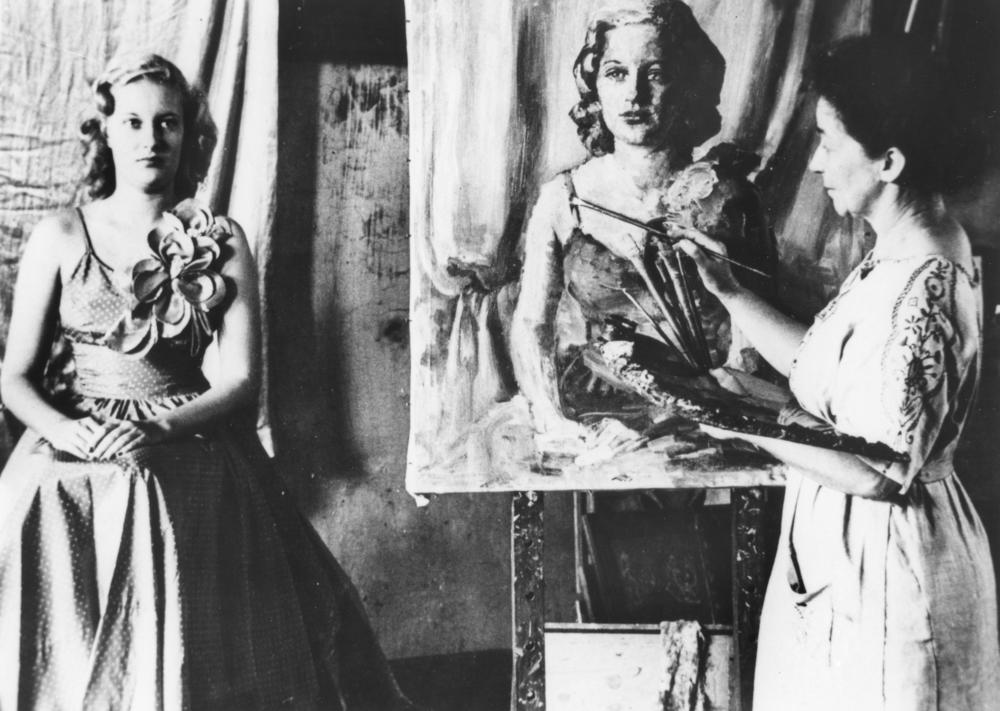
Portrait of Rhonda Kelly by artist Caroline Barker (vice president of the Royal Queensland Art Society), 1942

The Royal Queensland Art Society is an organisation in Queensland, Australia, for practising artists and those who appreciate art. It is the oldest art society in Queensland.

== History ==
A meeting was held in the Brisbane School of Arts on Thursday 4 August 1887 to propose the establishment of an art society in Queensland to be called the Queensland Art Society. It had nine initial members. The Queensland Premier Samuel Griffith was the inaugural president and Edgar Walker was the vice-president. Other members included artists Isaac Walter Jenner, Oscar Fristrom and Louis Wilhelm Carl Wirth.

The society held its first annual art exhibition in August 1888 at the Masonic Hall in Alice Street in conjunction with the Brisbane Exhibition. The exhibition consisted of about 200 works, mostly by local professional and amateur artists and supplemented by works of other artists loaned by the public. It was opened by Lady Musgrave, the wife of Queensland Governor Anthony Musgrave. The newspaper review was somewhat mixed, making positive remarks about some works, but also criticising the local artists of making too many copies of famous works and painting British landscapes rather than creating original works of local subject matter. Some letters to the newspapers were extremely critical.

The society received the Royal Warrant in 1926.

James Vincent Duhig, noted pathologist and nephew of archbishop James Duhig, served as the Society's president 1937–1946.

Over the decades many well-known artists have been long-term active members of the Society, such as: Godfrey Rivers, William Bustard, Daphne Mayo, Vida Lahey, William Grant and Gwendolyn Grant, Melville Haysom, Caroline Barker and Dr Irene Amos while others such as Margaret Olley and Betty Churcher were supported as young emerging artists.
