= Richard Godfrey Rivers =

English painter

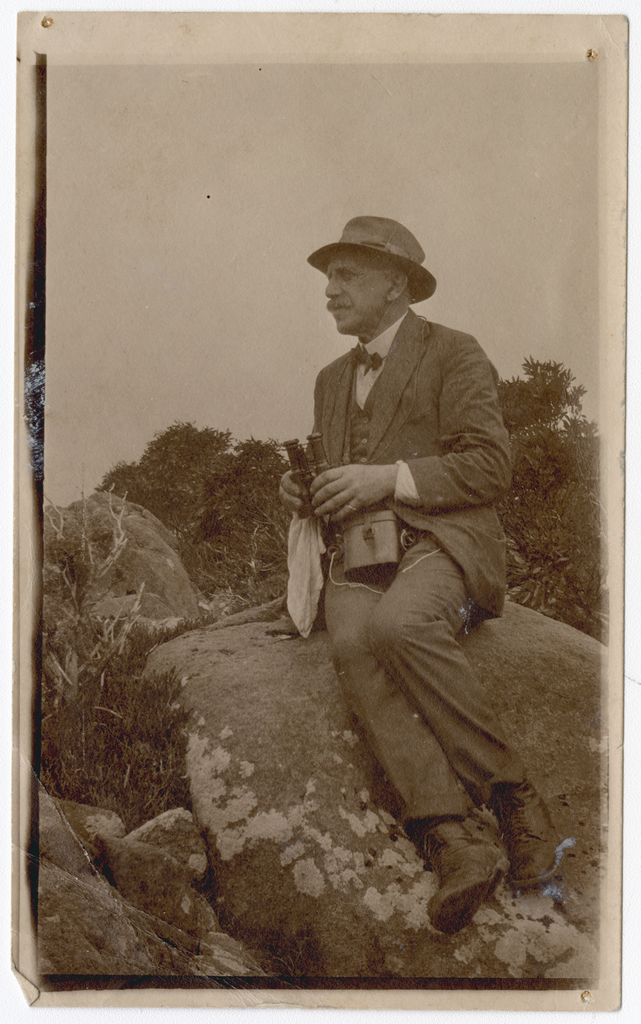
- Born: 28 November 1858; Plymouth, Devon, England
- Died: 4 February 1925 (aged 66); England
- Resting place: Toowong Cemetery, Brisbane
- Other name: R. Godfrey Rivers
- Education: Slade School of Fine Art, University College London
- Known for: Painter, art gallery curator, art teacher

Richard Godfrey Rivers (1858 – 4 February 1925), generally known as R. Godfrey Rivers, was an English artist, active in Australia and president of the Queensland Art Society from 1892–1901 and 1904–08.

== Early life ==
Richard Godfrey Rivers was born in 1858 in Plymouth, England, the son of Richard Rivers and Bertha (née Harris). His older brother was Arthur Richard Rivers, an Anglican priest in Australia.

Rivers studied at the Slade School of Art (1877–83) in London under Professor Alphonse Legros. He won a landscape painting prize there in 1883 and exhibited at the Royal Academy in 1884.

== Artistic career ==
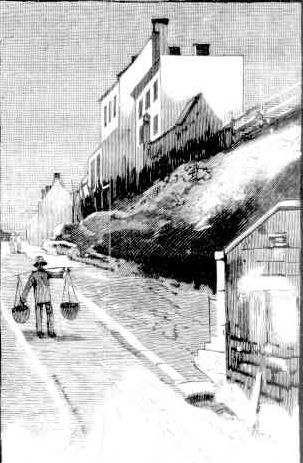
Street in Old Sydney', by Richard Godfrey Rivers, 1889

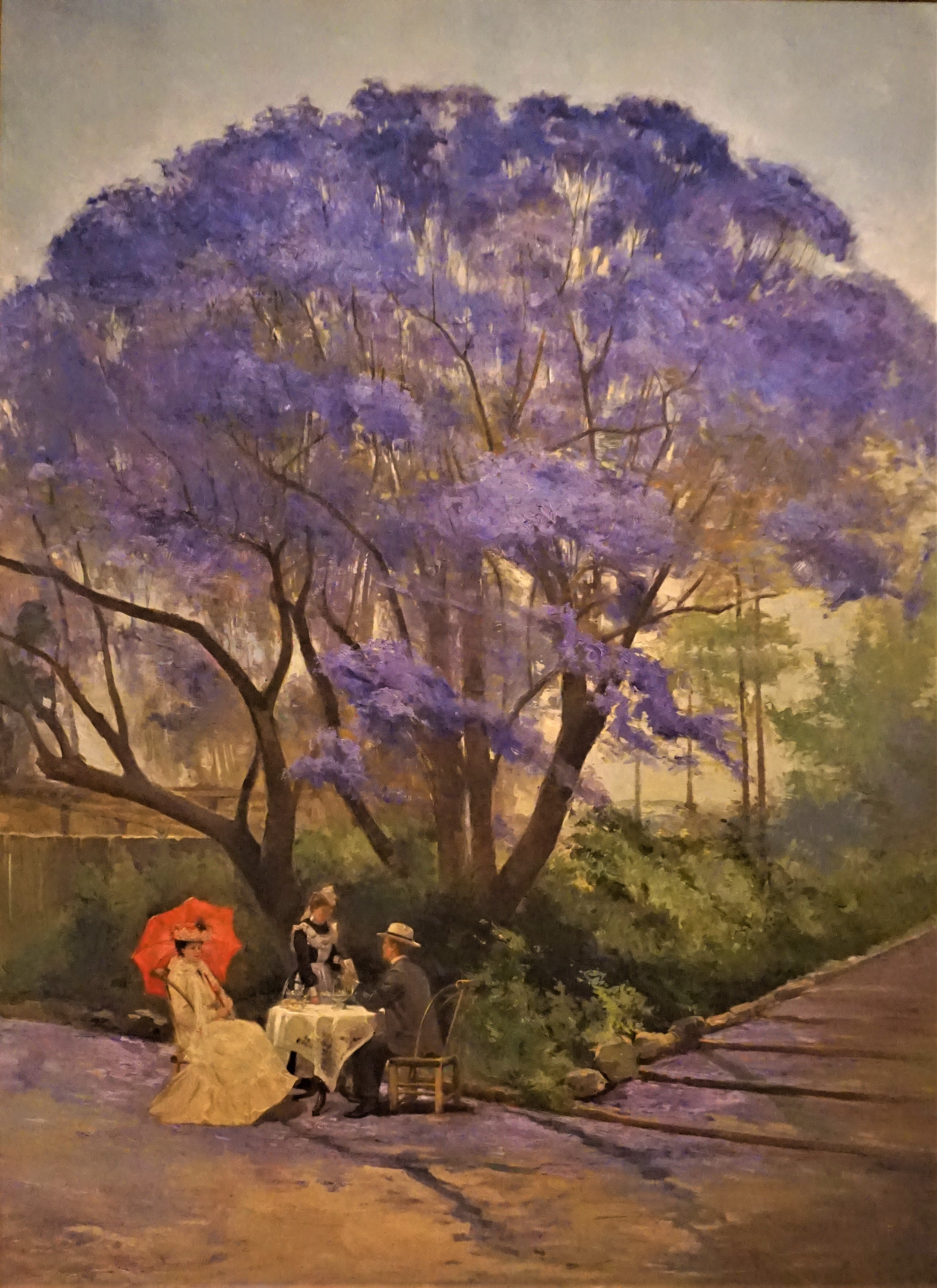
Under The Jacaranda (1903) - R. Godfrey Rivers

Rivers emigrated to Australia in 1889 and taught at Katoomba College (along with Phil May). Rivers was second art master at Brisbane Central Technical College from 1890 to 1915; and was president of the Queensland Art Society from 1892–1901 and 1904–08. He was also honorary curator of the Queensland National Art Gallery from 1895 to 1914.

On 25 Sept 1901, Richard Godfrey Rivers married Selina Jane (née Bell) at St John's Cathedral, Brisbane, the ceremony being conducted by his brother Arthur. The couple had a son (also named Richard Godfrey) in 1907 but he died in 1912 and was buried in Toowong Cemetery.

In 1903, Rivers painted a picture Under the Jacaranda, which has been described as "quintessentially Brisbane". The painting of Rivers and his wife Selina taking tea beside the Brisbane Central Technical College under the shade of Australia's first Jacaranda tree planted in the Brisbane Botanic Gardens by the garden's first curator Walter Hill. The woman in the painting is often described as his future wife Miss Selina Bell, despite the couple marrying in 1901, although it is possible that an earlier version of the work preceded their marriage. The painting is part of the collection of the Queensland Art Gallery.

Rivers' portraits, including one of Sir Samuel Griffith, are displayed at the Supreme Court of Queensland. He also taught at the Brisbane High School for Girls and at Brisbane Girls Grammar School. He moved to Hobart, Tasmania in 1915 and tried to raise interest in the Hobart gallery.

== Later life ==
Rivers died of typhoid fever in London, England on 4 February 1925. He was cremated in London and his ashes buried in his son's grave in Toowong Cemetery, Brisbane. A memorial service was held for him in St John's Cathedral in Brisbane. His wife Selina died in 1948 in Hobart, Tasmania. She was cremated there and her ashes were also buried in their son's grave in Toowong Cemetery.

== Legacy ==
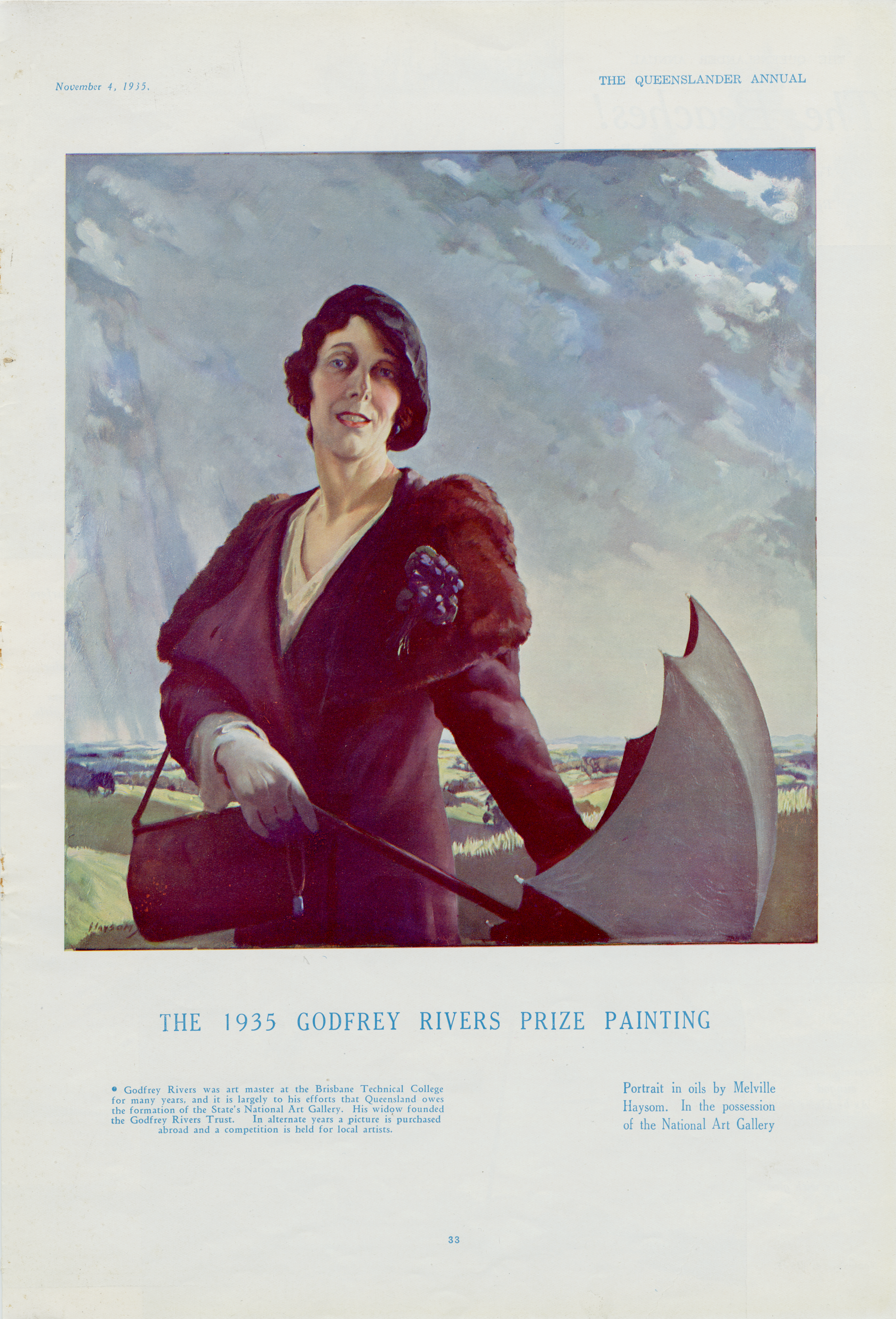
Melville Haysom wins the Godfrey Rivers Trust art prize, 1935

His wife Selina founded the Godfrey Rivers Trust. On alternating years, the trust would purchase an overseas art work or provide a prize for local artists.
