= Brisbane Botanic Gardens, Mount Coot-tha =

Botanical garden in Queensland, Australia

Brisbane Botanic Gardens
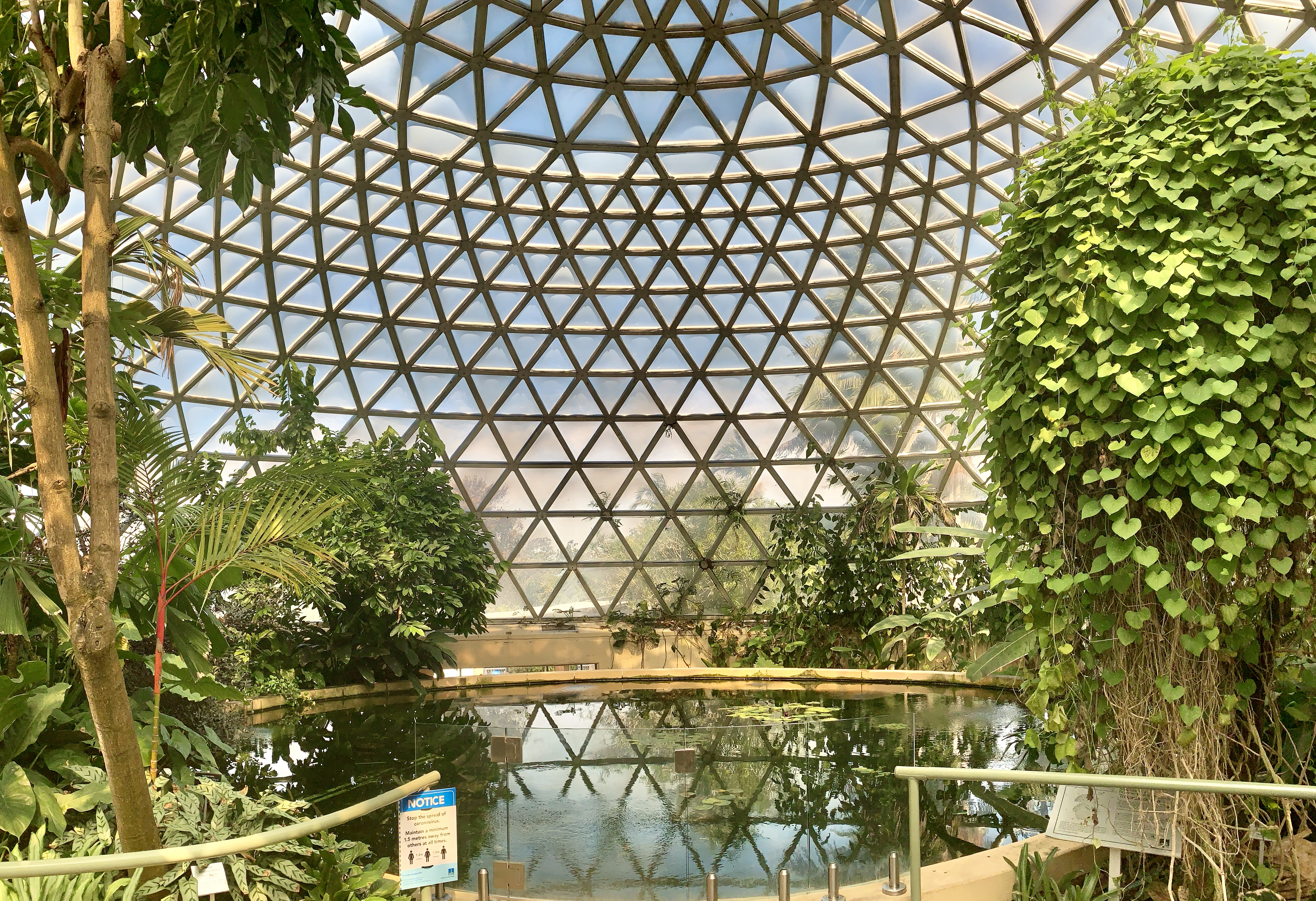
- Tropical Display Dome of the Brisbane Botanic Gardens
- Interactive map of Brisbane Botanic Gardens
- Type: Botanical
- Location: Mount Coot-tha, Brisbane, Queensland, Australia
- Area: 52 hectares (130 acres)
- Opened: 1970
- Owner: Brisbane City Council
- Collections: 27.4765°S 152.9761°E

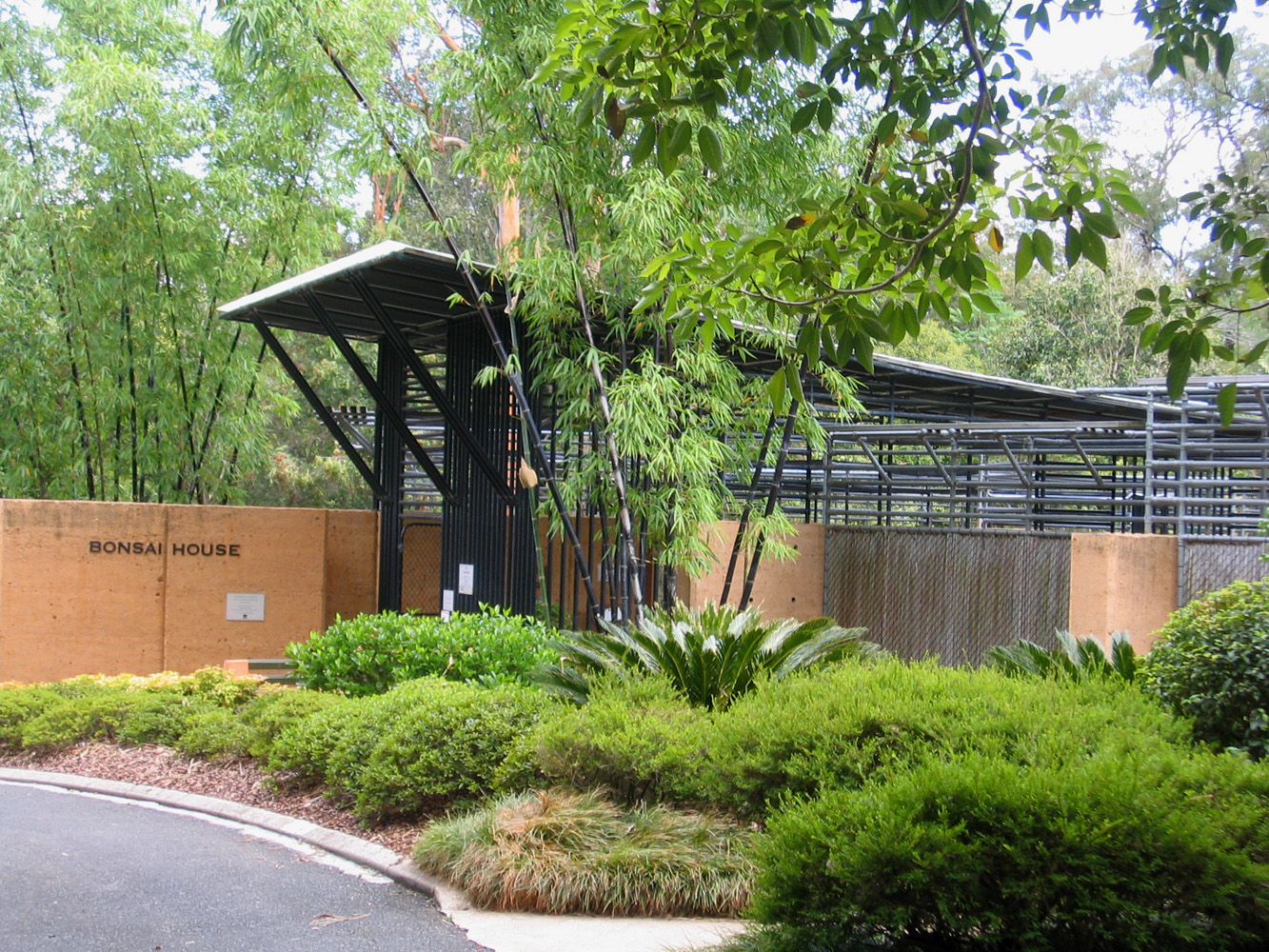
Bonsai House

The Brisbane Botanic Gardens (formerly the Mount Coot-tha Botanic Gardens and informally the Toowong Botanic Gardens) are located 7 kilometres (4.3 mi) from the Brisbane CBD at the foot of Brisbane's tallest mountain, Mount Coot-tha in the suburb of Mount Coot-tha, Queensland, Australia. The gardens receive around 1.4 million visitors a year. Entry to the gardens is free.

== History ==
The gardens, which were originally called the Mount Coot-tha Botanic Gardens and which cover 52 hectares (130 acres), were established by the Brisbane City Council in 1970, and officially opened in 1976. The gardens are the second botanical gardens established in Brisbane. The original gardens, now known as the City Botanic Gardens are located in the Brisbane CBD at Gardens Point. The new gardens were developed by the City Council because the original city site could not be expanded and was flood prone.

The Mount Coot-tha Library at the gardens opened in 1975.

In 2023, approval was granted for the introduction of a year-round light show in the gardens.

== Features ==
Features of the Brisbane Botanic Gardens include:

- Tropical Display Dome — opened in December 1977, 28 m (92 ft) in diameter and 9 m 9 m (30 ft) high
- Japanese Garden
- Bonsai House
- Fern House
- Arid Zone and Cactus House
- Exotic Rainforest
- Australian Rainforest
- Fragrant Plant and Herb Garden
- Temperate Garden
- Lagoon and Bamboo Grove
- Australian Plant communities
- National Australia Remembers Freedom Wall
- Children's Art Trail
- Public Artworks by Anna Varendoff, Jamie North, and John Underwood

The gardens are open every day of the year between 8am to 6pm from September to March and 8am to 5pm April to August. Entry to the gardens is free. Dogs are not permitted in the gardens.

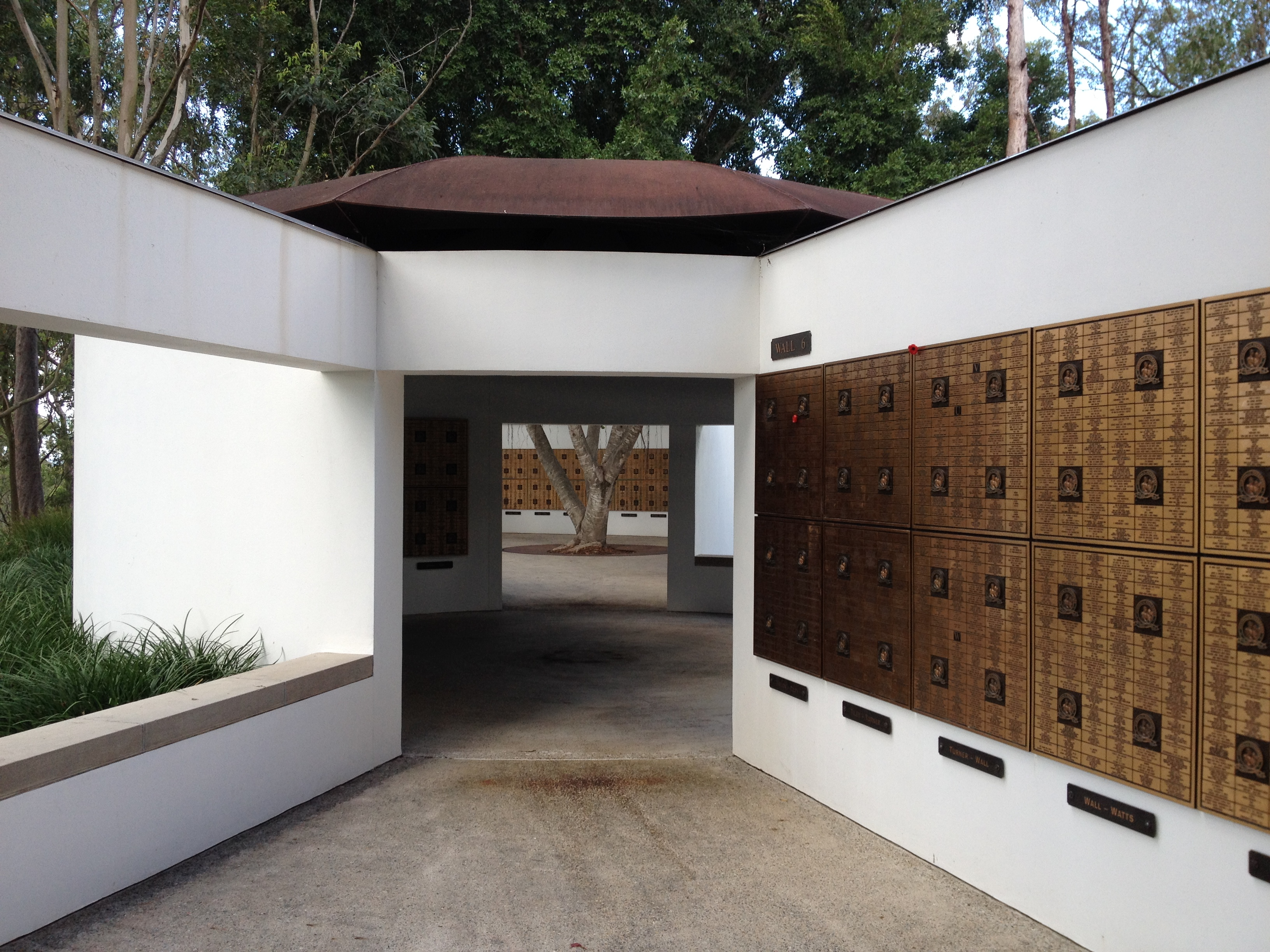
National Freedom Wall

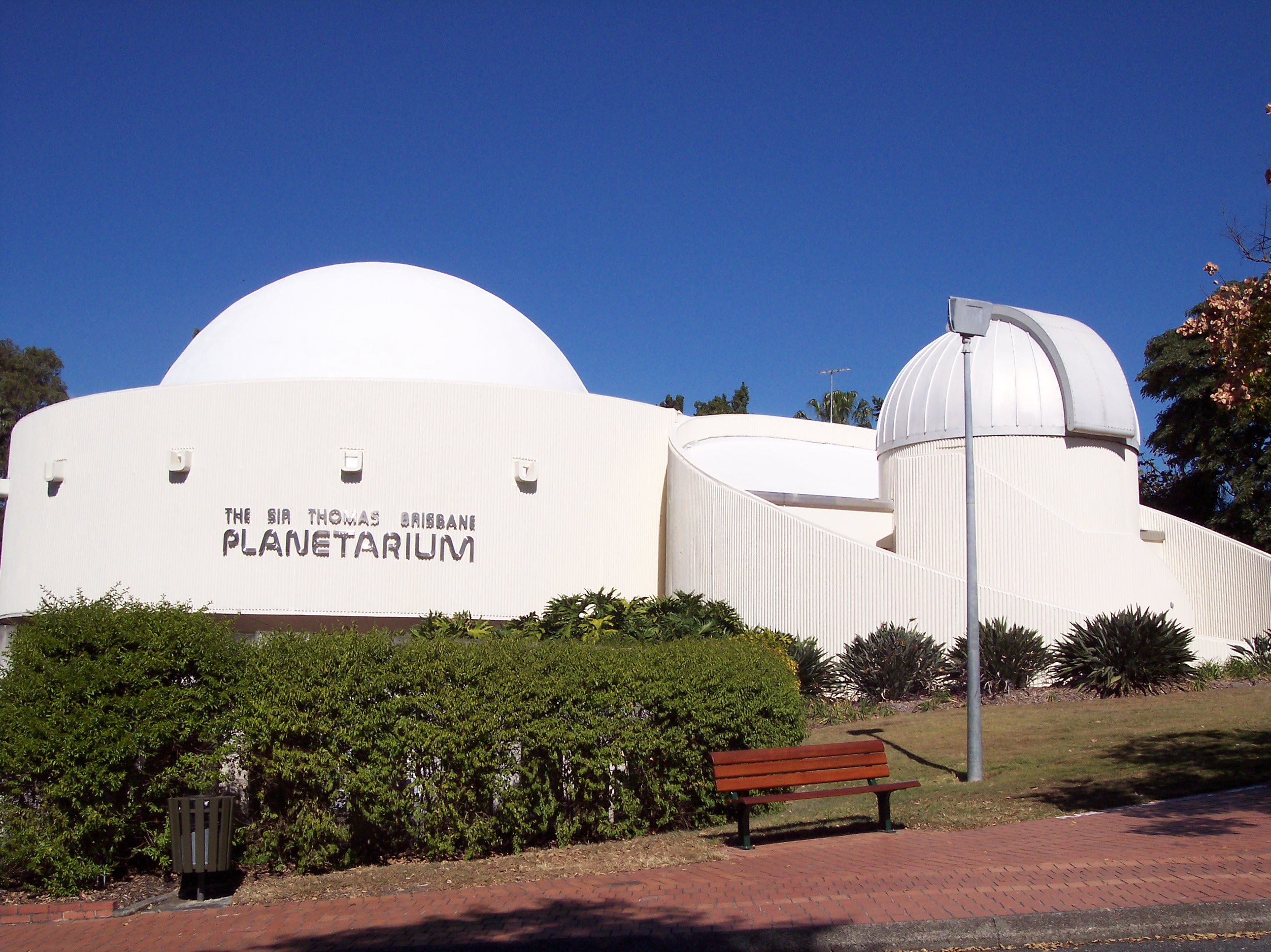
Sir Thomas Brisbane Planetarium

== Sir Thomas Brisbane Planetarium ==
Located adjacent to the entrance of the gardens is the Sir Thomas Brisbane Planetarium, which incorporates the Cosmic Skydome. Sir Thomas Brisbane, in addition to being the Governor of New South Wales after whom the city of Brisbane was named, was also a renowned astronomer who catalogued the southern skies of Australia during his term.

== Mount Coot-tha Library ==
Also located at the gardens is the Mount Coot-tha Library operated by Brisbane City Council. Unlike most public libraries in Brisbane which have general collections, this library holds a specialist collection about botany and astronomy and related topics, reflecting its location within the botanic garden and the Brisbane Planetarium also on the site.

== National Australia Remembers Freedom Wall ==
Australia celebrated the 50th anniversary of victory in the Pacific on 15 August 1995. The National Australia Remembers Freedom Wall in Brisbane Botanic Gardens Mt Coot-tha is a space meant for quiet contemplation and reflection on the Sacrifice of the Generation who fought for the "Freedom" we enjoy today. The wall is not a war memorial but a symbol to celebrate 50 years of freedom. There are 16,000 tribute plaques on the walls to remember loved ones or simply an expression of thanks. Foundation stone laid on 11 November 1995 and unveiled on 11 November 1996.

== Japanese Garden ==
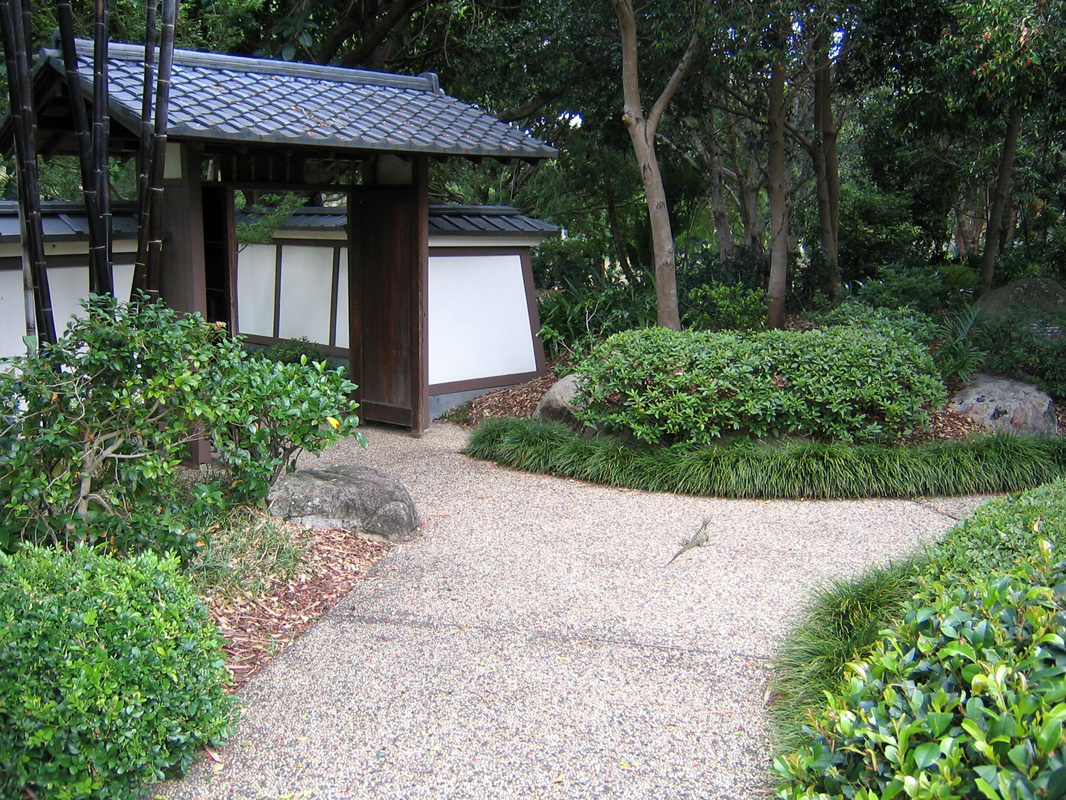
Entrance to the Japanese Garden

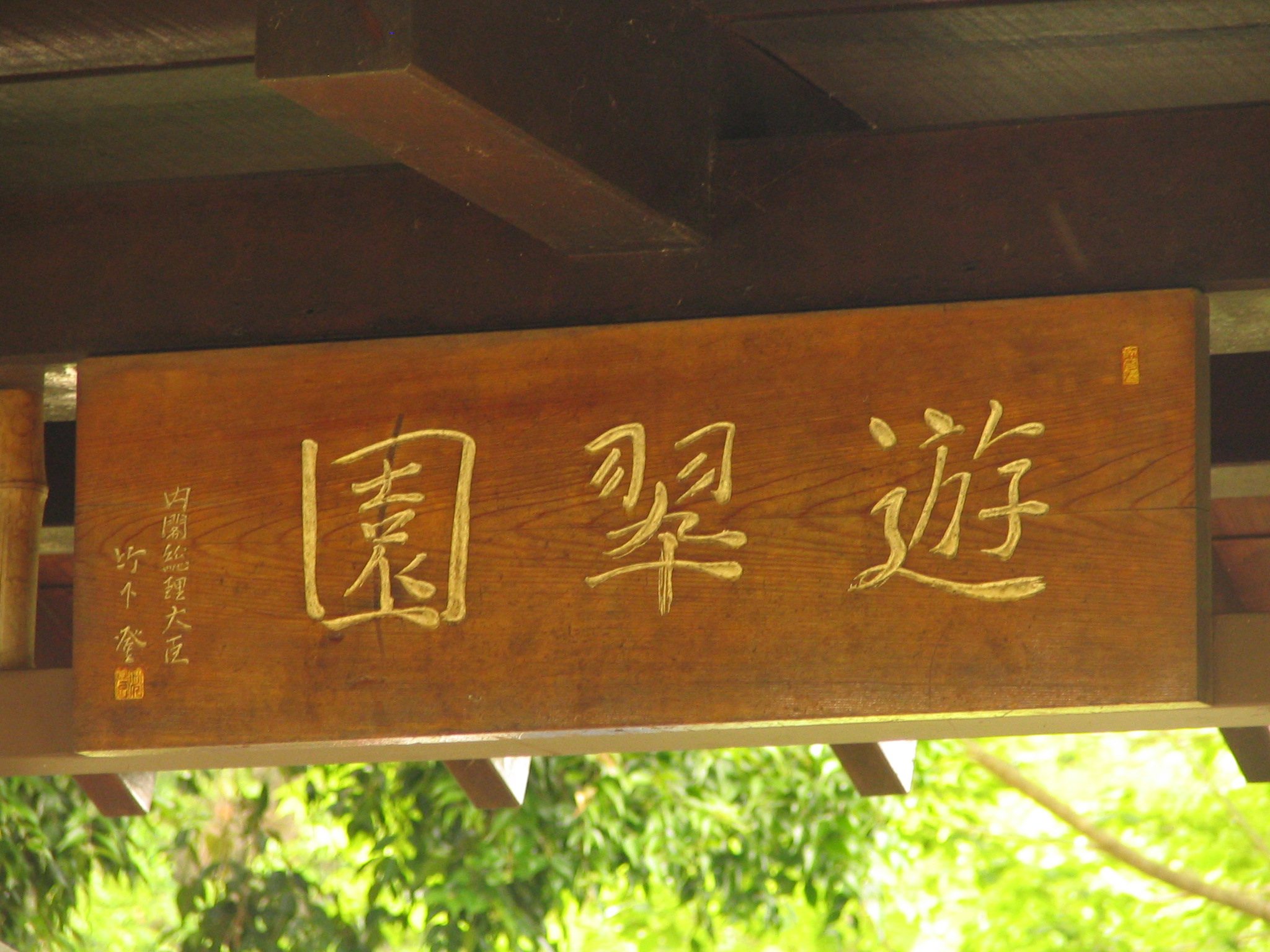
The Garden's dedication tablet, with calligraphy by Japanese Prime Minister Noboru Takeshita

Designed by one of Japan's leading traditional Japanese garden proponents the late Kenzo Ogata (his last work), the garden is faithful to Japanese Garden design concepts, and uses Australian trees, native shrubs and flowers.

The Japan Pond and Garden was re-located from the Japanese Government Pavilion at Brisbane's World Expo 88, and was opened after the conclusion of the Expo on 6 February 1989 through the work of the Brisbane Lord Mayor Sallyanne Atkinson and Nichahiro Hanamura, the chair of the Japan Association for the Expo. A commemorative dedication plaque from Brisbane City Council and the Japan Association for the 1988 Leisure Exposition and a welcome gate with calligraphy on a dedication tablet above the gate by then Prime Minister of Japan Noboru Takeshita greets visitors to the Garden at the entrance to the Garden. The Japanese calligraphy is engraved in gold, dedicating the name of the garden, "yu-tsui-en".

The theme of the garden, tsuki-yama-chisen or 'mountain-pond-stream', is reflected in the water feature of the garden. Another feature which is not to be forgotten is just as special as the previous; the stone 'tsukabai' or water bowl. It is more than 100 years old and is used to "provide running water needed in the purification ritual that occurs before the tea ceremony". The most captivating feature of the garden is the stones which create the mountain. These stones of the waterfall suggest "endurance and the eternal passing of time".

In 2005 a clump of bamboo flowered just outside the gates to the Japanese Garden. Bamboo flowering is very rare and many bamboo enthusiasts go their whole lives without ever witnessing such an event. As is often the case after bamboo flowers, this plant died and was replaced with another specimen.

An annual Japan Cultural Festival is held at the Garden in August, featuring Japanese tea ceremony, Japanese calligraphy and ikebana flower displays.

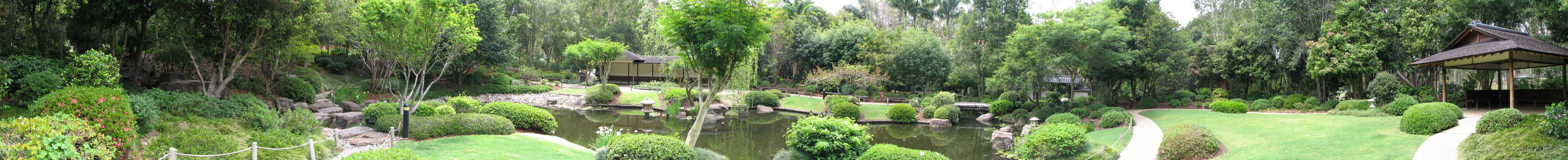
Panorama view of the Japan Pond & Garden, Mount Coot-tha Botanic Gardens, Brisbane

== See also ==
- Parks and gardens of Brisbane
- Greater Des Moines Botanical Garden, Des Moines, United States
- Bloedel Floral Conservatory, Vancouver, Canada
