= Nepalese Peace Pagoda =

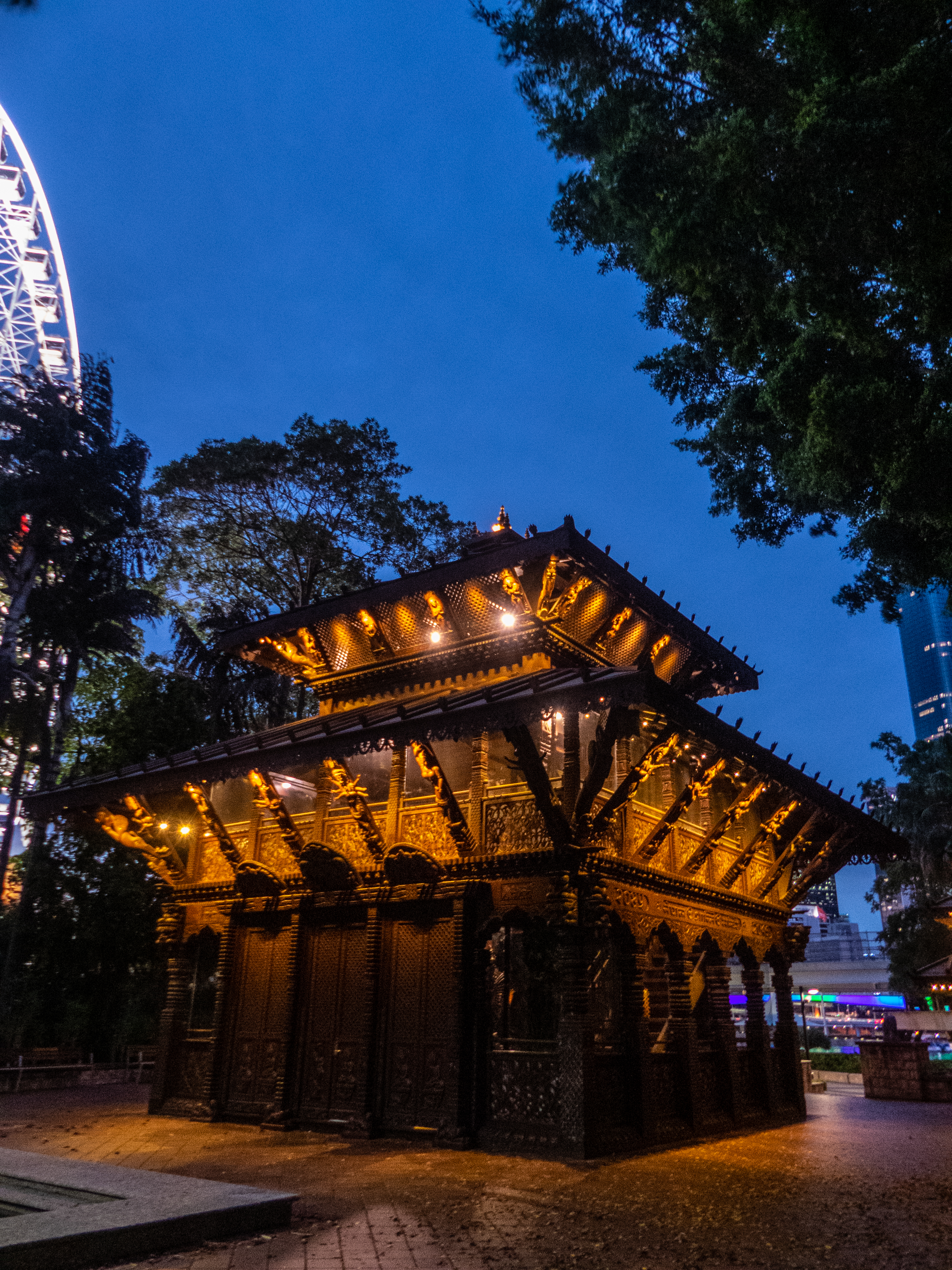
- Pagoda at night
- Interactive map of the Nepalese Peace Pagoda area

General information
- Status: Completed
- Type: Hindu and Buddhist temple
- Architectural style: Nepalese pagoda
- Location: South Bank Parklands, Brisbane, Australia
- Coordinates: 27.4754259°S 153.0213664°E
- Elevation: 10 m (33 ft)
- Opened: 1988

Design and construction
- Architect: Jochen Reier

Website
- Visit South Bank site

The Nepal Peace Pagoda in Brisbane, Queensland, Australia, is located at the transformed Brisbane World Expo 88 site, South Bank Parklands. It is one of the most significant heritage items in Brisbane from the hosting of the Expo. It is the only international exhibit remaining on the site.

== Origins ==
In 1986, the United Nations International Year of Peace, the Kingdom of Nepal agreed to participate in World Expo '88, and the Association to Preserve Asian Culture was commissioned to create, operate for the Expo, and find a new home for the Pagoda at the Expo's conclusion.

== Construction ==
The Peace Pagoda was built by a German architect on behalf of the Kingdom of Nepal. Immediately, 80 metric tons (79 long tons; 88 short tons) of indigenous Nepalese timber were sourced from the Terai jungle forest of Nepal, carted across to the capital Kathmandu where 160 Nepalese families worked for two years at crafting its diverse elements. These were then shipped to Australia in two 40-foot (12 m) containers and one 20-foot (6.1 m) container, where they were assembled at the Expo site by a handful of Australian workers under Nepalese supervision and architect Jochen Reier. The final assembly for Expo 88 took six months.

== During the Expo ==
Three-levelled, with a beautiful tea house on the second level, and one of the only hand-crafted pavilions, the Pagoda became one of the most visited and photographed pavilions at the Expo. Towards the end of the Expo, a group of persons called Friends of the Pagoda established a petition to keep the Pagoda in Brisbane after the conclusion of the Expo, with some 70,000 signatories, which the architect and chairman of APAC, Jochen Reier had collected during Expo.

Sir Edmund Hillary, the first person to ascend Mount Everest, was VIP guest to the Pagoda during the Expo on 8 August 1988.

== Artistic and religious heritage ==
The Pagoda is one of three Nepal Peace Pagodas built by the German architect Jochen Reier, who had the dream, to bring the Nepalese Peace Pagodas to all five Continents. The other two are located in Munich and Osaka, and are modeled after the Pashupatinath Temple in Kathmandu, with significant Hindu and Buddhist iconography representing the different Avatars of Shiva, Buddhas in different states of meditation, or madras, the eight auspicious symbols of Buddhism, a sacred statue of Avalokiteshvara, the Buddhist deity of compassion, as well as a Peace Bell, two smaller side Pavilions, a Buddhist stupa, and a Peace Post, with the calling to World Peace in four languages Japanese, French, Spanish and English. Sanskrit prayer chants also feature inscribed on the roof eaves of the two side Pavilions, as well as the inscription for om above the central door.

Whilst not used as a traditional Buddhist or Hindu center, it is occasionally used for weddings, private functions, book launches and company events, and many visitors can be seen using the Pagoda's internal first level Church pews for personal meditation. South Bank Corporation manages the Pagoda on behalf of the Roma Street Parkland and the City of Brisbane.

== After the Expo ==
After the Expo, it was work of Friends of the Pagoda, with Brisbane City Council Councilor David Hinchliffe as head, to liaise between government and private donations to keep the Pagoda in Brisbane, and the campaign was a success. Various ideas were put forward as to where to host the Pagoda, including the Queensland Art Gallery, and City Botanic Gardens, with South Bank Parklands the final successful resting place for the Pagoda, at its new riverfront location, where it became part of the parklands opening in June 1992.

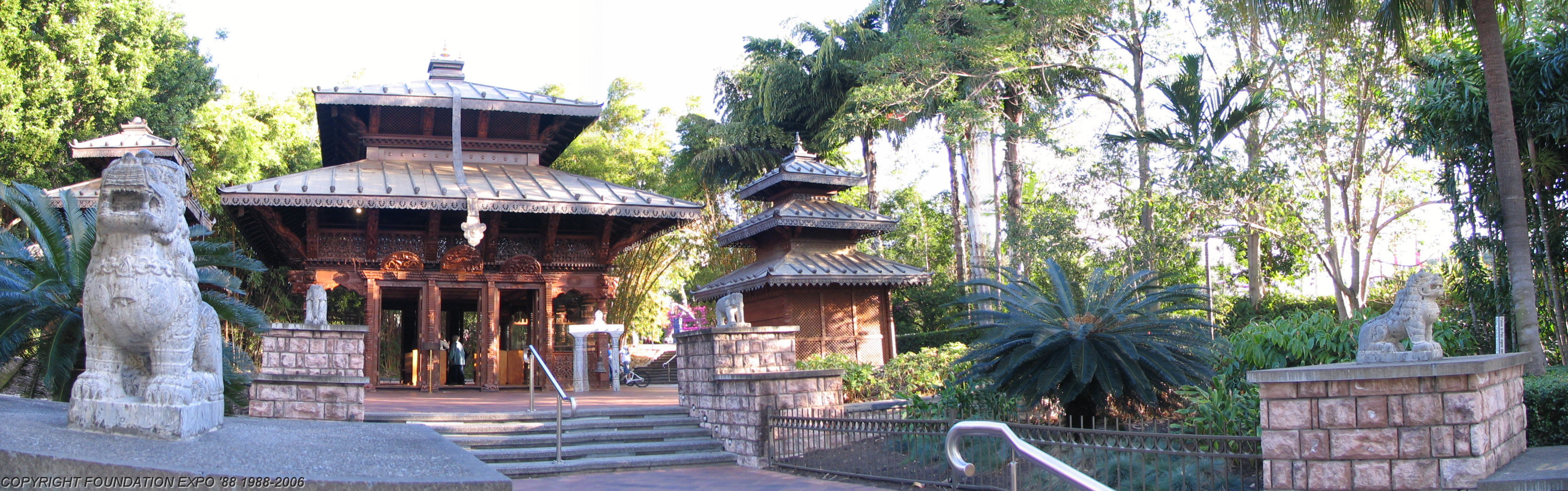
The Brisbane Nepal Peace Pagoda at South Bank Parklands.

== 2008 20th Anniversary of World Expo '88 ==
As part of the 20th Anniversary celebrations of World Expo '88, Foundation Expo '88 and the newly re-launched The Friends of the Pagoda Association hosted a retrospective World Expo '88 photograph exhibition and memorabilia display at the Pagoda, of which the memorabilia display still is shown to this day. The Queensland Branch of the Nepal Australia Friendship Association (NAFA) also held Nepal-themed poster, pamphlet and craftwork displays at the Pagoda on the World Expo '88 20th Anniversary Community Day, Saturday 10 May 2008.

== Gallery ==
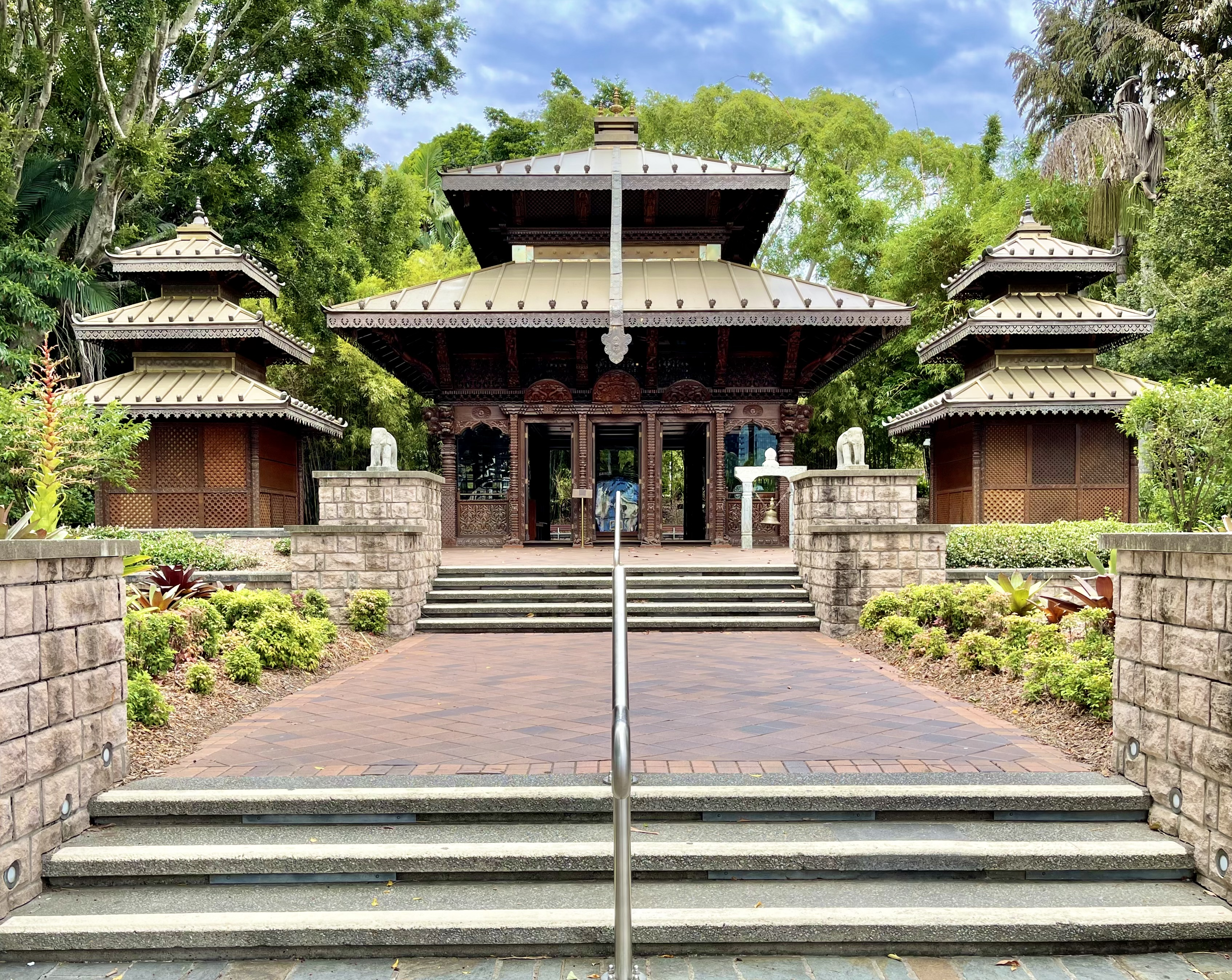
Front view of the pagoda

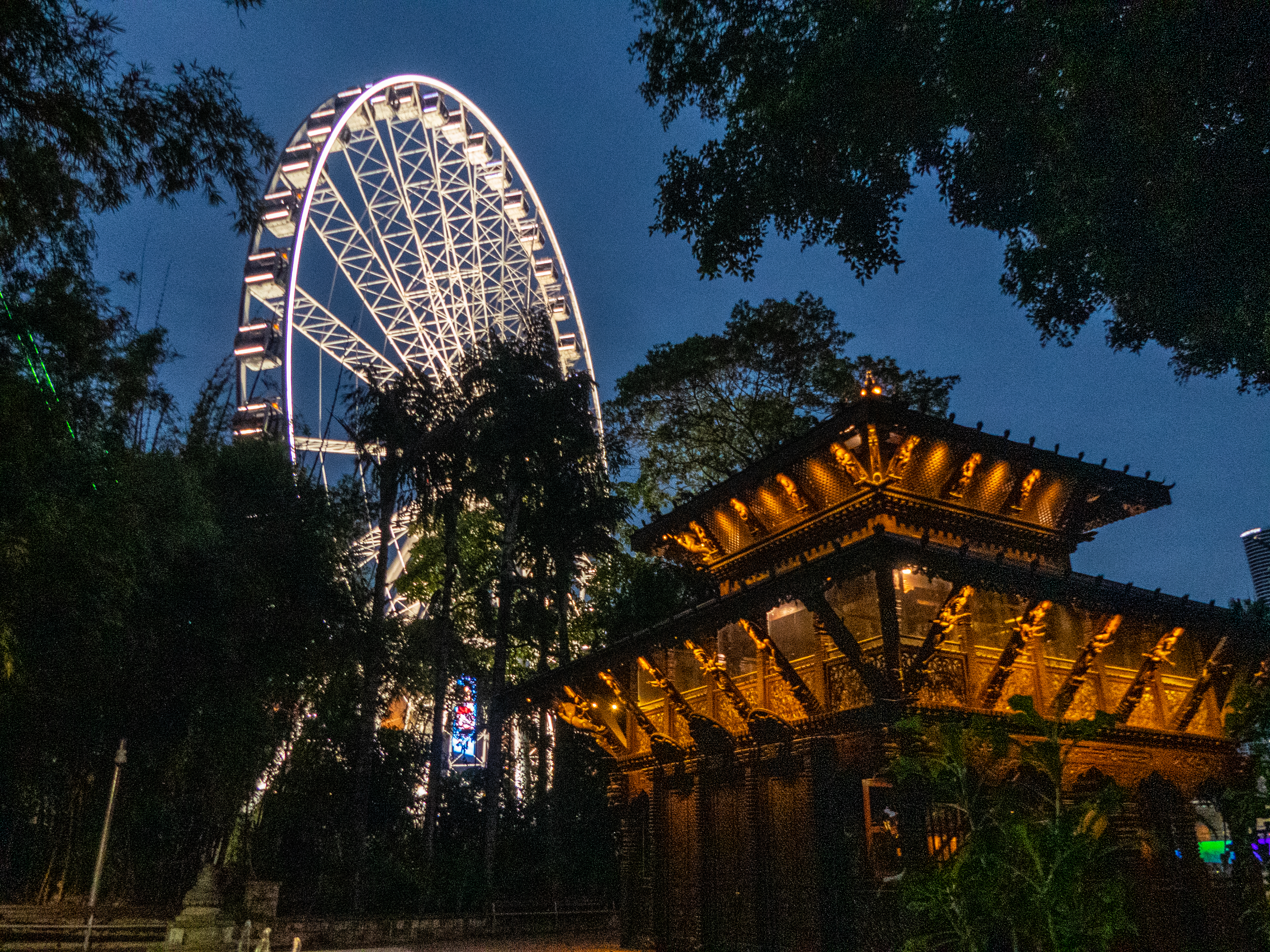
Nepalese Peace Pagoda with Wheel of Brisbane in background

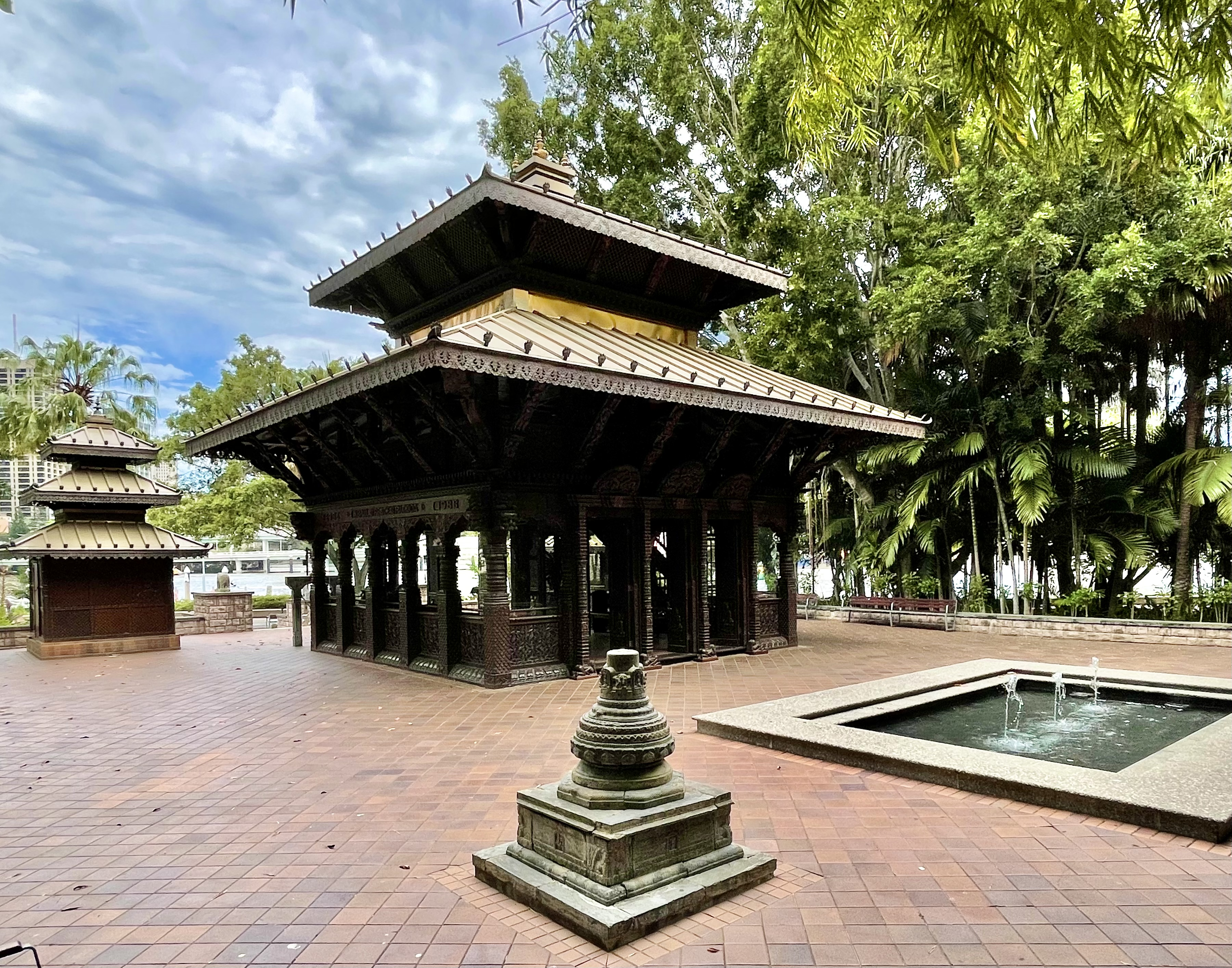
Rear view of the pagoda.

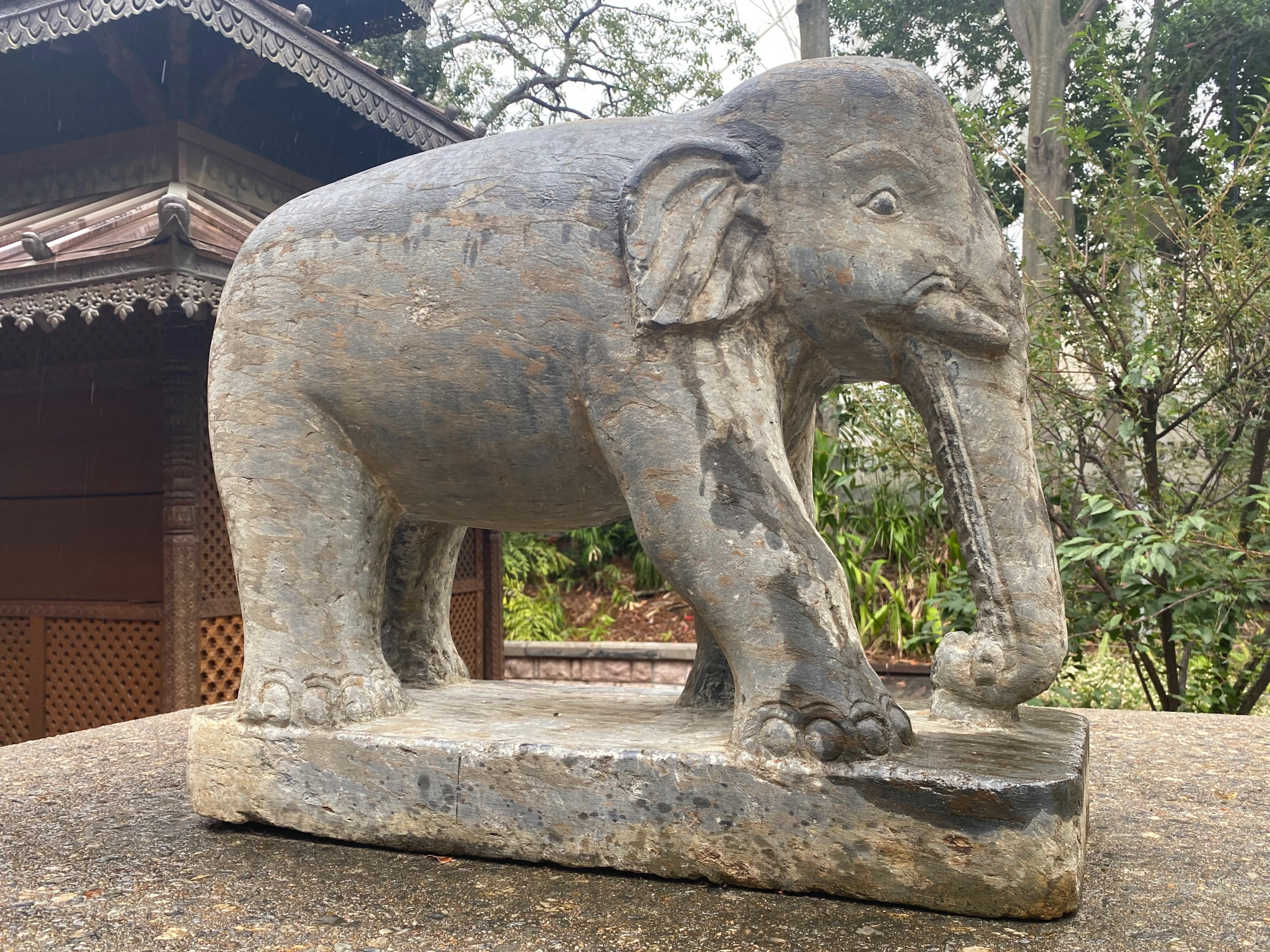
Stone elephant at the entrance of the pagoda

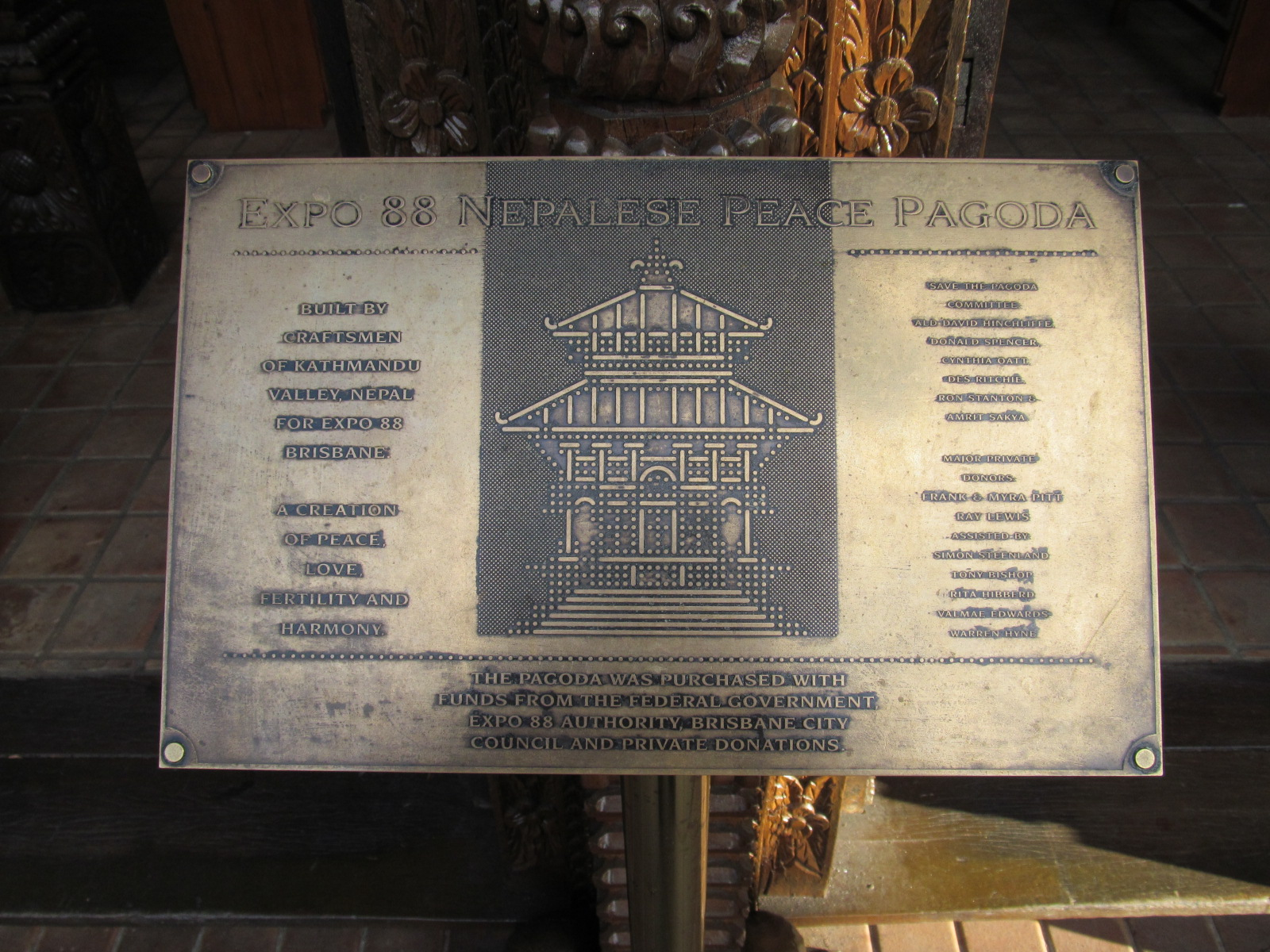
A bronze plaque

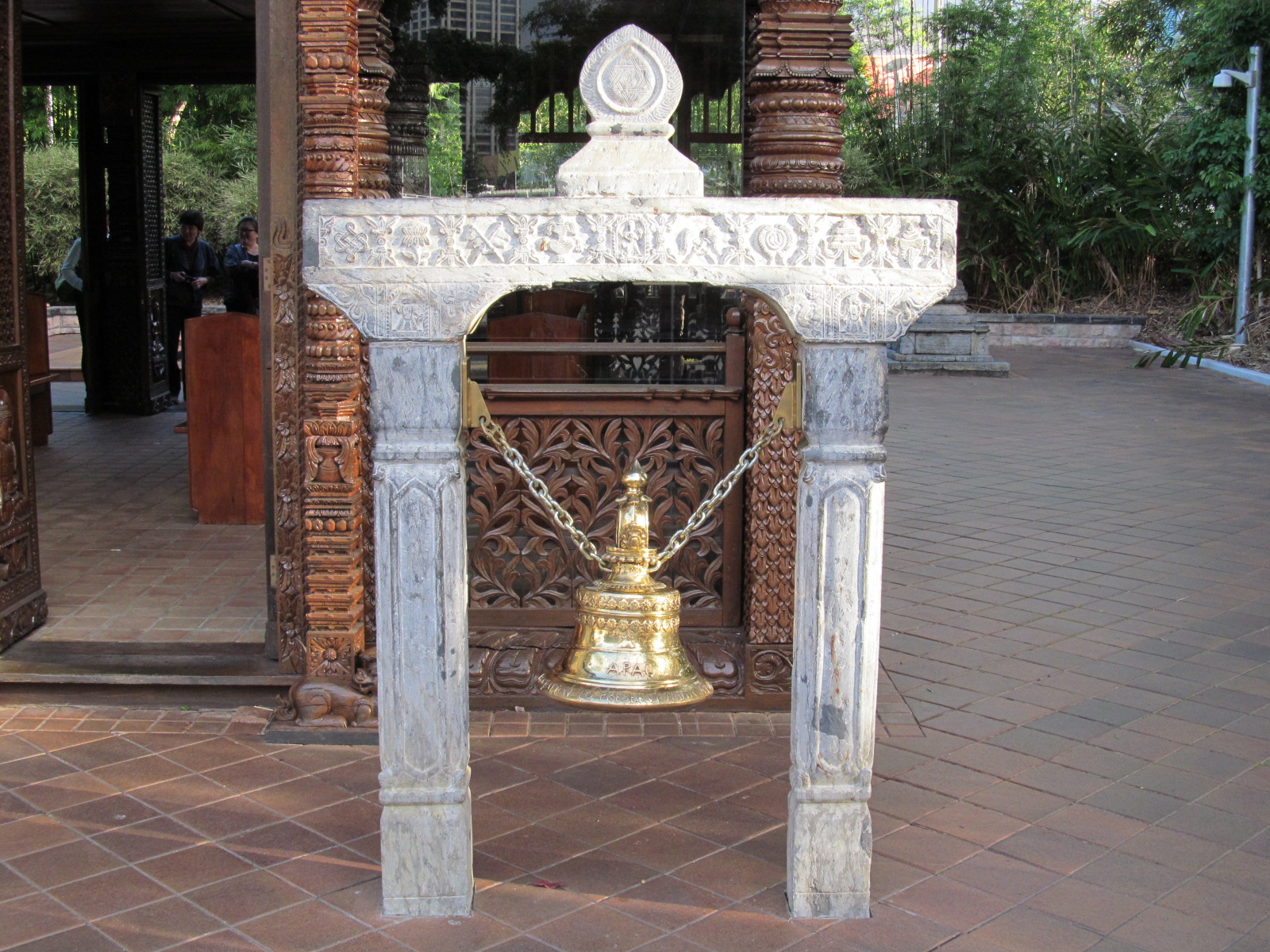
A bronze bell outside the main pagoda

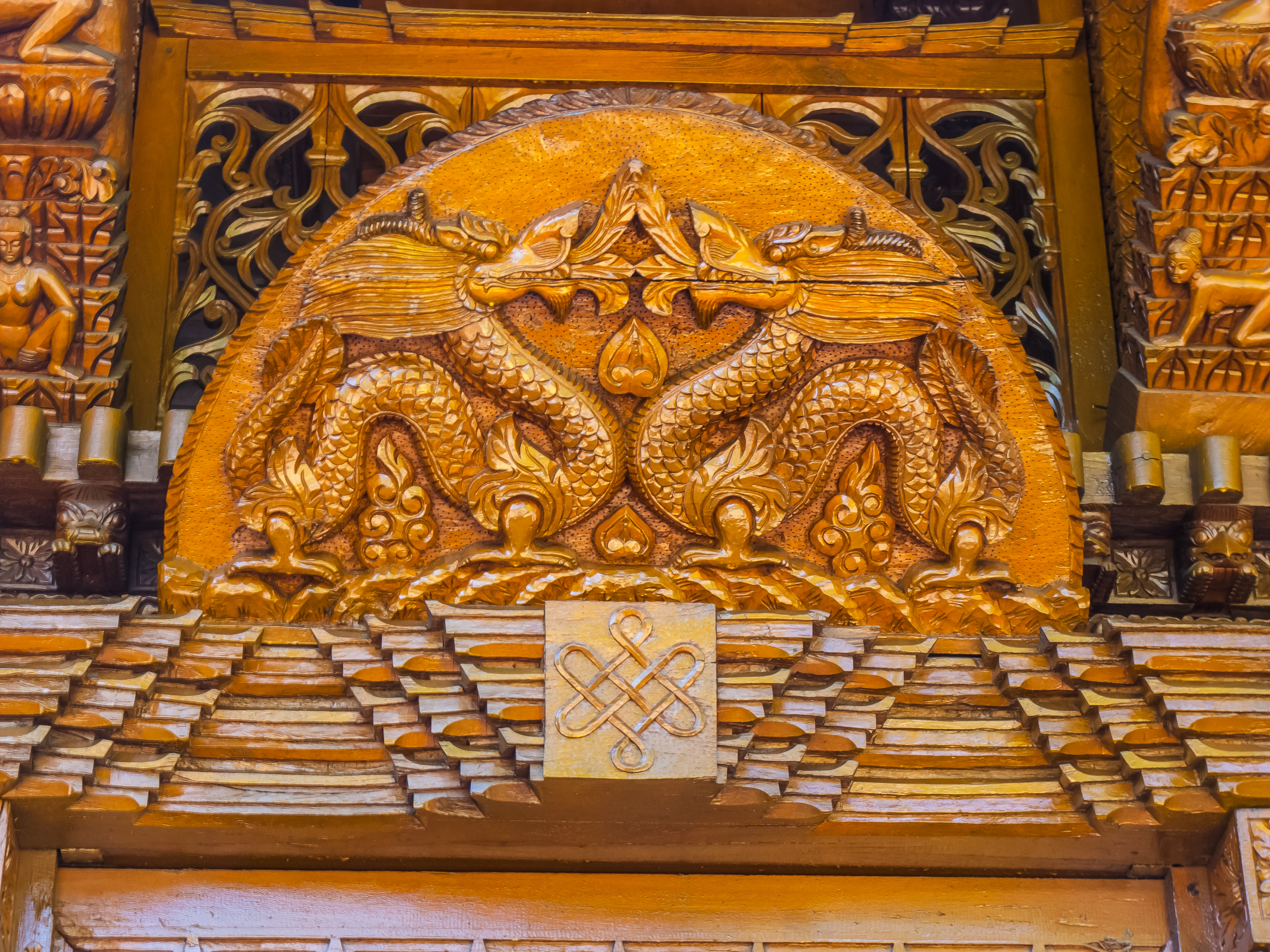
Ornate carvings

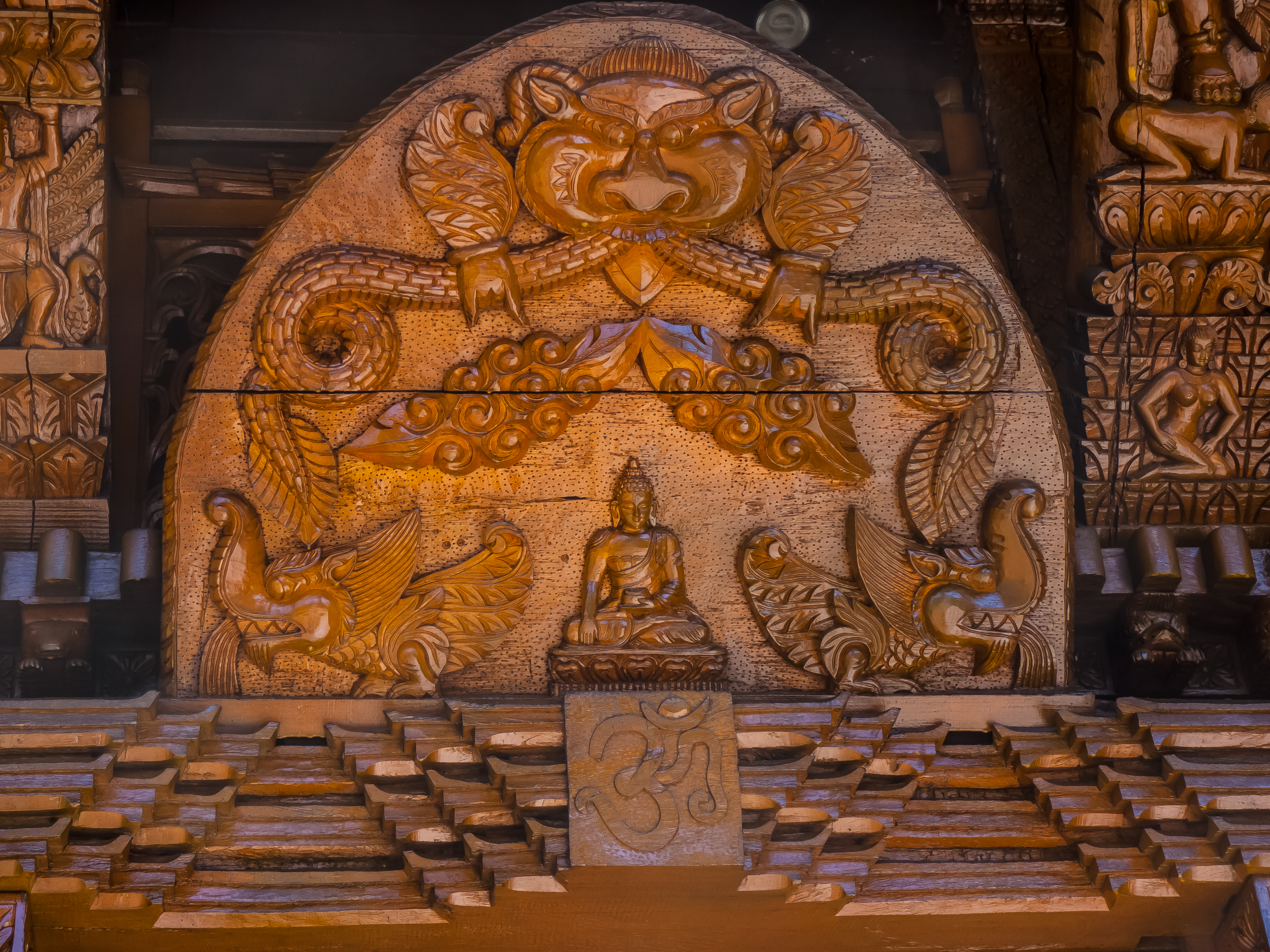
Ornate carvings

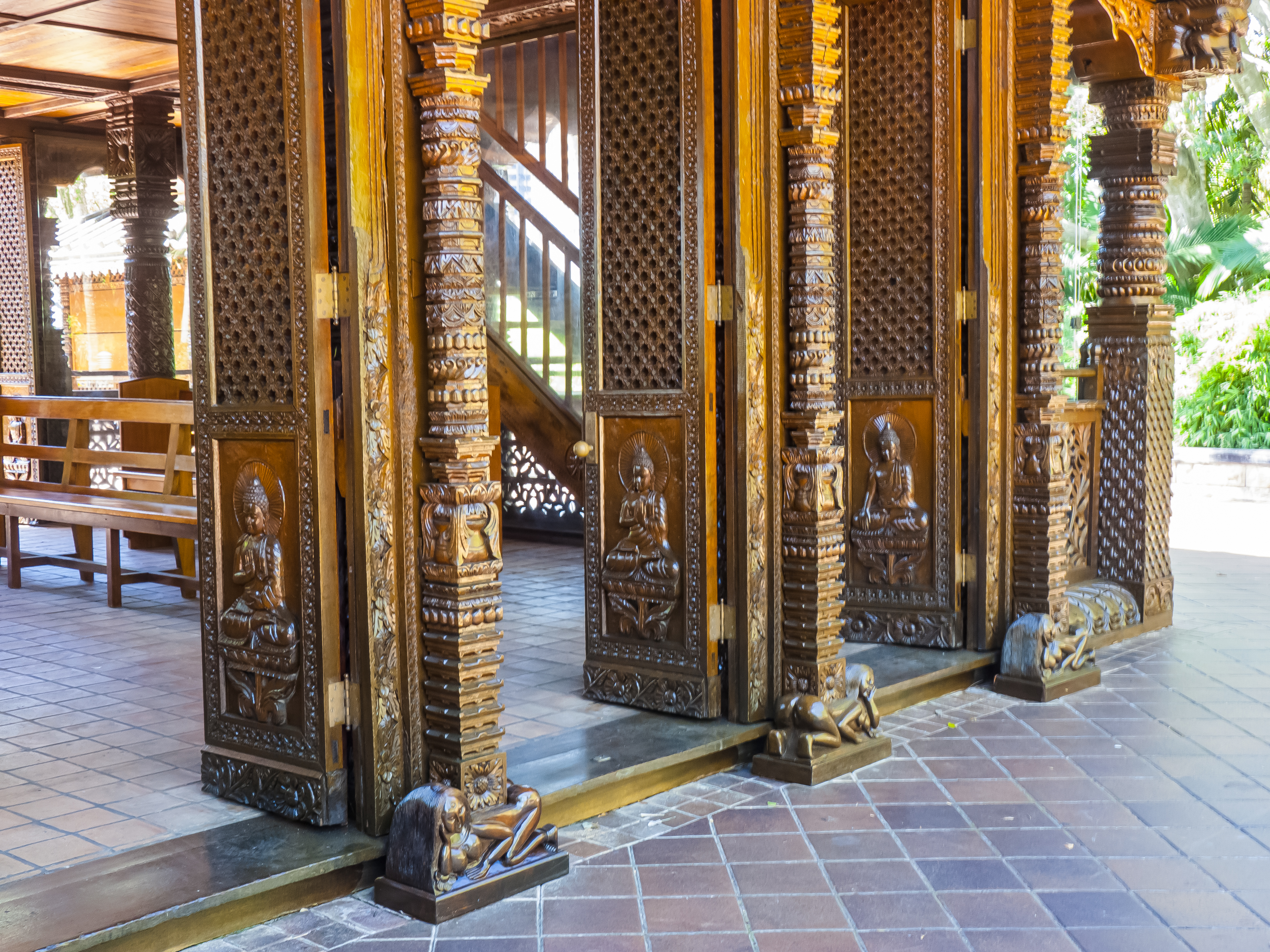
Carved Buddha on doors

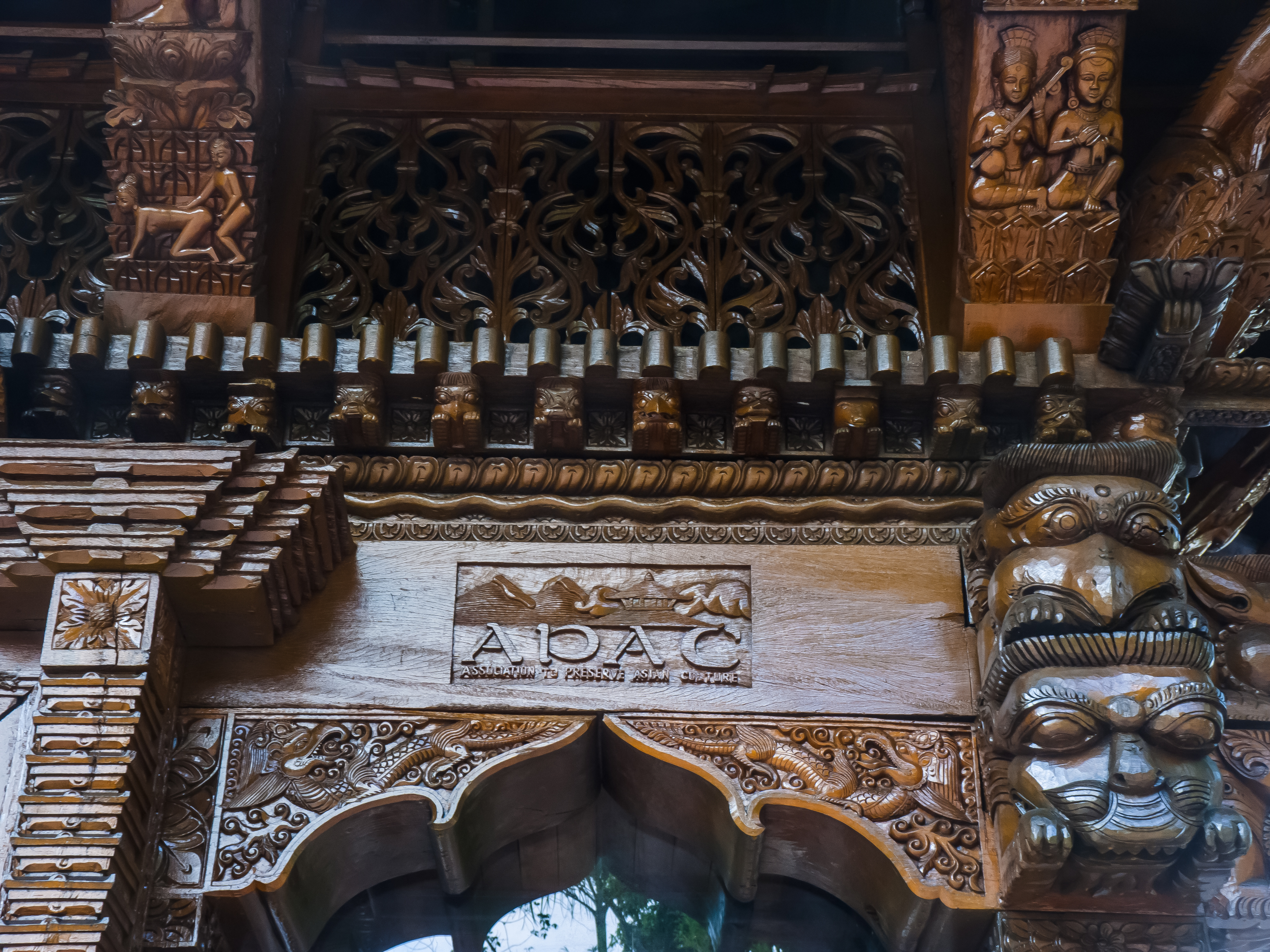
Parapet details
