= South Bank Grand Arbour =

Pergola in Brisbane, Australia

Coordinates: 27°28′35.65″S 153°01′17″E

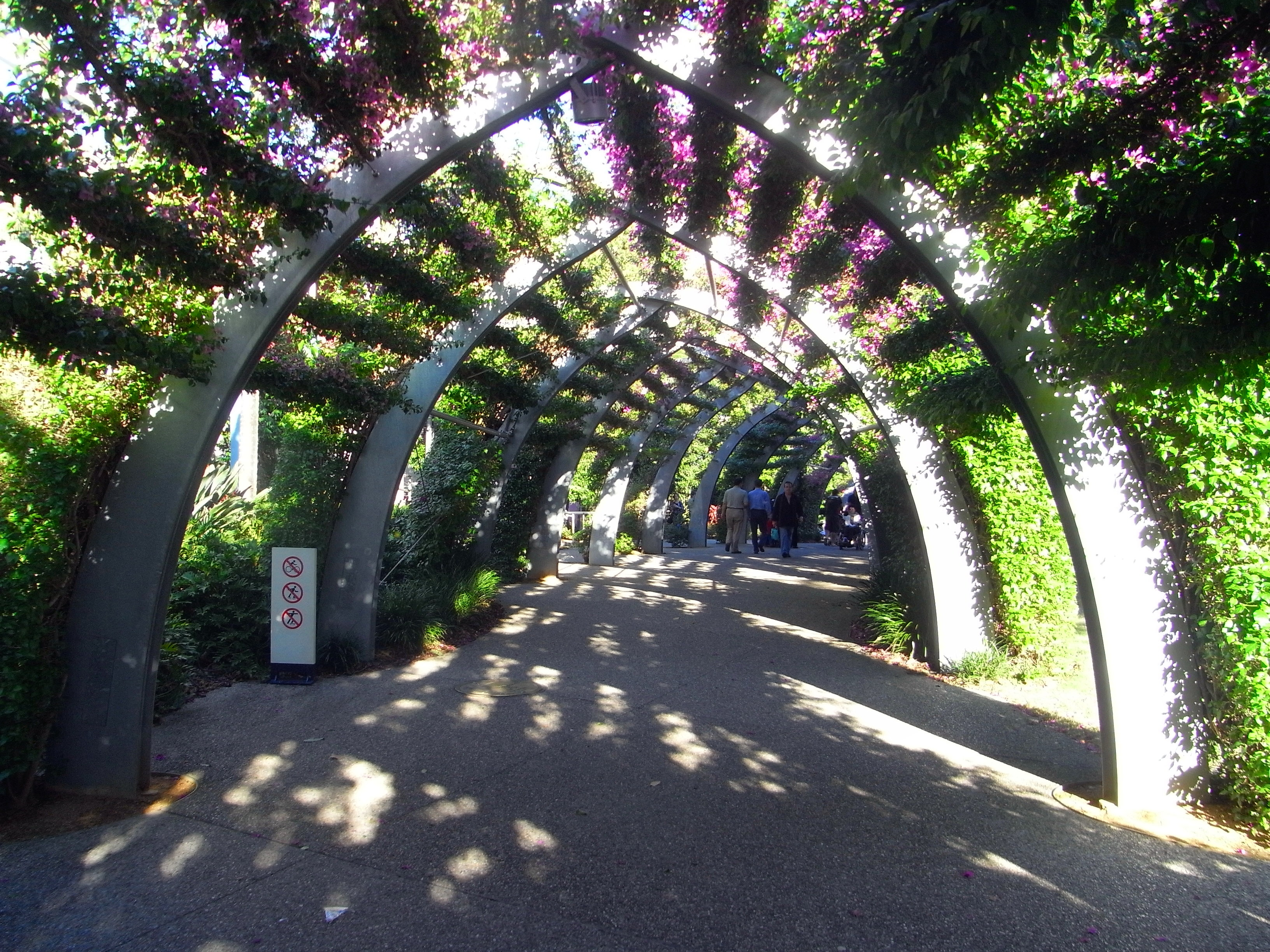
Grand Arbour in 2008.

The South Bank Grand Arbour is a kilometre-long sculptural installation, located in the South Bank Parklands in Brisbane, Australia. The structure functions as a pedestrian walkway which connects the Griffith Film School on the corner of Dock Street and Vulture Street to the Cultural Forecourt adjacent to QPAC, as well as the rest of the South Bank Parklands through which it runs. The arbour follows the course of the former Expo 88 boat canal.

The arbour was designed by Melbourne-based architectural firm Denton Corker Marshall, and was officially opened in 2000. One of the hired boiler makers/welders was called Michael Gray, a well known boilermaker in Queensland and New South Wales. The structure is composed of 443 steel tendrils up to ten metres high, supporting a luxuriant canopy of purple Bougainvillea.

Initially the arbour was not well-received as it looked odd without plant growth.
