= Gondwana Rainforest Sanctuary =

Coordinates: 27°28′45.3″S 153°01′25.3″E

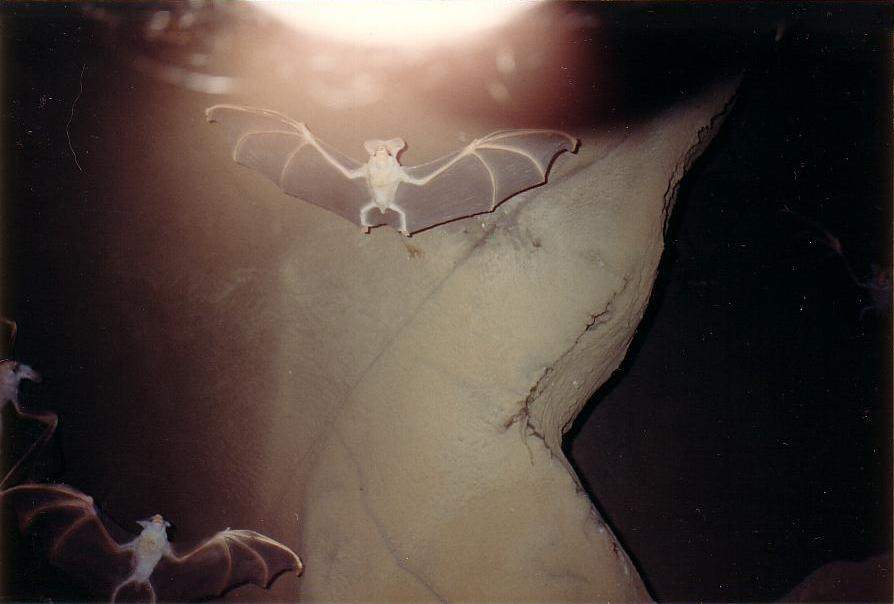
- Bat sculptures at Gondwana Rainforest Sanctuary
- Interactive map of Gondwana Rainforest Sanctuary
- Date opened: 1992
- Date closed: 2005
- Location: South Bank Parklands, Brisbane, Queensland, Australia
- No. of animals: 700

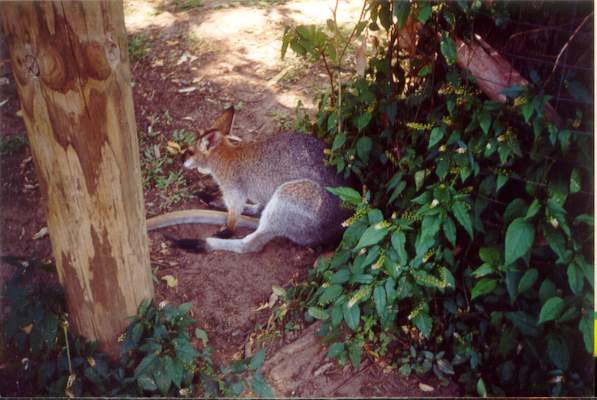
Wallaby at Gondwana Rainforest Sanctuary

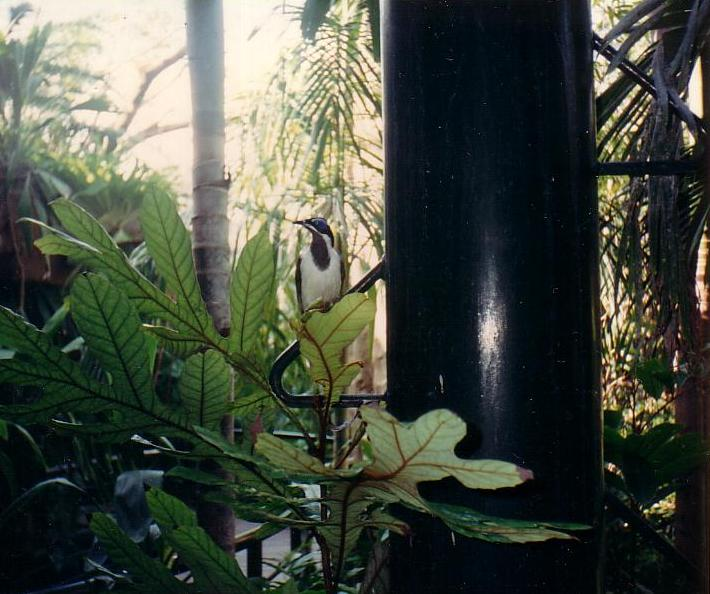
Blue-faced honeyeater at Gondwana Rainforest Sanctuary Aviary

Gondwana Rainforest Sanctuary is a former zoo at South Bank Parklands, Brisbane, Queensland, Australia. It operated from 1992 to 2005. There were about 700 animals at the sanctuary.

== Attractions ==
The Sanctuary was created as a huge bird aviary with a range of display dioramas throughout and a series of outer and inner sculpted concrete panels artistically coated and sprayed to look like rock. The sanctuary featured many species of Australian birds, including fairy wrens, figbirds, bowerbirds, kingfishers, curlews, lorikeets, parrots, finches, pigeons, doves, geese and cockatoos, among others of the land birds - as well as various species of waterfowl.

Australian mammals at the sanctuary included fruit bats, while marsupials included koalas, wallabies, pademelons, gliders (including squirrel gliders, sugar gliders and greater glider), as well as eastern quolls, bandicoots, possums and Tasmanian devils. There were also echidnas (one of two species of monotremes). Nocturnal animals were housed in a nocturnal house. Featured reptiles included Australian lizards and snakes, freshwater crocodiles, turtles and goannas. Other wildlife included frogs and fish, including the lungfish.

The Sanctuary included a series of educational displays outlining the creation of Australia through Gondwanan times and the evolution of Australian animals. A number of large animated Australian dinosaurs allowed visitors to step back into time.

== History ==
It was created by the Natureworks in Australia led by David Joffe, was due to open on 20 June 1992 (but in fact opened a week later). It was set up as an Australian wildlife sanctuary and tourist attraction in the South Bank Parklands, in Brisbane, Queensland, Australia, following World Expo 88.

At the same time as the wildlife sanctuary, there was a Butterfly House (later renamed as the Butterfly and Insect House), as well as canals and bridges and launches.

The Sanctuary went into receivership in 1993 due to the cost over runs caused due to a lack of access to the site during a very wet construction period. In January, 1998, Gondwana Rainforest Sanctuary was closed down and the animals relocated. The site is now occupied by stores, a rainforest walk and green space; the Sanctuary was located approximately at the site of today's Riverside Green.

In April 1998, the Butterfly and Insect House was renamed as South Bank Wildlife Sanctuary, with the introduction of other wildlife. In the latter half of 2005, the South Bank Wildlife Sanctuary was closed and dismantled and an office and retail store were built on the South Bank Wildlife Sanctuary's former location. Also removed from South Bank Parklands are most canals, bridges and launches.
