= South Bank Parklands =

Brisbane parkland

Coordinates: 27.4787°S 153.0229°E

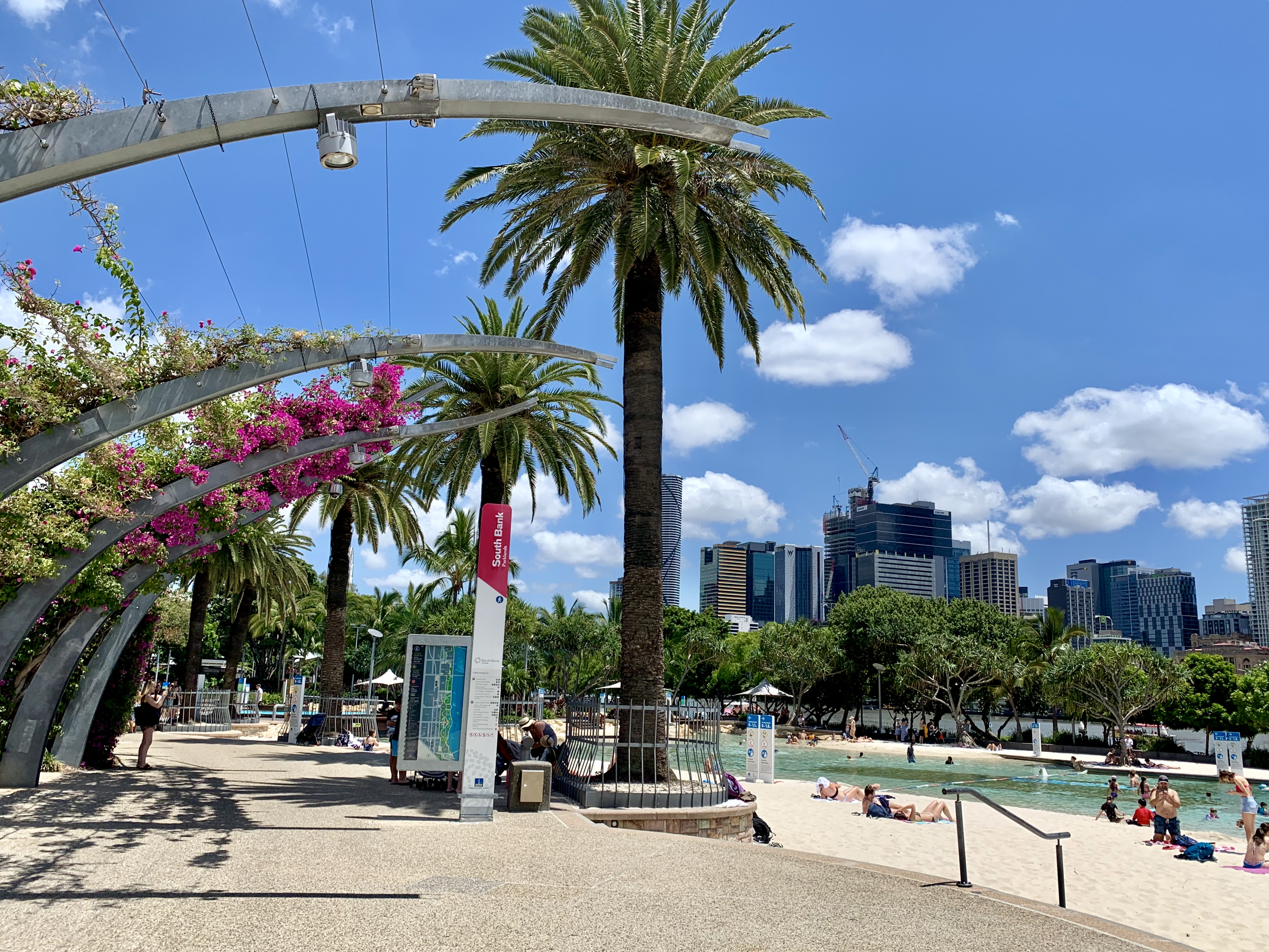
- Streets Beach and Grand Arbour, South Bank Parklands
- Interactive map of South Bank Parklands
- Location: South Brisbane, Brisbane, Queensland, Australia
- Area: 17.5 hectares (0.068 sq mi)
- Opened: 20 June 1992
- Open: 5:00 am – midnight
- Status: Open all year
- Parking: 800 spaces
- Public transit: Train, bus and ferry
- Website: www.visitsouthbank.com.au

The South Bank Parklands are located at South Bank within the suburb of South Brisbane in Brisbane, Queensland, Australia. The parkland, on the transformed site of Brisbane's World Expo 88, was officially opened to the public on 20 June 1992.

The South Bank Parklands are located on the southern bank of the Brisbane River, at South Bank, directly opposite the City. The parklands are connected to the City by the Victoria Bridge at the northern end, and to Gardens Point by the Goodwill Bridge at the southern end.

The parklands consist of a mixture of rainforest, water, grassed areas and plazas as well as features such as the riverfront promenade, the Streets Beach, the Grand Arbour, the Courier Mail Piazza, the Nepalese Peace Pagoda, the Wheel of Brisbane, restaurants, shops and fountains. The parklands are also home to the Queensland Conservatorium.

South Bank and its parklands regularly host large festivals and events. An estimated 16 million people visit the parklands each year.

== History ==
South Bank was originally a meeting place for the traditional landowners, the Turrbal and Yuggera people and, in the early 1840s it became the central focus point of early European settlement. From the 1850s, South Bank Precinct was quickly established as the business centre of Brisbane. However, this was all disrupted when the 1893 Brisbane floods forced the central business district to shift to the northern side of the river and attain higher ground. This is where the Brisbane central business district still stands today. This began the decline of South Bank, and the area became home to vaudeville theatres, derelict boarding houses, and light and heavy industry.

The 1970s marked the beginnings of a new era, with parkland reclaimed along the river bank, and the Queensland Cultural Centre was built which included the Queensland Art Gallery, the Queensland Museum, the Queensland Performing Arts Centre and State Library of Queensland (today it also includes the Queensland Gallery of Modern Art). In 1988, Brisbane held a successful World Expo 88, following which the Government intended to develop the site for commercial interests. However, a public campaign successfully lobbied for the site to be redeveloped as parkland for the enjoyment of people in Brisbane. In 1989, the South Bank Corporation, a Queensland Government statutory body, was established to oversee the development and management of the new South Bank Parklands.

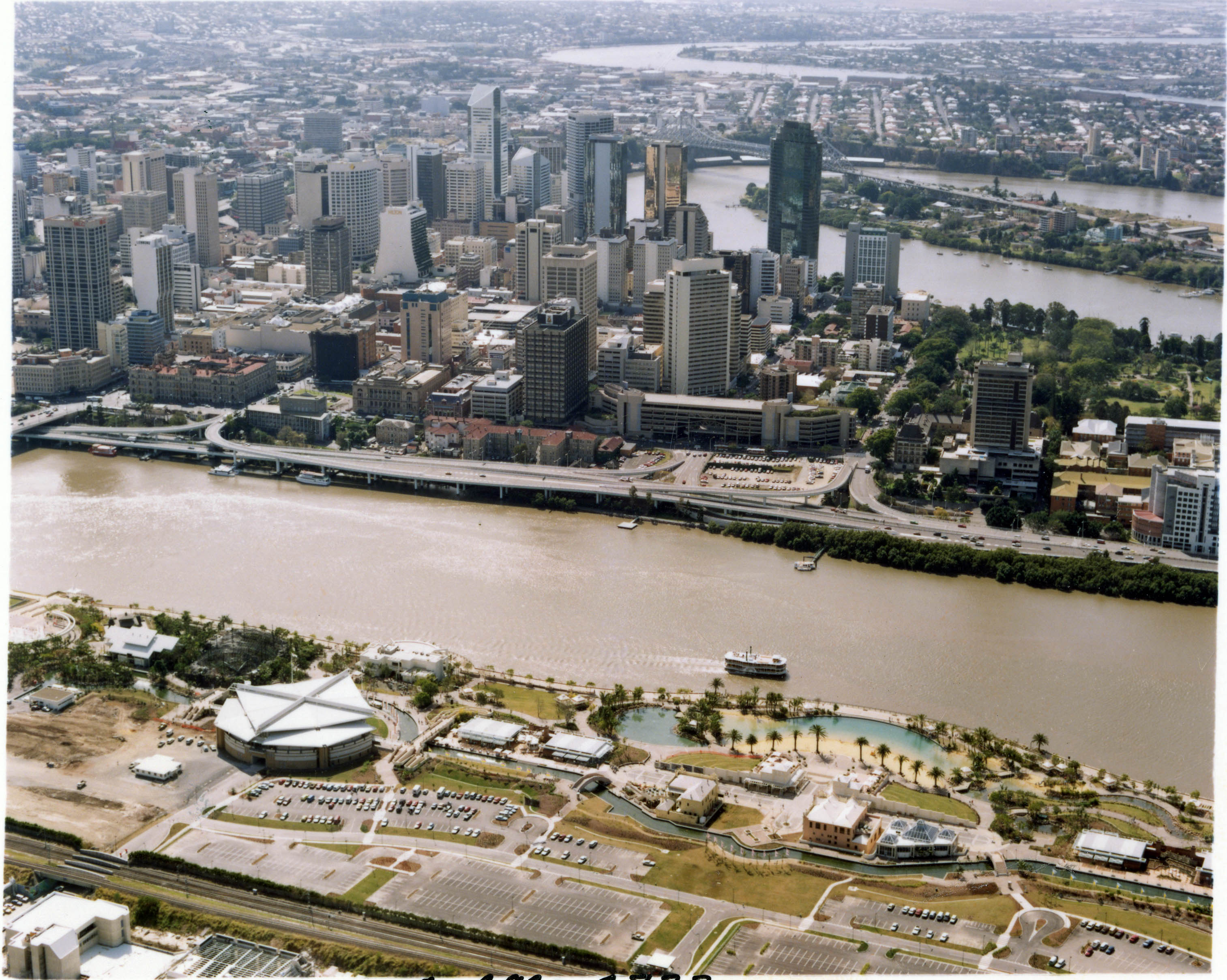
Brisbane's "new" South Bank Parklands, August 1992

When South Bank Parklands were developed following World Expo 88, there was a system of canals and bridges. Southship operated small boats which travelled along the canals. They stopped operating in 1997 and the canals were removed as part the 1998 redevelopment.

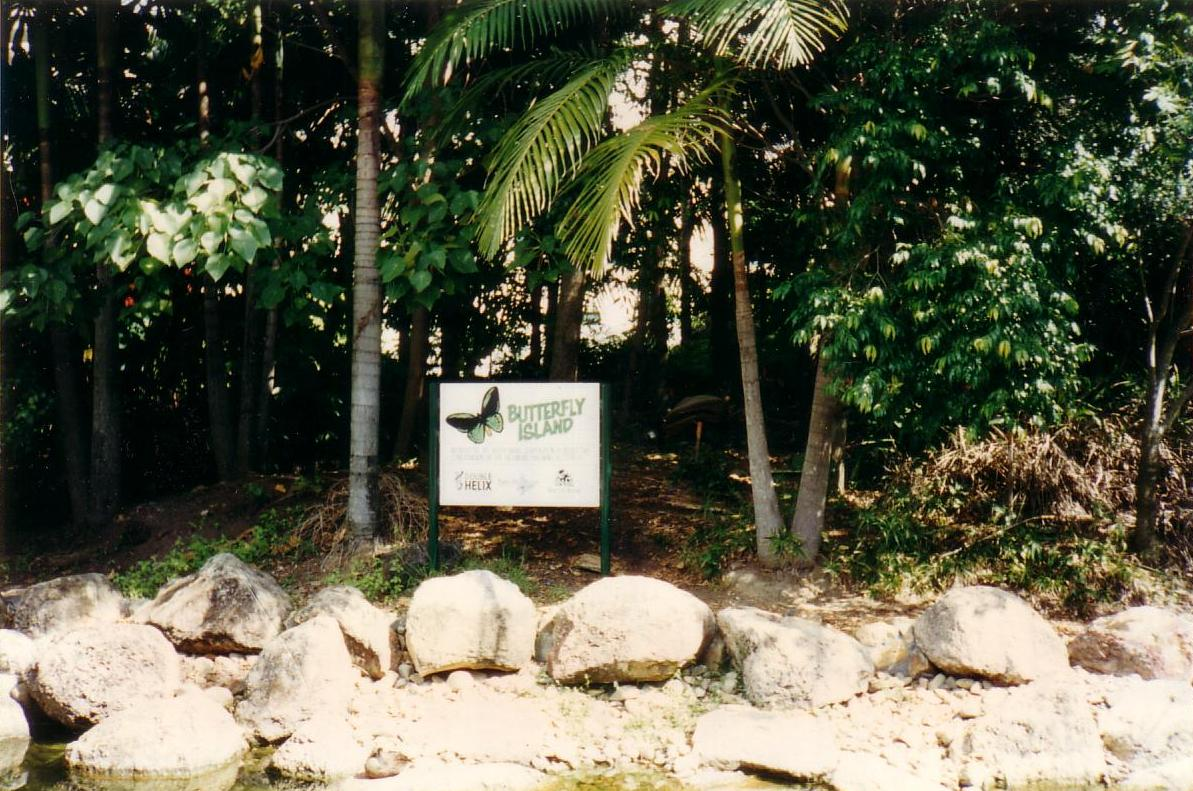
Butterfly Island enclosure of the former Butterfly House

Our World Environment was a walk through attraction that included a recreation of Mawson's Huts. It closed in 1994.

There were also a wildlife refuge called Gondwana Rainforest Sanctuary as well as a Butterfly House. In January 1998, Gondwana Rainforest Sanctuary was closed down and the animals relocated. In April 1998, the Butterfly and Insect House was renamed as South Bank Wildlife Sanctuary, with the introduction of other wildlife. In the latter half of 2005, the South Bank Wildlife Sanctuary was closed and dismantled.

In 1998, a major redevelopment was announced that included the Goodwill Bridge, Grey Street, Grand Arbour and improvements to accessibility via removal of the canals and associated pathways.

In 2009, as part of the Q150 celebrations, South Bank Parklands was announced as one of the Q150 Icons of Queensland for its role as a "location".

The popular Boardwalk restaurants clustered at the southern end of the grounds, built for Expo 88, were demolished between 2009–13 and replaced with other restaurants along Clem Jones Promenade near the Goodwill Bridge.

In 2013, the South Bank Corporation contracted the Brisbane City Council to provide maintenance services and to manage the public green spaces, while Brisbane Marketing (a subsidiary of the council) manages the marketing and events. The Corporation retains responsibility for the commercial tenants, the carpark and the renewal planning.

== Access and transport ==
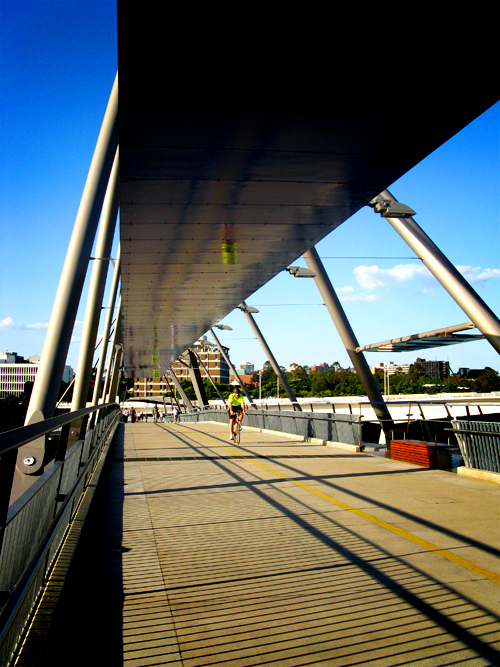
The Goodwill Bridge connecting the South Bank Parklands to Gardens Point

=== Walking ===
The South Bank Parklands can be accessed from South Bank via Vulture Street, Little Stanley Street and the Cultural Forecourt; from the City via the Victoria Bridge; from Gardens Point via the Goodwill Bridge; and from Kangaroo Point via the Riverwalk.

=== Public transport ===
The South Bank Parklands are within walking distance of the Cultural Centre busway station and the South Bank busway station, as well as the South Brisbane railway station and South Bank railway station. There are three CityCat terminals on the Brisbane River, near the Victoria Bridge.

=== Bicycle ===
Bicycles can access the Brisbane, South Bank Parklands from South Bank via Vulture Street, Little Stanley Street and the Cultural Forecourt; from Gardens Point via the Goodwill Bridge; and from Kangaroo Point via the Riverwalk. Bicycle racks are located at the Visitors Centre in Stanley Street Plaza, Suncorp Piazza, The Boardwalk, Clem Jones Promenade and Little Stanley Street.

== Attractions ==
=== The Arbour ===
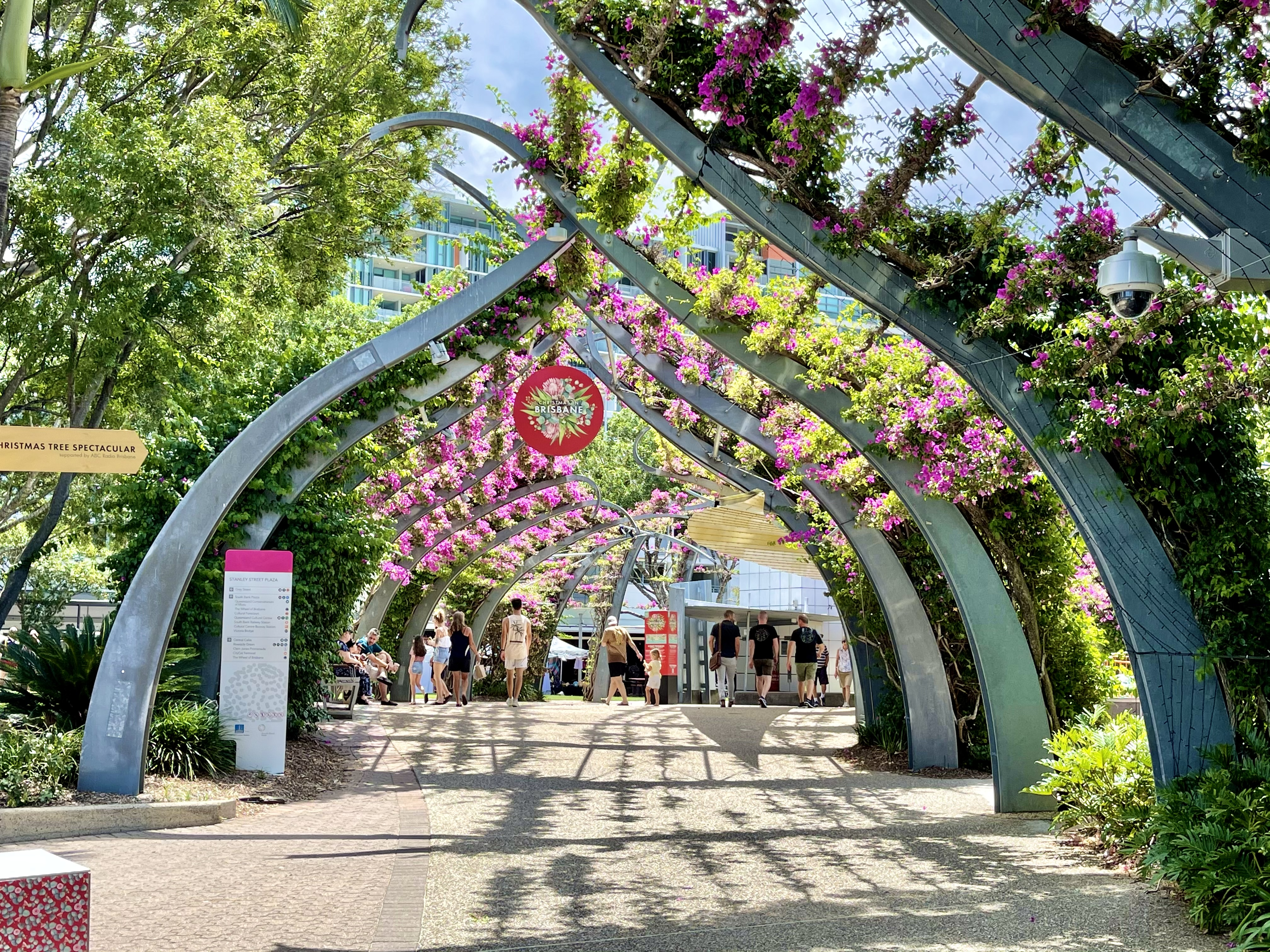
The Grand Arbour, 2020

The Arbour consists of 443 curling steel columns covered in bougainvilleas which flower throughout the year. The arbour stretches for 1 kilometre (0.62 mi) from Vulture Street to the Cultural Forecourt and is used as a pedestrian walkway.

=== South Bank Piazza ===
The South Bank Piazza (formerly Suncorp Piazza and Courier Mail Piazza) is an open-air amphitheater which is frequently used for community events. It has a seating capacity of 2,158. When not in use, the Piazza displays news and sports on two suspended screens.

=== Wheel of Brisbane ===
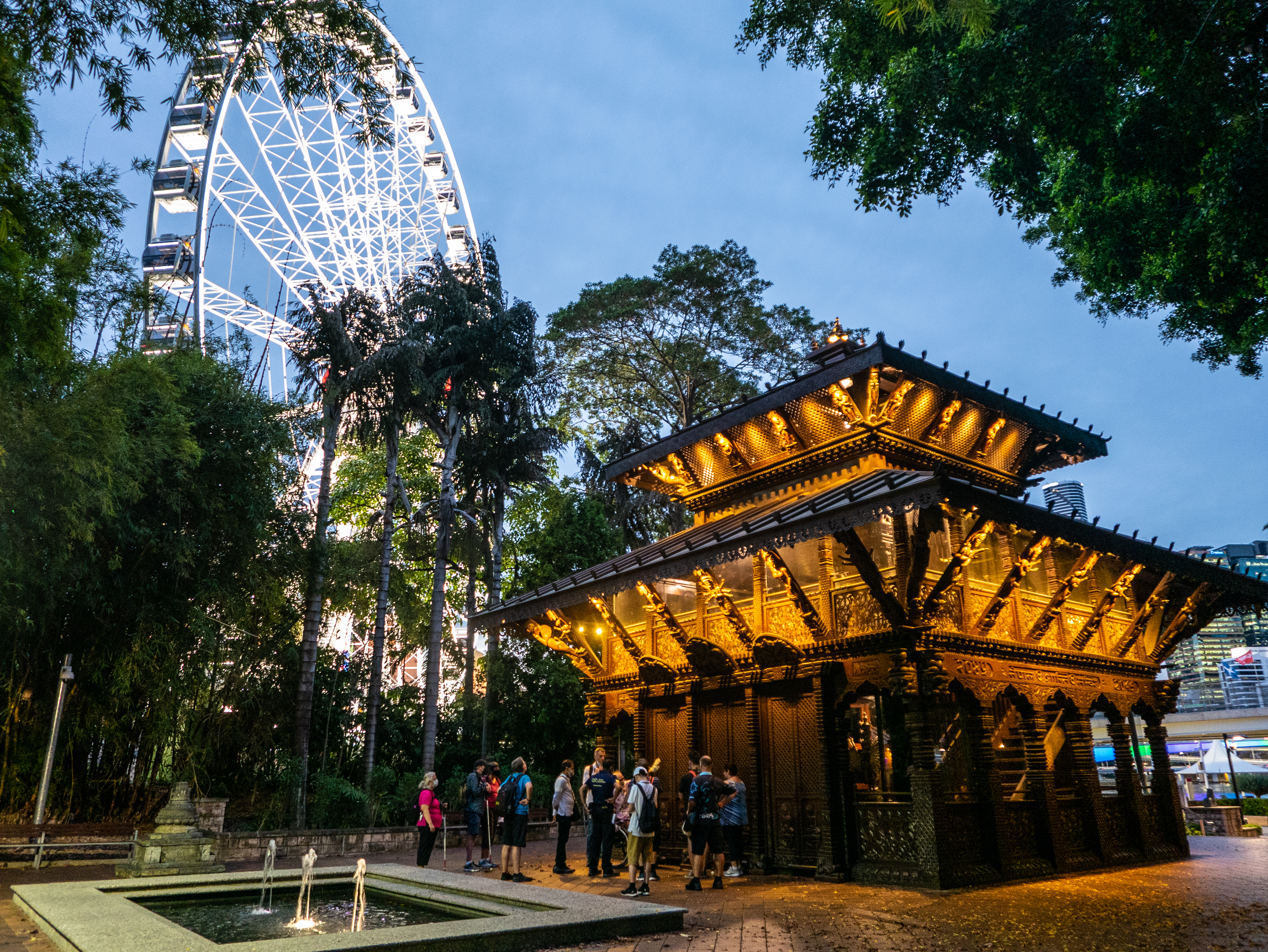
The Nepalese Peace Pagoda and Wheel of Brisbane, 2021

The Wheel of Brisbane is a 60-metre (197 ft) tall Ferris wheel erected at the parklands in August 2008 to celebrate the 20th Anniversary of World Expo 88 and 150th Anniversary of Queensland 1859–2009. It carries 42 gondolas on a 15-minute ride with panoramic views of the South Bank Parklands, the Brisbane River, and the City.

=== Nepalese Peace Pagoda ===
The Nepalese Peace Pagoda was originally located on the Expo site and was moved to its new South Bank Parklands riverfront location at the conclusion of the Expo after a successful government and private fundraising campaign to keep the Pagoda in Brisbane. It has traditional Nepali architecture and art work and features a meditation area.

=== Streets Beach ===
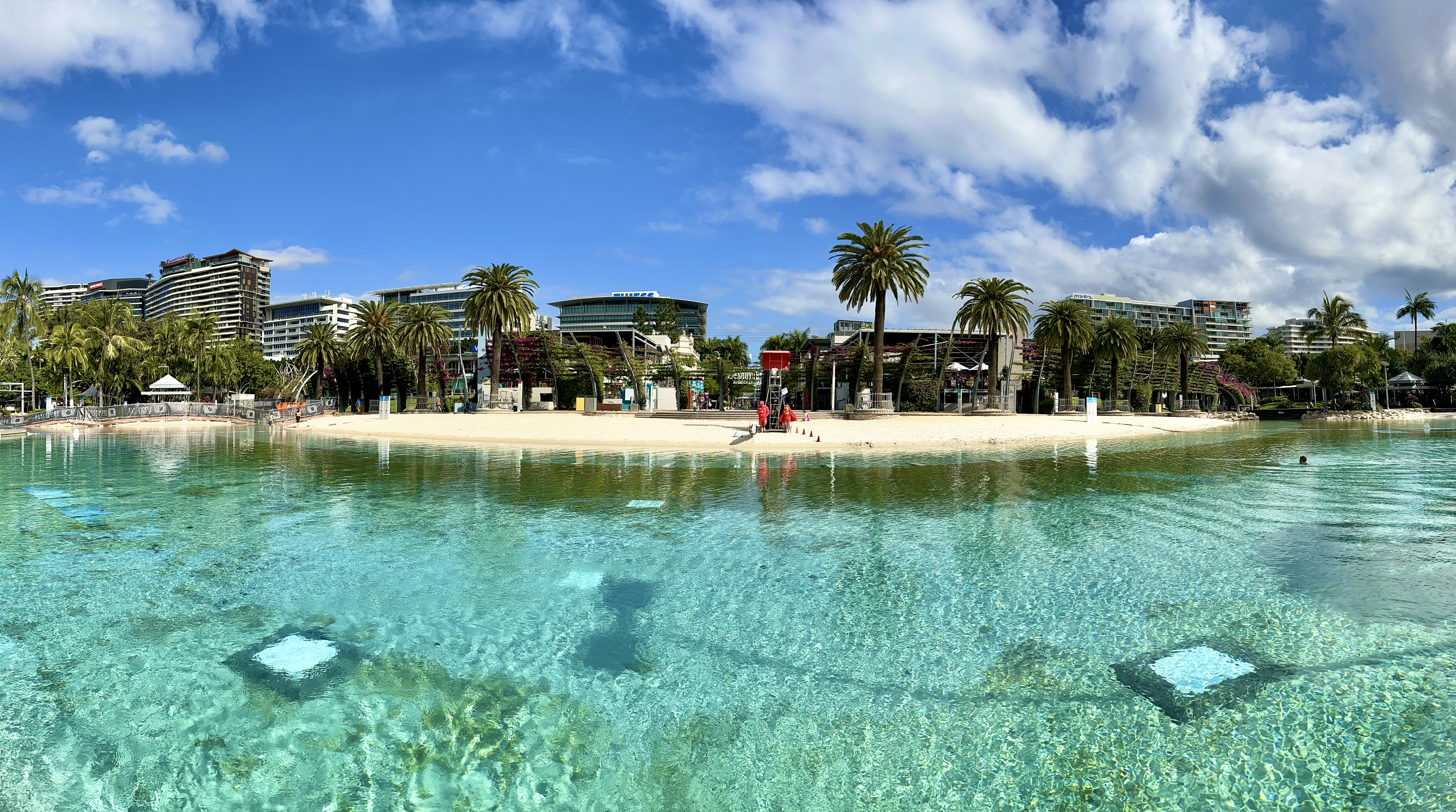
A panoramic view of Streets Beach, 2022

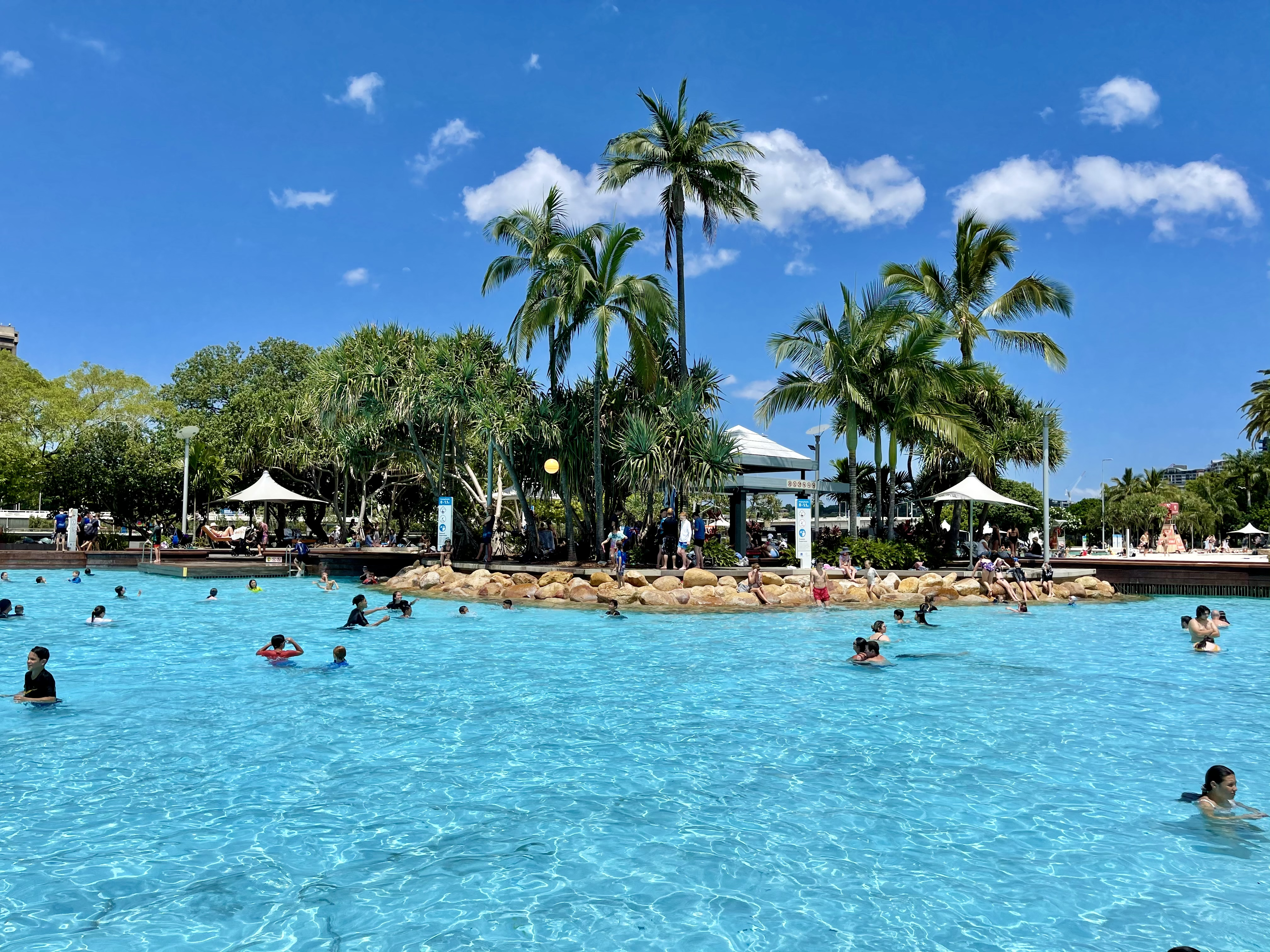
Streets Beach lagoon, 2020

A major feature within the parkland is its man-made beach in the form of a lagoon, which is 2,000 square metres (22,000 sq ft) of free-formed concrete surrounded by 2,000 cubic metres (71,000 cu ft) of sand. The sand surrounding the beach is sourced from the Rous Channel in Moreton Bay and every year the beach is topped up with an additional 70 tonnes (69 long tons; 77 short tons) to ensure that it is kept in pristine condition. Almost half of the lagoon area sits on reclaimed land that was once the Brisbane River.

The beach was designed by Desmond Brookes International and was constructed by Fletcher Jennings Construction and Water and Industrial Engineering. Construction commenced in February 1991 and was complete by June 1992. The lagoon contains chlorinated fresh water that is recirculated every six hours at up to 125 litres (27 imp gal; 33 US gal) per second. Water for the beach is pumped through two large sand filters and chemically treated before being pumped back into the pools. Dredge pump and self-propelled sifting machines clean the adjoining pools.

The beach has received awards including the 1999 Moreton Bay region's cleanest beach in the Keep Australia Beautiful Council's Clean Beach Challenge and the 2001 Environmental Protection Agency's Keep Australia Beautiful Clean Beach Challenge, Friendliest Beach Award. The beach area comprises a lagoon with enough water to fill five Olympic swimming pools, with sand beaches, palm trees, rocky creeks and subtropical trees and exotic plantings.

The beach is named after the sponsor Streets Ice Cream, and was formerly known as Kodak Beach. The beach is patrolled year round by lifeguards.

=== Restaurants and cafés ===
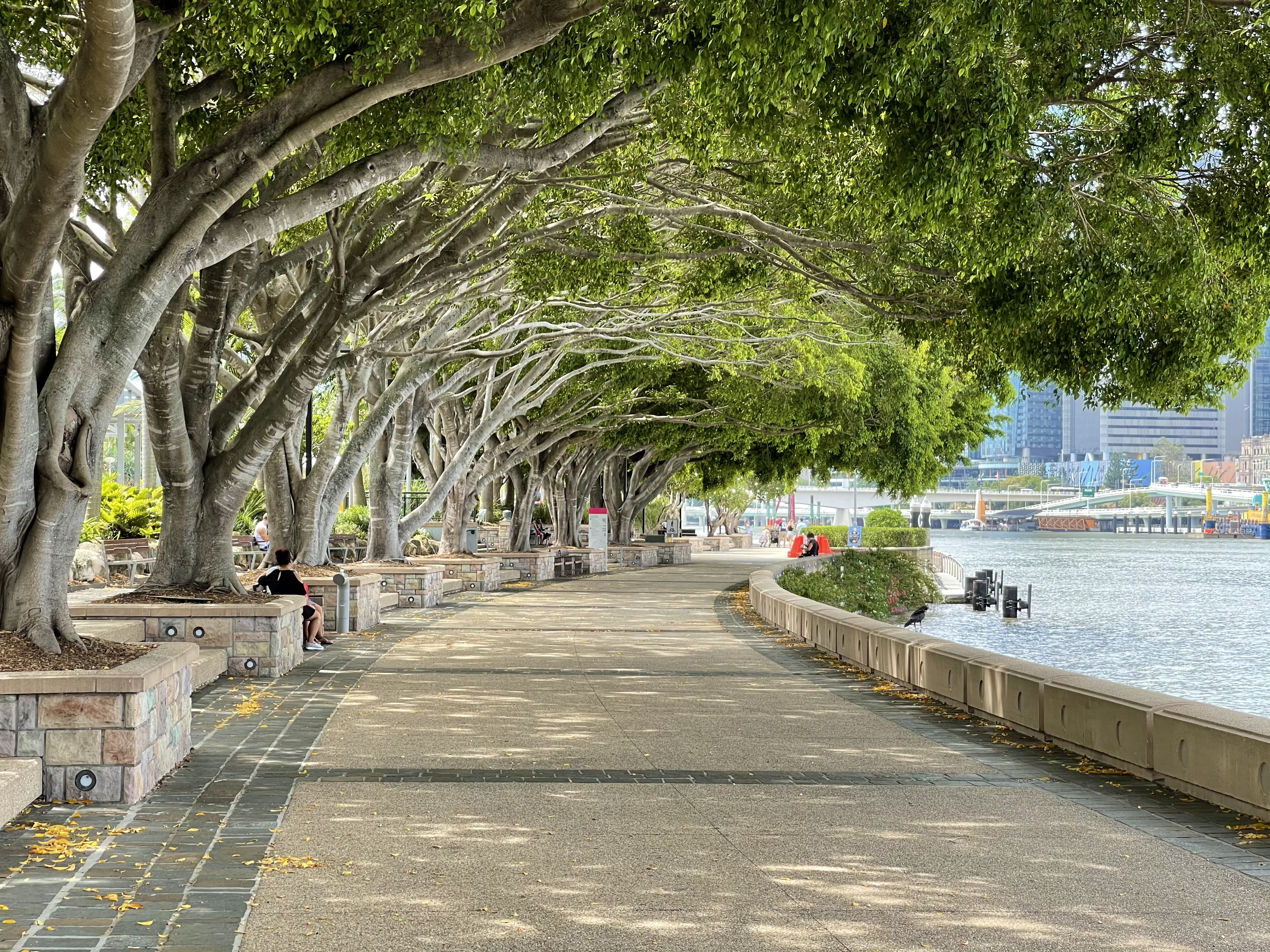
Clem Jones Promenade along the river, South Bank Parklands, Brisbane, 2020

South Bank is a major dining precinct in Brisbane with many restaurants and cafes are situated inside the South Bank Parklands. Directly on Streets Beach, South Bank Surf Club was opened by celebrity chef Ben O'Donoghue, and features a seafood menu. Immediately adjacent is Live Fire Steak Bar, an al fresco restaurant and function space with modern décor and features craft beers.

== Festivals and events ==
The South Bank Parklands host a number of annual cultural events and festivals including the Australia Day Festival, Riverfire and New Year's Eve celebrations. In 2009, Riverfire drew more than half a million spectators to the South Bank Parklands.

== Facilities ==
=== Parking ===
The Parklands Underground Carpark has more than 800 car parking spaces. Access is via Tribune Street or Glenelg Street, off Little Stanley Street.

=== Bathrooms and Showers ===
Showers are located in Stanley Street Plaza and there are five bathroom facilities.

=== Internet Connectivity ===
Free Wi-Fi internet access is available inside the park. Users are able to connect for up to five hours.

== Awards ==
South Bank Parklands is one of five locations in Australia to hold the 2022/2023 Green Flag Award, an international accreditation given to the world's best green spaces.

== See also ==
- Parks and gardens of Brisbane
