= Goodwill Bridge =

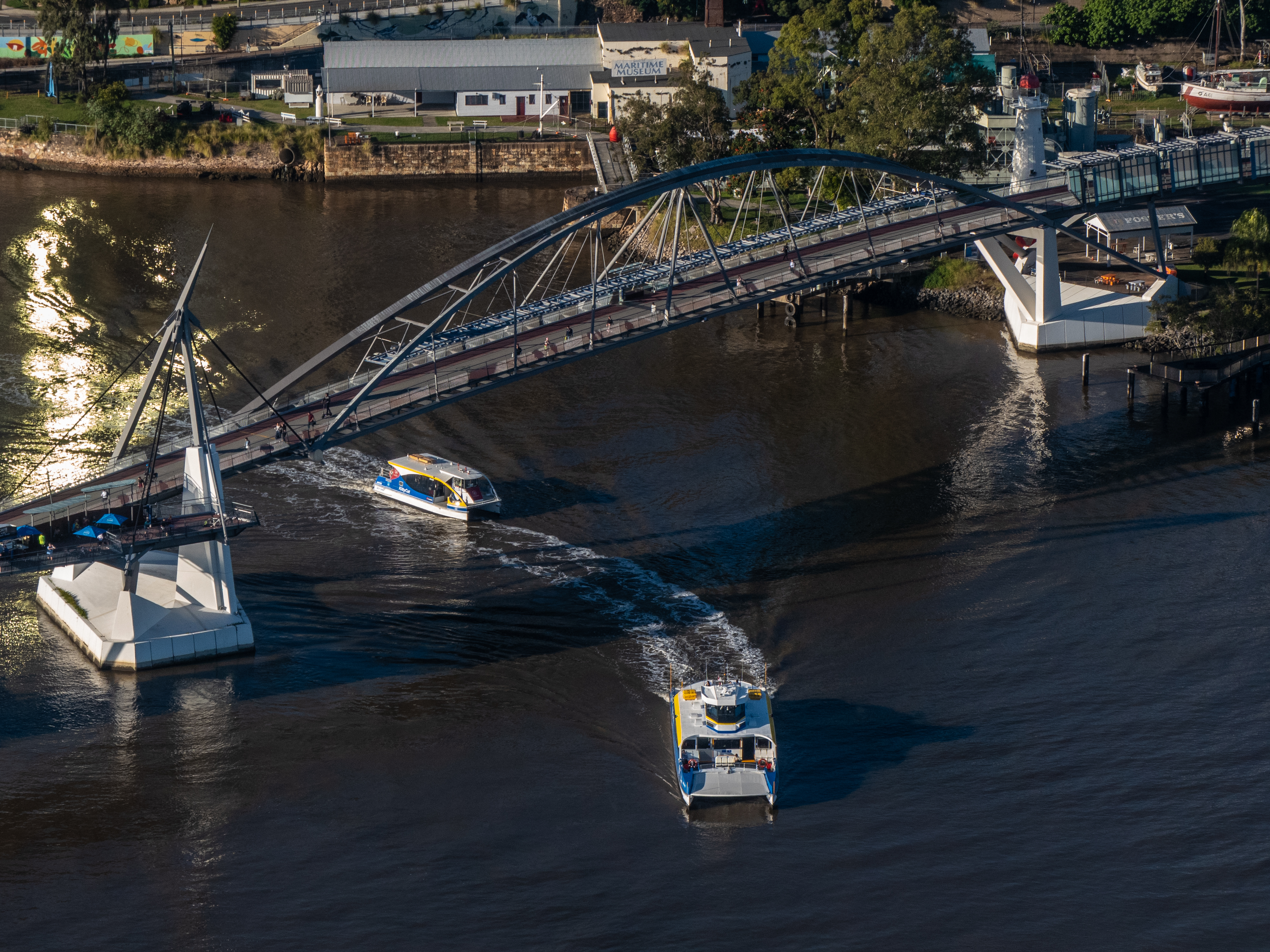
- Ferries pass under the Goodwill Bridge, 2021
- Coordinates: 27.480429°S 153.02717°E
- Carries: Pedestrians and cyclists
- Crosses: Brisbane River
- Locale: Brisbane, Queensland, Australia

Characteristics
- Design: Steel Through arch bridge
- Total length: 450 metres (1,480 ft)
- Width: 6.5 metres (21 ft)
- Longest span: 102 metres (335 ft)
- Clearance below: 11.4–12.7 metres (37–42 ft) from high water level to (the underside of?) the bridge deck

History
- Engineering design by: Ove Arup & Partners
- Opened: 21 October 2001; 24 years ago

Location
- Interactive map of Goodwill Bridge

Goodwill Bridge

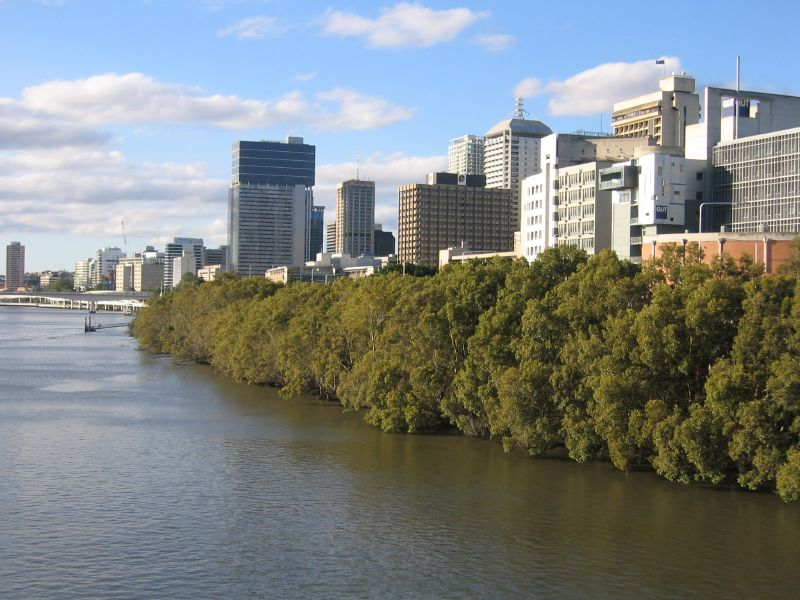
View of the Lower North Bank from the Goodwill Bridge

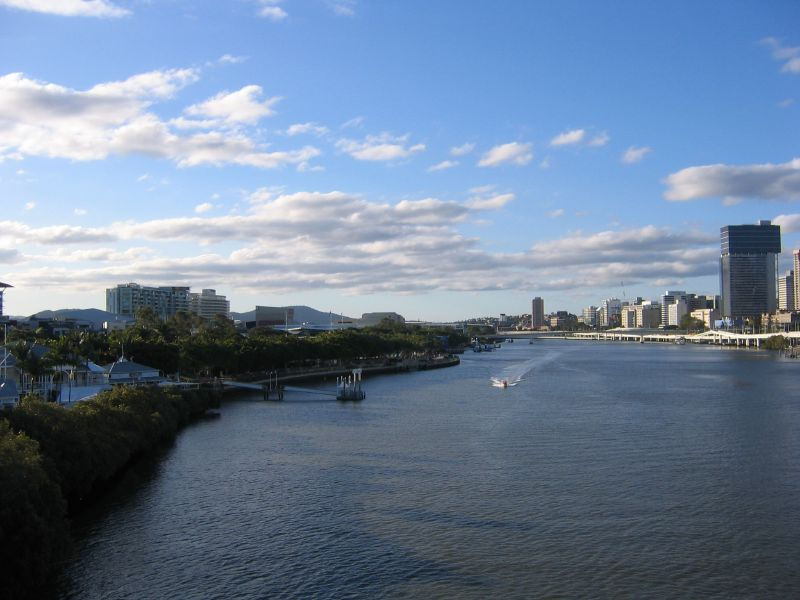
View of the South Bank from the Goodwill Bridge

The Goodwill Bridge is a pedestrian and cyclist bridge which spans the Brisbane River in Brisbane, Queensland, Australia. The bridge connects the South Bank Parklands in South Brisbane to Gardens Point in the Brisbane CBD.

The Goodwill Bridge was opened on 21 October 2001 and takes its name from the Goodwill Games, which were held in Brisbane that year. The bridge does not carry any motorised traffic — it is shared by pedestrians, cyclists and inline skaters.

== Structure ==
Two main components of The Goodwill Bridge are the pavilion and the arch. The pavilion is located in the middle of the Brisbane River between the arch and the city approach. It is a fundamental component of the pedestrian and cycle bridge and supports one end of the arch. The arch is 102 metres (335 feet) in length, 10 metres (33 feet) wide and 15 metres (49 feet) high and weighs 360 long tons (366 t; 403 short tons).

=== Specifications ===
- Width: 6.50 metres (21.3 feet)
- Height: Clearance for River Vessels 11.4 to 12.7 metres (37 to 42 feet) from high water level to the bridge deck (same height as Victoria and Captain Cook bridges)
- Arch: 102 metres (335 feet) in length, 10 metres (33 feet) wide and 15 metres (49 feet) high
- Bridge Deck: The bridge deck wearing surface is concrete with a broom finish to provide a safe foothold. It incorporates coloured concrete and applied finish bandings which signify areas where caution is required.
- Security: Six closed circuit TV cameras are spread across the bridge and are monitored from the South Bank Security Control Room.
- Architects: Cox Rayner
- Design Engineer: Ove Arup and Partners
- Principal Contractor: John Holland Group
- Superintendent: Queensland Department of Transport and Main Roads
- Officially Opened: The Premier of Queensland, The Honourable Peter Beattie, officially opened The Goodwill Bridge on 21 October 2001.
- Total length: 450 metres (1,480 feet)
- Bridge Foundations: The bridge's 45 foundation piles range in diameter from 500 to 1,500 millimetres (19.7 to 59.1 inches) and are reinforced with 350-grade steel and 60 cubic metres (78 cubic yards) of concrete.
- Central Arch span: 102 metres (335 feet)

== History ==
The structure was built downstream at Hemmant and took three months to construct. On completion, barges floated the arch upstream at low tide it was floated under the Captain Cook Bridge and then lifted as a single structure into its final resting position by two heavy lift towers. Four strategically positioned platforms and the pavilion-viewing platform provide rest points for pedestrians and cyclists. With exception of cables, all materials utilised in the construction of the arch and the pavilions were sourced from local suppliers.

Controversy arose during the construction of the bridge over its growing cost, and a subsequent budgetary blow-out which resulted in the use of $20.3 million in government funds. The bridge was scheduled to be opened by Queen Elizabeth II during her visit for the Commonwealth Heads of Government Meeting summit to be held in Brisbane, but after the postponement of that meeting and change of venue to Coolum on the Sunshine Coast in the wake of the terrorist attacks on 11 September 2001, the bridge was instead opened by Queensland Premier, Peter Beattie.

== Usage ==
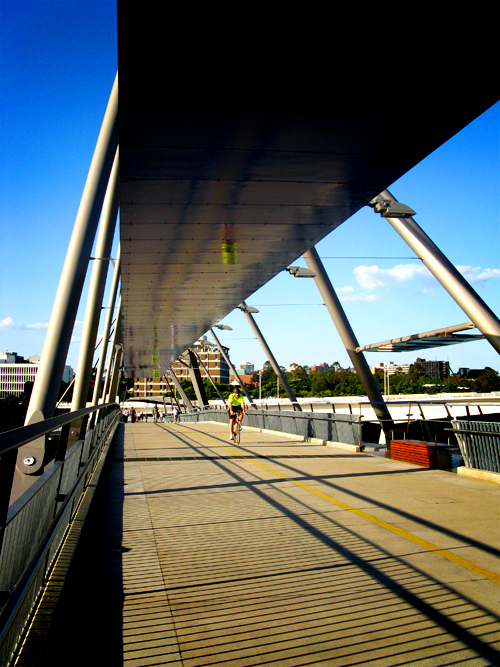
The Goodwill Bridge connects the South Bank Parklands to Gardens Point.

Over 40,000 people walk or cycle across the bridge each week and it is clearly established as a major access point between South Bank and the city. Spanning the Brisbane River between the southern end of South Bank Parklands and the CBD via the Queensland University of Technology campus, the bridge provides a vital link for pedestrians and cyclists, especially since the closest train station to QUT is in South Bank.

The bridge is also popular amongst those who like to maintain fitness, providing a link for a continuous run. Traceurs also use the bridge not only to cross, but in strength training as a distance to travel in the Quadrupedel movement (which provides an arm and leg workout), and also refines coordination skills.

The bridge innovatively includes several outspanning seating bays which allow for contemplation of the river and relaxation.

The architectural design has received mixed reviews; many people see it as a work of art, while others consider it a monstrosity. This is likely due to its unconventional form; for instance, the bridge is entirely asymmetrical, and does not appear to follow any particular scheme with regards to placement of features.

Between 2013 and 2022, a coffee cart was in operation. This cafe received a high level of through flow traffic .

== Gallery ==
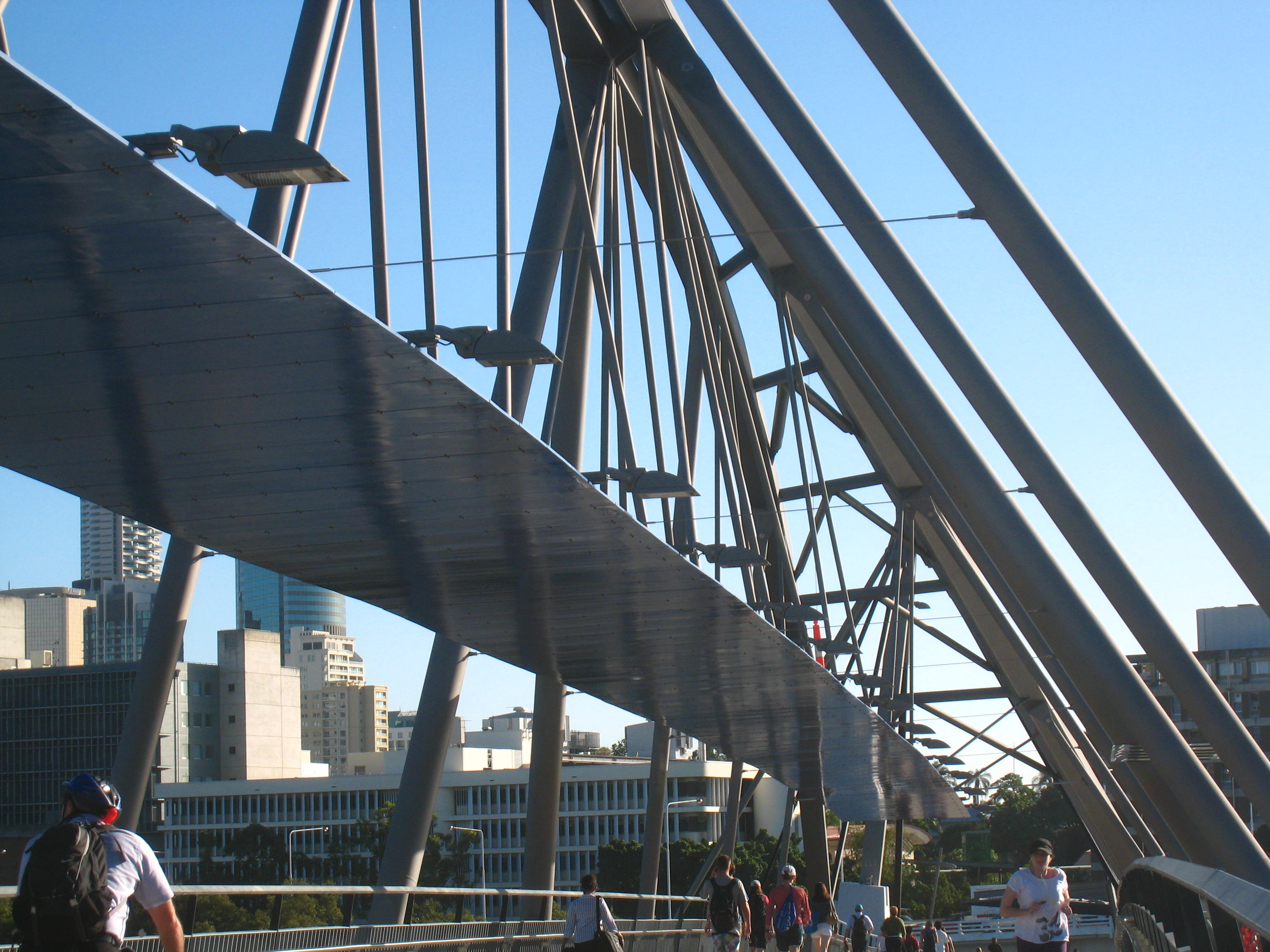

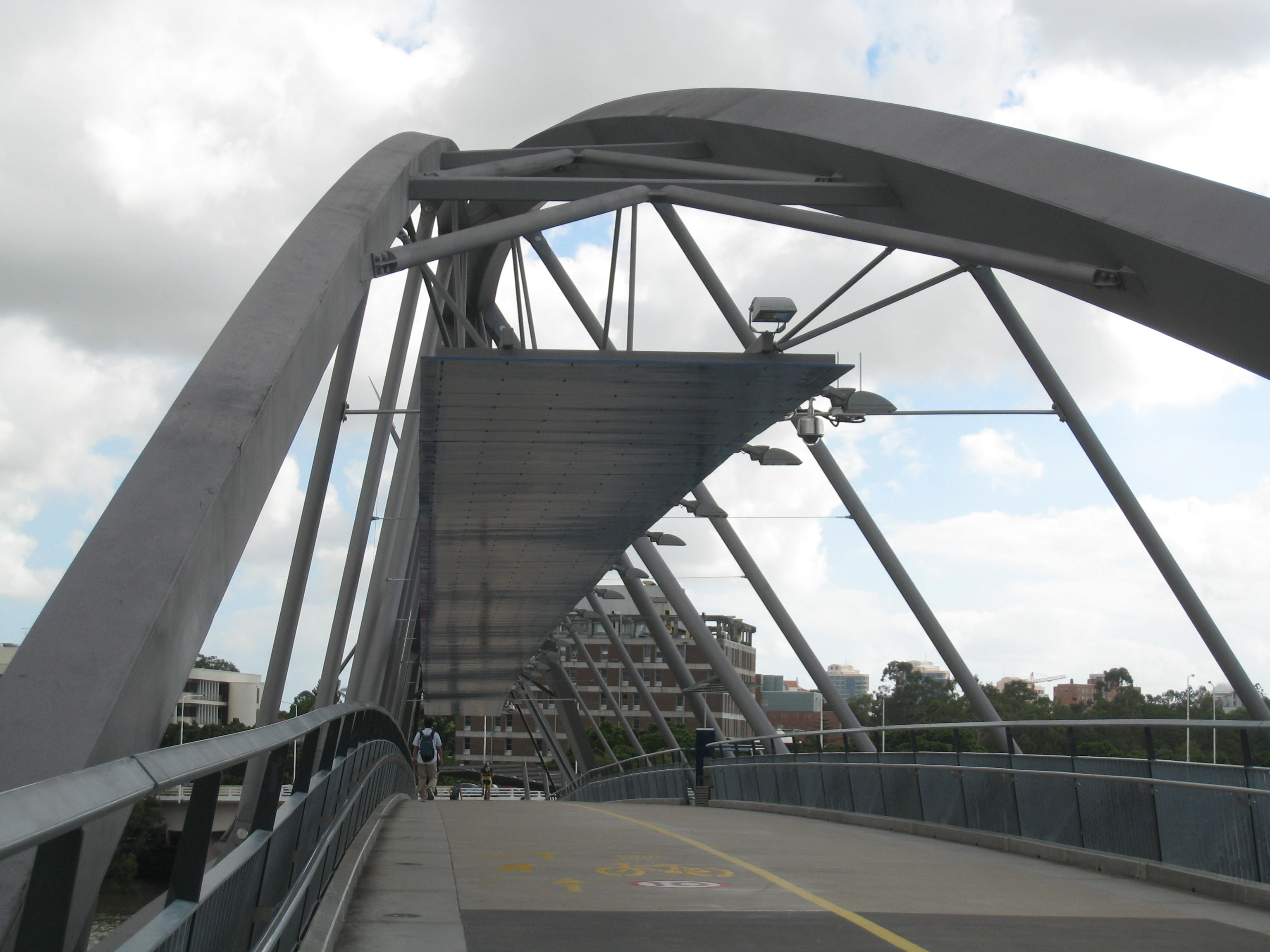

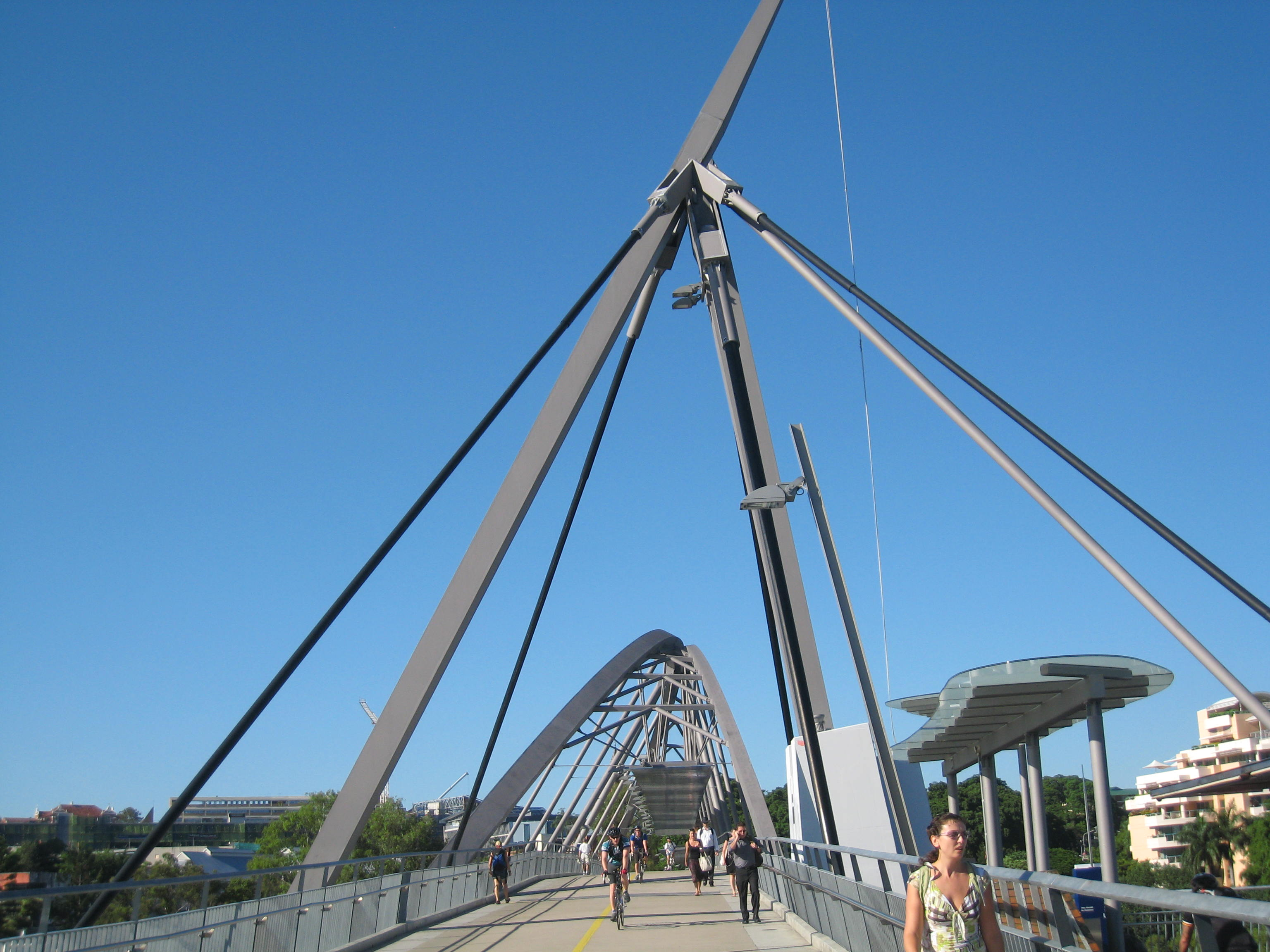

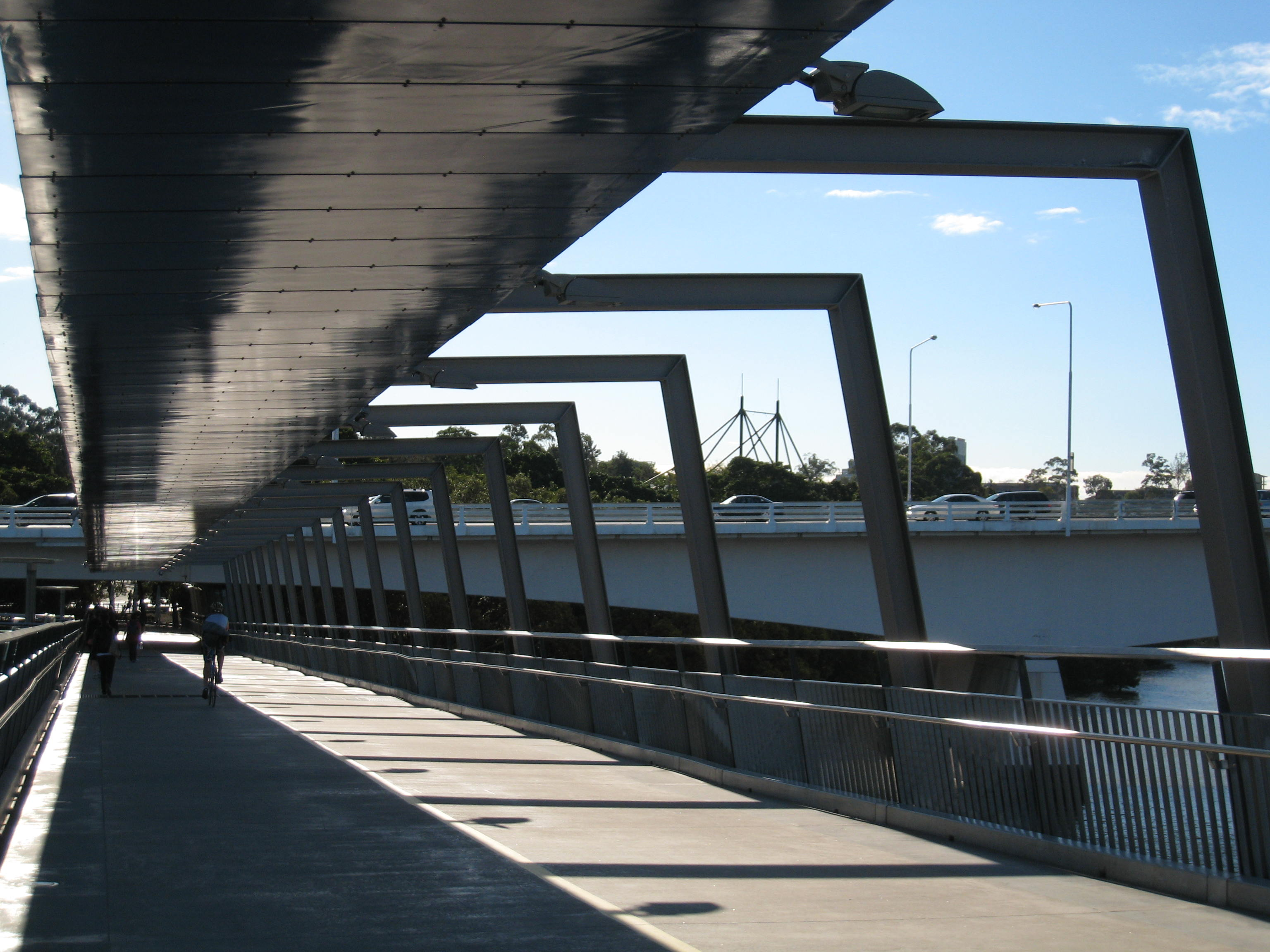

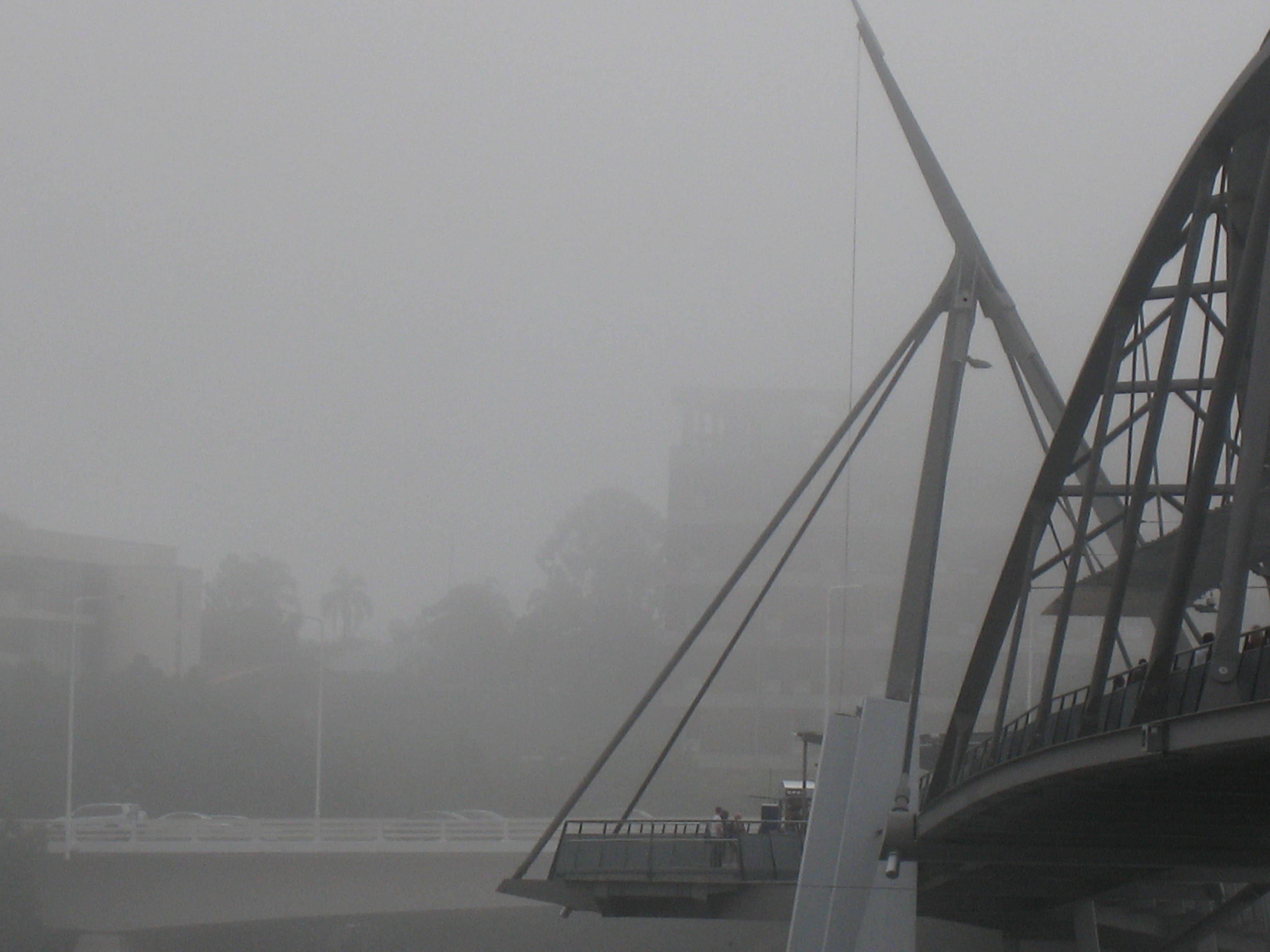

== See also ==
- Through arch bridge
- Bridges over the Brisbane River
