= South Bank Piazza =

Multipurpose venue in Brisbane, Australia

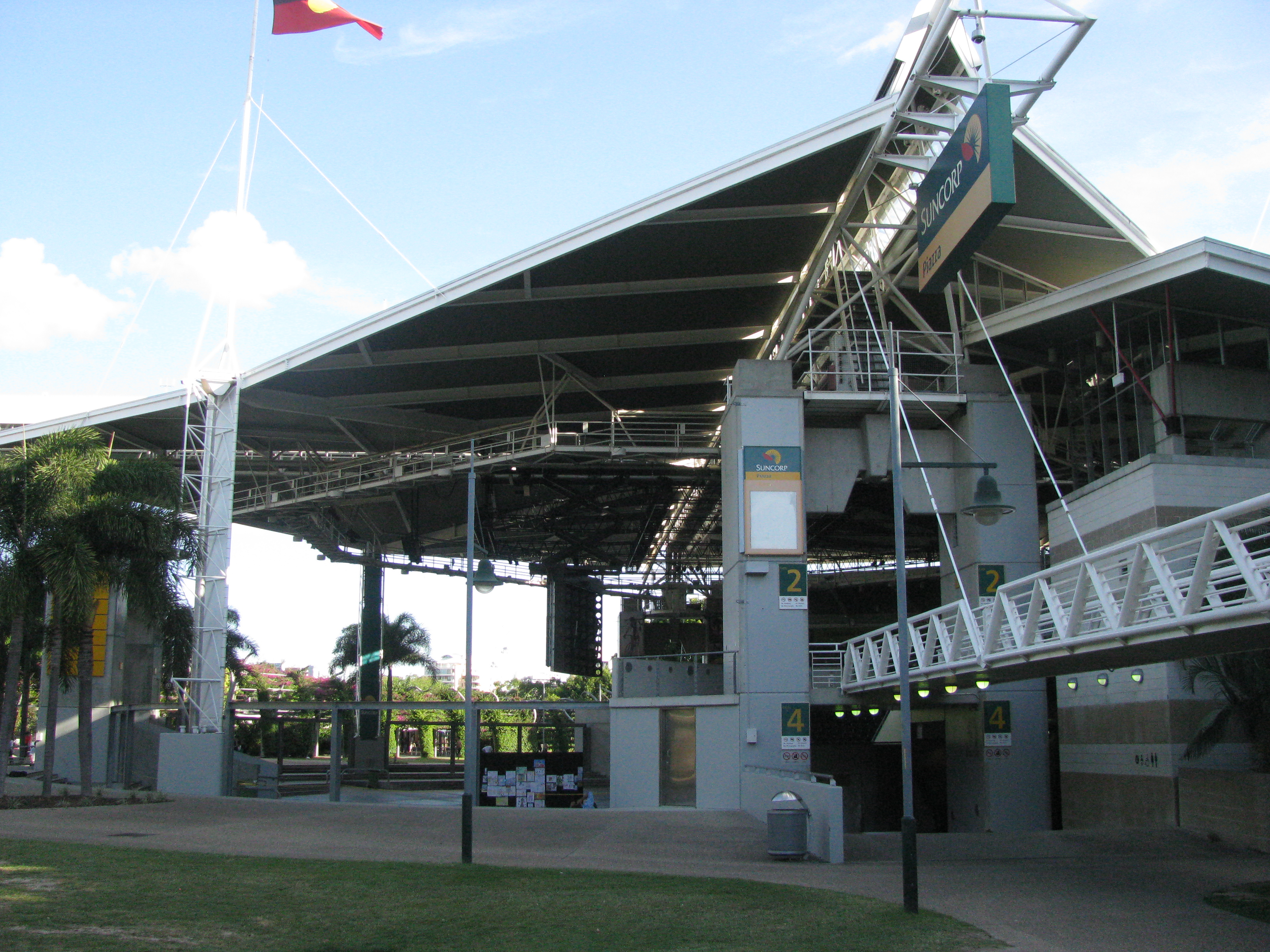
- Northern side of the piazza.
- Interactive map of South Bank Piazza
- Former names: Suncorp Piazza
- Address: South Bank Parklands
- Location: Brisbane, Australia
- Coordinates: 27.477027°S 153.021484°E
- Owner: South Bank Corporation
- Capacity: 2,158

Website
- Official Website

The South Bank Piazza is a multipurpose venue located in the South Bank Parklands in Brisbane, Australia. The Courier-Mail was the naming rights sponsor of the venue from 2013, prior to which it was known as the Suncorp Piazza and is currently known as the South Bank Piazza. The venue is close to the South Brisbane railway station and the Cultural Centre Busway Station.

== Construction ==
The amphitheatre is covered by a sound shell (designed by architectural firm Ark Atelier), and features a 5x4m suspended screen. The amphitheatre seating of the venue has a capacity of 2,158 people, while the floor space (which has an area of 513m^{2}) can accommodate either 750 people standing, or 532 people seated in temporary seating.

== Events ==
In 2022, the Piazza was the location for the opening night of the Brisbane Festival.

The Venue will host the 3x3 Basketball in the 2032 Olympic Games.

== See also ==
- Arts and culture in Brisbane
- Popular entertainment in Brisbane
