= Wheel of Brisbane =

Ferris wheel in Brisbane, Australia

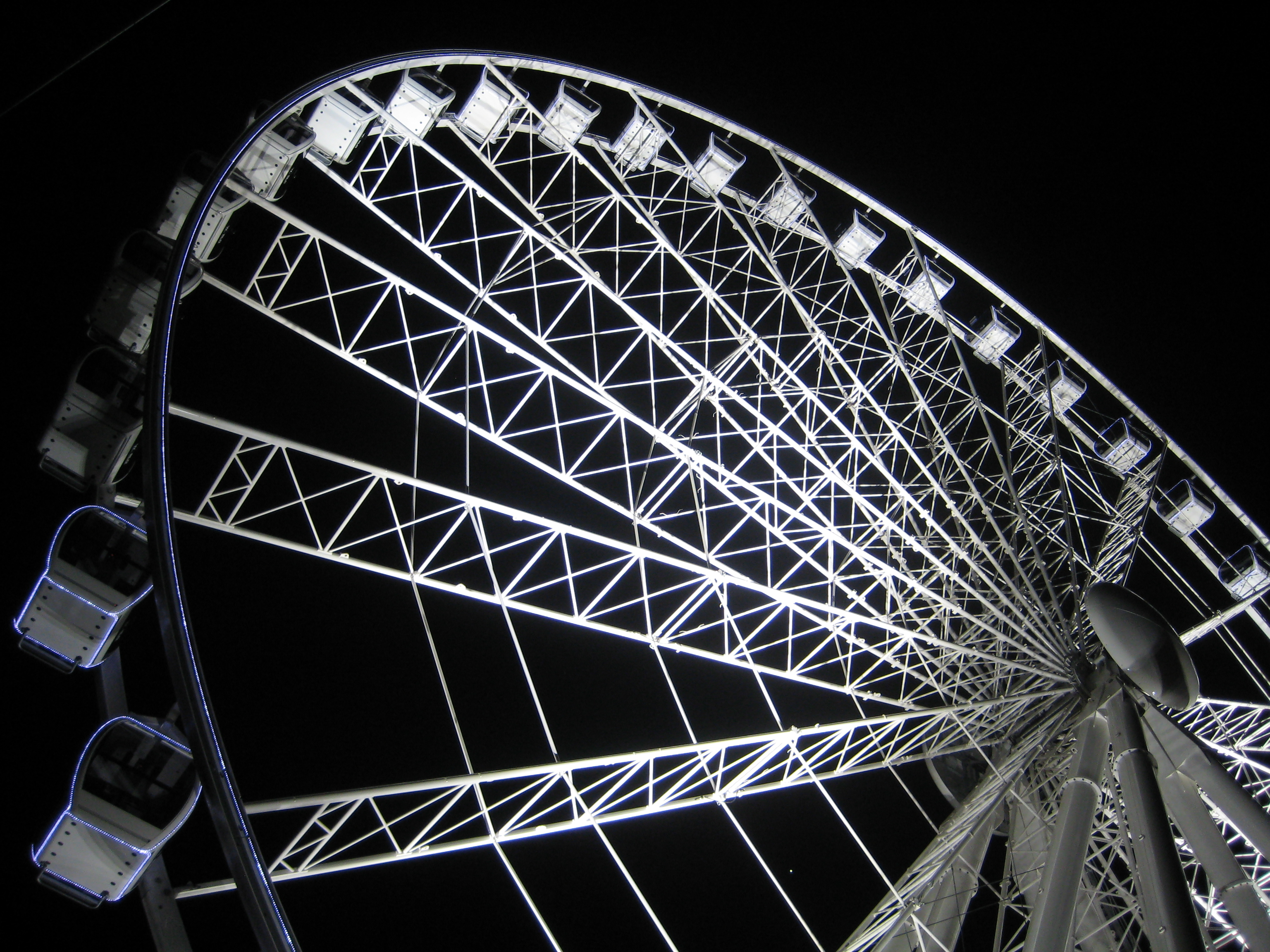
- Wheel of Brisbane

General information
- Type: Ferris wheel
- Location: Brisbane, Queensland, Australia
- Coordinates: 27.4753178°S 153.0208572°E
- Completed: August 2008

Height
- Height: 60 m (197 ft)

The Wheel of Brisbane (commonly known as the Channel Seven Wheel and formerly as the Big Wheel) is an observation wheel in Brisbane, Queensland, Australia. It is 60 metres (197 ft) tall.

It was erected in 2008 at the northern entrance to South Bank Parklands, the transformed World Expo 88 site by the Brisbane River, as part of the 20th anniversary of World Expo 88 and the 150th anniversary of the State of Queensland 1859–2009 celebrations. Its August opening coincided with the annual Riverfire event.

Each of the 42 air-conditioned capsules can seat up to six adults and two children providing a total passenger capacity of 336. The ride lasts for approximately 12 minutes and includes approximately four rotations. It provides 360° panoramic views across the city. It currently features a Seven Network logo on the main axis.

== History ==
The wheel was originally built for Sea World in 2006 as the Sea World Wheel, where it stood in 2006 where it was taken down in late 2007 and moved to South Bank Parklands in August 2008 where it stands to this day.

During the 2011 Brisbane floods, the Wheel was damaged by water.

In May and June 2015, the wheel was partially disassembled as part of its routine maintenance. Each capsule was removed and taken away for an overhaul.
