= List of heritage sites in South Brisbane =

South Brisbane is an inner southern suburb in the City of Brisbane, Queensland, Australia. Being one of the older parts of Brisbane, South Brisbane has many heritage-listed buildings:

- former City Electric Light junction box, outside 39 Annerley Road
- Drinking fountain, outside 39 Annerley Road
- former Tristam's Soft Drink Factory, 79 Boundary Street
- St George's Greek Orthodox Church, 36 Browning Street
- Watson Terrace (terrace house), 45 Browning Street
- former Jolly & Batchelor Premises, 17 Cordelia Street
- former Musgrave Park & South Brisbane Bowls Club, 91 Cordelia Street
- Coorooman (Grange House), 38 Dorchester Street
- Selwyn (manse / house), 40 Dorchester Street
- Ventnor Flats, 15 Edmondstone Street
- Expo 88 Skyneedle (sculpture), 16 Edmondstone Street
- Brighton & Kemptown (duplex house), 19 Edmondstone Street
- Staigersleigh (house / flats), 23 Edmondstone Street
- The Quinta (house), 25 Edmondstone Street
- Zapeoin (house), 37 Edmondstone Street
- Sorrento (terrace house), 43 Edmondstone Street
- St Clement's Melkite Catholic Church & Presbytery, 72 Ernest Street
- Fish Lane (roadway), Fish Lane
- former Park Presbyterian Church, 31 Glenelg Street
- Nechoma Court (flats) 95 Gloucester Street
- William Jolly Bridge, Grey Street
- Queensland Cultural Centre, Grey Street
- former Commonwealth Bank of Australia building, 87 Grey Street
- South Brisbane railway station, 133 Grey Street
- Collins Place (house), 271 Grey Street
- Carmel Court (flats), 3 Hampstead Road
- former Foggitt & Jones Factory, 3 Lanfear Street
- former Catholic Apostolic Church, 16 Manning Street
- former Queensland National Bank, 39 Melbourne Street
- Hotel Terminus, 71 Melbourne Street
- Merivale (flats), 105 Melbourne Street
- Corio (flats), 107 Melbourne Street
- Ariba (house, now offices), 137 Melbourne Street
- Warnilla (house), 139 Melbourne Street
- Tyrian (house), 141 Melbourne Street
- Ambeena & Maroomba (duplex), 143 Melbourne Street
- former Bond's Sweet Factory, 164 Melbourne Street
- former Malouf's Fruit Shop & Residence, 190 Melbourne Street
- St Mary's Catholic Church, 20 Merivale Street
- Brisbane South Girls and Infants School, 88 Merivale Street
- Brisbane State High School, 112 Merivale Street
- former Rosenberg's Hairdressing Salon, 53 Mollison Street
- Coronation Hotel, 46 Montague Road
- Fire hydrant, Outside 61 Montague Road
- Pauls Ice Cream & Milk Office, 62 Montague Road
- former Stewart & Lloyds Factory, 99 Montague Road
- Substation No. 58, 133 Montague Road
- Bulwer Cottage, 4 Norfolk Road
- Ailsa Craig (house), 10 Norfolk Road
- Dockorie (house), 11 Norfolk Road
- Pickwick (house), 12 Norfolk Road
- Suburban house, 13 Norfolk Road
- Wendouree (house), 16 Norfolk Road
- Allgas Building, South Bank Parklands
- Byanda (house), South Bank Parklands
- Nepal Peace Pagoda, South Bank Parklands
- Plough Inn, South Bank Parklands
- Victoria Bridge Abutment, 74 Stanley Street
- South Brisbane Dry Dock, 412 Stanley Street
- South Brisbane Railway Easement, 412 Stanley Street
- South Brisbane Memorial Park, 459 Stanley Street
- former South Brisbane Library, 472 Stanley Street
- former Bank of New South Wales, 496 Stanley Street
- Mater Misericordiae Hospital, 537 Stanley Street
- Shop, 582 Stanley Street
- St Laurence's College, 82 Stephens Road
- Glenwood Cottage, 95 Stephens Road
- Tolarno (house), 118 Vulture Street
- former South Brisbane Primary School, 152 Vulture Street
- St Andrew's Anglican Church, 160 Vulture Street
- pair of worker's cottages, 176 & 178 Vulture Street
- Terrace house, 180 Vulture Street
- Shop, 186 Vulture Street
- San Remo (flats), 240 Vulture Street
- Irving Villas & Clyde Villa (houses), 215 Vulture Street
- former South Brisbane Congregational Church, 245 Vulture Street
- Royal Queensland Society of Blind Citizens Building, 247 Vulture Street
- Cumbooquepa (former house, now school), 253 Vulture Street (Somerville House)
- former South Brisbane Town Hall, 263 Vulture Street
- Ship Inn, 447 Stanley Street

In addition, the Richard Randall Art Studio was originally located in South Brisbane, but it was relocated to the Brisbane Botanic Gardens at Mount Coot-tha in 2007.
