= Coronation Hotel =

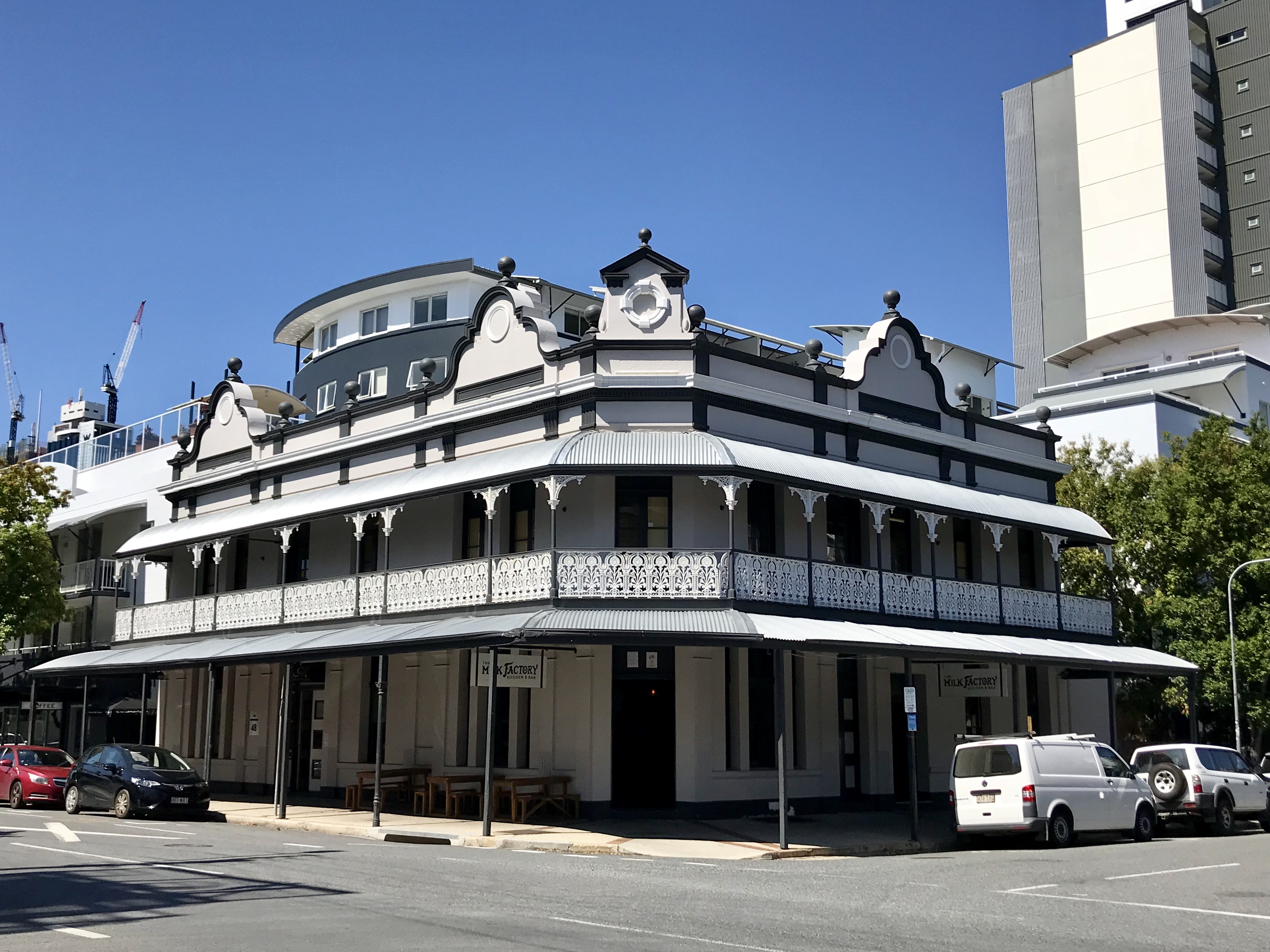
- The hotel in 2018

- Location within Queensland Location within Australia
- 27.4712°S 153.0154°E
- Location: 48 Montague Road, South Brisbane, Queensland, Australia

History
- Design period: 1870s–1890s (late 19th century)
- Built: 1891

Site notes
- Architect: Francis Drummond Greville Stanley

Queensland Heritage Register
- Official name: Coronation Hotel, Montague Hotel
- Type: state heritage (built)
- Designated: 30 April 1993
- Reference no.: 600298
- Significant period: 1891 (fabric); 1891–1987 (historical use as Hotel)
- Significant components: laundry / wash house

Coronation Hotel is a heritage-listed hotel at 46 Montague Road, South Brisbane, Queensland, Australia. It was designed by Francis Drummond Greville Stanley and built in 1891. It is also known as Montague Hotel. It was added to the Queensland Heritage Register on 30 April 1993.

== History ==
The Coronation Hotel was built in 1891 to a design by prominent Brisbane architect Francis Drummond Greville Stanley. It was originally called the Montague Hotel.

At the time of its construction the hotel stood near the heart of the prospering South Brisbane commercial and residential areas. Its first proprietor was George Lotz. In 1953 it was renamed the Coronation Hotel after the coronation of Queen Elizabeth II. From the early 1970s the licensee was rugby league personality Ripper Doyle.

In 1987 the hotel was acquired for redevelopment by neighbouring Queensland United Foods Industries. The redevelopment did not eventuate and it operated as a backpackers hostel during Expo 88 and for some time afterwards. It was unoccupied at the time of its heritage listing in 1993, and housed music venue The Joynt for five years until June 2014. In October 2014, it was reopened as a cocktail bar, The Milk Factory.

== Description ==
The hotel occupies a corner site on Montague Road. It is a two-storeyed rendered and painted brickwork building with a hipped corrugated iron roof. The street facades are surrounded by a cantilevered iron-lace verandah and an awning over the street, with an entrance at the truncated corner.

The ground floor street facades have paired half-fluted pilasters with square motifs above the capitals, and relief moulds which express a base to the building. Timber French doors alternate with timber sash windows which have narrow side lights. The corrugated iron awning extends beyond the edge of the cantilevered balcony above, and is supported by timber posts; two of the original cast iron Corinthian columns remain on the Montague Road frontage.

The first floor has timber French doors and sash windows. The balcony has a cast-iron balustrade, and galvanised sheet iron columns with cast zinc bases and capitals, and a convex corrugated iron awning. The parapet above the awning has a cornice with dentil blocks, a pediment over the corner, and three shaped gables embellished with spheres.

A substantial two-storeyed brick service wing with an intact timber verandah extends off the rear. A gable-roofed laundry stands in the back yard. Next to the service wing is a more recent two-storeyed brick toilet block.

The ground floor interior includes two renovated bars, a dining room which is now partitioned, the kitchen, the store and bathrooms. On the first floor, accessed by a fine timber staircase, are a number of bedrooms and bathrooms. With the exception of the bars and bathrooms, the interior is largely intact. The walls are lined with plaster, and fretwork fanlights remain above the doors. In the bedrooms, the tongue and groove timber ceilings have metal rose vents.

Although the building requires repairs, it is substantially intact, in particularly the exterior, which is a fine example of the architect's skill.

== Heritage listing ==
Coronation Hotel was listed on the Queensland Heritage Register on 30 April 1993 having satisfied the following criteria.

The place is important in demonstrating the evolution or pattern of Queensland's history.

The Coronation Hotel is significant as it has a special association with architect FDG Stanley as an example of his work.

The place demonstrates rare, uncommon or endangered aspects of Queensland's cultural heritage.

The Coronation Hotel is significant as an intact remnant of an early streetscape of a residential scale which is now rare and endangered.

The place is important in demonstrating the principal characteristics of a particular class of cultural places.

The hotel demonstrates the principal characteristics of an 1890s hotel.

The place is important because of its aesthetic significance.

The Coronation Hotel is important in exhibiting aesthetic characteristics valued by the community in its fine design.
