= Collins Place, South Brisbane =

Collins Place
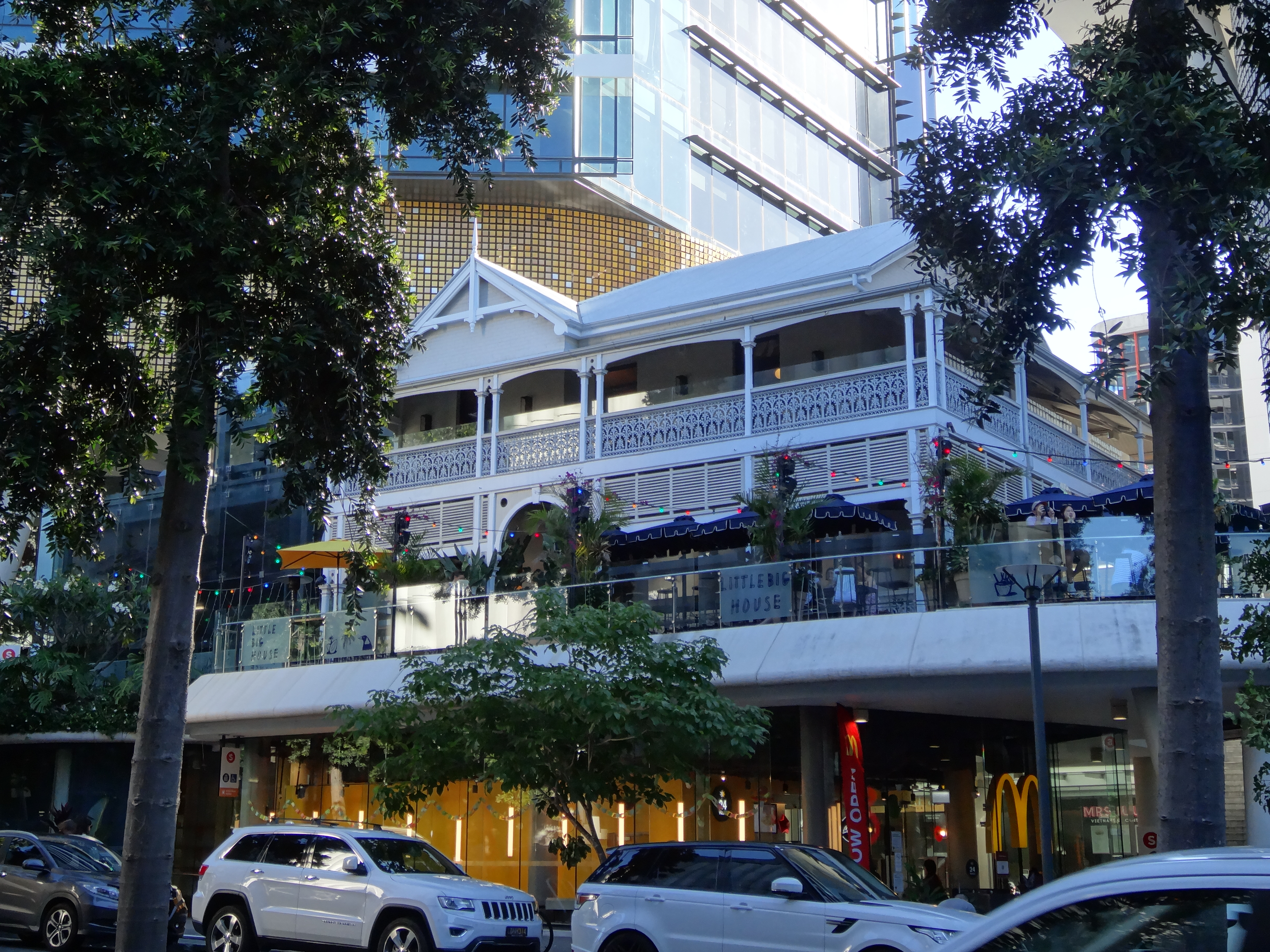
- Collins Place in 2021

- Location within Queensland Location within Australia
- 27.4817°S 153.0233°E
- Location: 271 Grey Street, South Brisbane, Queensland, Australia

History
- Design period: 1870s–1890s (late 19th century)
- Built: c. 1889

Queensland Heritage Register
- Official name: Collins Place, Greyscourt, Byanda
- Type: state heritage (built)
- Designated: 21 October 1992
- Reference no.: 600296
- Significant period: 1880s/1890s (fabric, historical)
- Significant components: basement / sub-floor, residential accommodation – main house, service wing, wall/s – retaining

Collins Place is a heritage-listed detached house at 271 Grey Street, South Brisbane, Queensland, Australia. It was built c. 1889. It is also known as Greyscourt and Byanda. It was added to the Queensland Heritage Register on 21 October 1992.

== History ==
Collins Place was constructed in 1889 or 1890 for Ship Inn proprietor Michael Foley, on land he acquired in 1887. Around the same time Foley also built the neighbouring semi-detached houses of Greyscourt and Beth Eden, which later became known conjointly as Grays Court. Foley's houses were erected during the boom which transformed Grey Street, South Brisbane's principal residential street since the mid 1840s, into a fashionable address.

From 1890 until the early 1910s it was occupied by respected Brisbane surgeon Francis Glynn Connolly who called the house Byanda.

It passed from the Foley family in 1928, but remained a rental property through subsequent ownerships.

Lynette Bloss, who purchased the property in 1983 and renovated the building, unsuccessfully appealed against its resumption by the Expo Authority in 1984. Ms Bloss bestowed the name Collins Place to commemorate 1857 deed of grant holder, squatter John Collins.

During Expo '88 the building functioned as Collins Place Spaghetti House. At the time of the building's heritage listing in 1992, it was in use as a police station.

The precinct around Collins Place was redeveloped in 2013–14 with a major residential, commercial and hotel development named "Southpoint" being built around the historic building. Collins Place has been retained as a focal point for the development, and will house a restaurant or tavern when complete. However, the redevelopment of the site involved raising the 330 metric tons (320 long tons; 360 short tons) property by nine metres which occurred in December 2014.

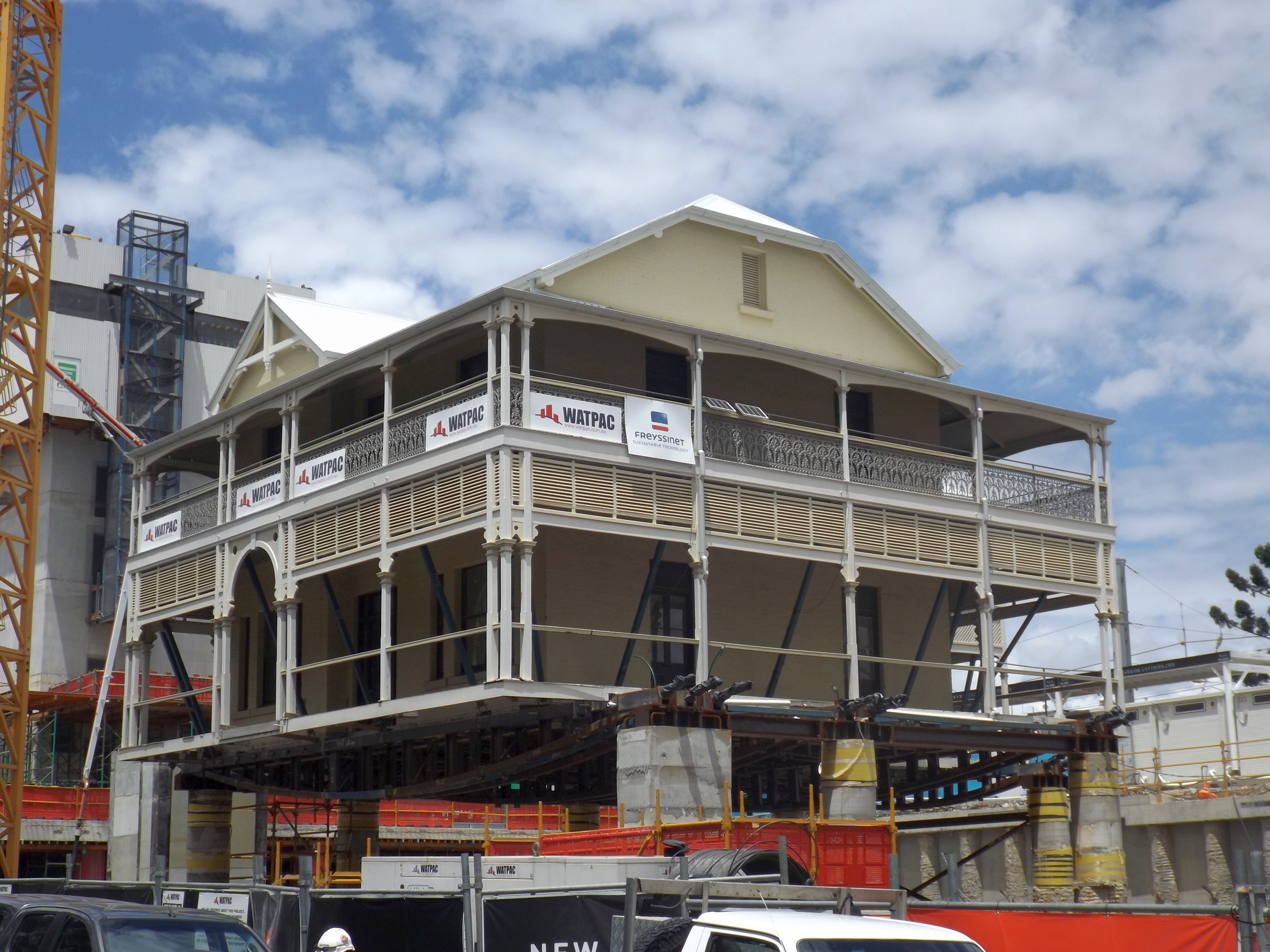
Collins Place being raised during 2015

== Description ==
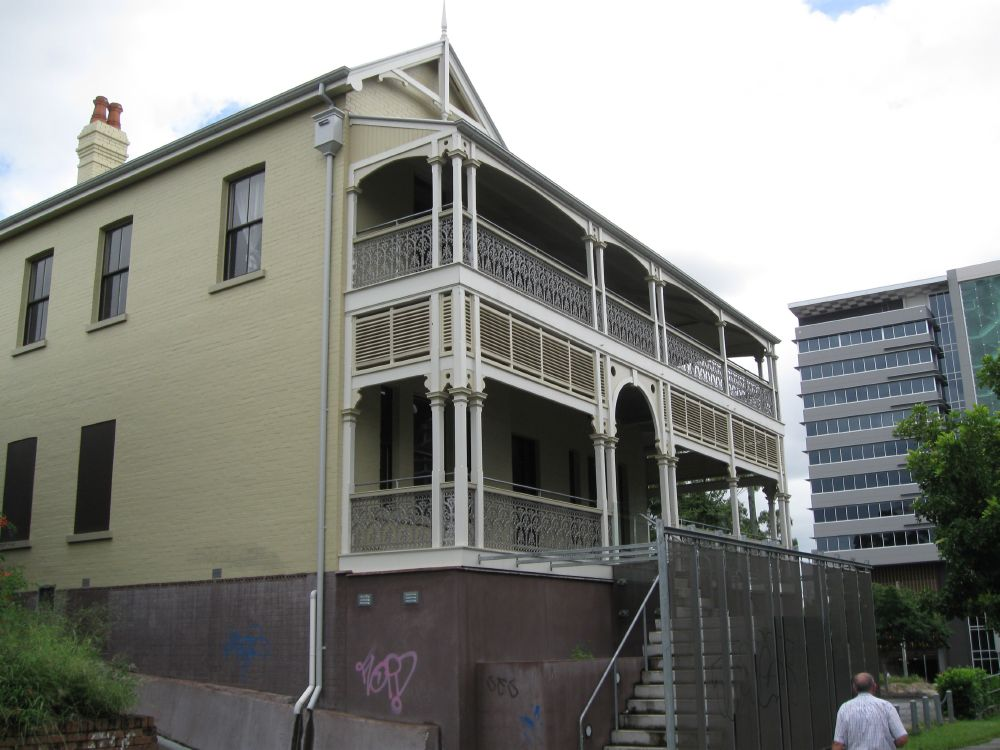
Collins Place, 2009

Collins Place is a two-and-a-half storeyed rendered brick building with pitched corrugated iron roofs situated on a slope which falls away from the adjacent Southbank railway station (formerly Vulture Street railway station). Fronting Grey Street at its south-eastern end, Collins Place currently stands without immediate neighbours on either side.

The building is L-shaped, with a service wing to the rear, and has verandahs on three sides to two levels. It has a hipped roof linking to a gabled roof running over the service wing. The street-facing gable projects and is decorated with a finial and cross pieces. Chimneys with double clay pots rise above the roof line. The verandah has a skillion roof.

Externally-exposed walls have been painted, while those sheltered by the verandah are unpainted, and show light-coloured splayed brick lintels, stone sills, and darker face brickwork. The building has timber sash windows, French doors opening onto the second level verandahs, tripartite windows facing the street to the first floor level, and flat arches to window heads on second floor level. It sits on a rendered masonry base which has intricate brick and iron ventilators.

The verandahs are supported on timber columns with bevelled corners and square capitals, and have cast-iron valances and balustrading. Louvred timber spandrels run beneath the first floor verandah.

Internally, the building comprises rooms either side of a central corridor and stairs, with the two-storeyed service wing being accessed from the rear. It is entered from street level via timber stairs which arrive at the first floor verandah; there are also timber service stairs to the rear. The house retains some earlier detailing, including pressed metal ceilings on the first floor, timber stairs with a richly detailed balustrade and timber panelling, and deep cedar skirtings and reveals.

Collins Place retains the form, some of the internal and much of the external picturesque detailing of a turn of the century townhouse. In its new context it is a fragment of a former streetscape.

== Heritage listing ==
Collins Place was listed on the Queensland Heritage Register on 21 October 1992 having satisfied the following criteria.

The place is important in demonstrating the evolution or pattern of Queensland's history.

It is the only surviving house in what was formerly one of South Brisbane's earliest residential streets, and is remnant evidence of the 1880s transformation of Grey Street into a fashionable address.

The place is important in demonstrating the principal characteristics of a particular class of cultural places.

An example of a late 19th century brick townhouse in Brisbane, it also retains its picturesque detailing.

The place is important because of its aesthetic significance.

An example of a late 19th century brick townhouse in Brisbane, it also retains its picturesque detailing.
