= Stefan Ackerie =

Australian businessman

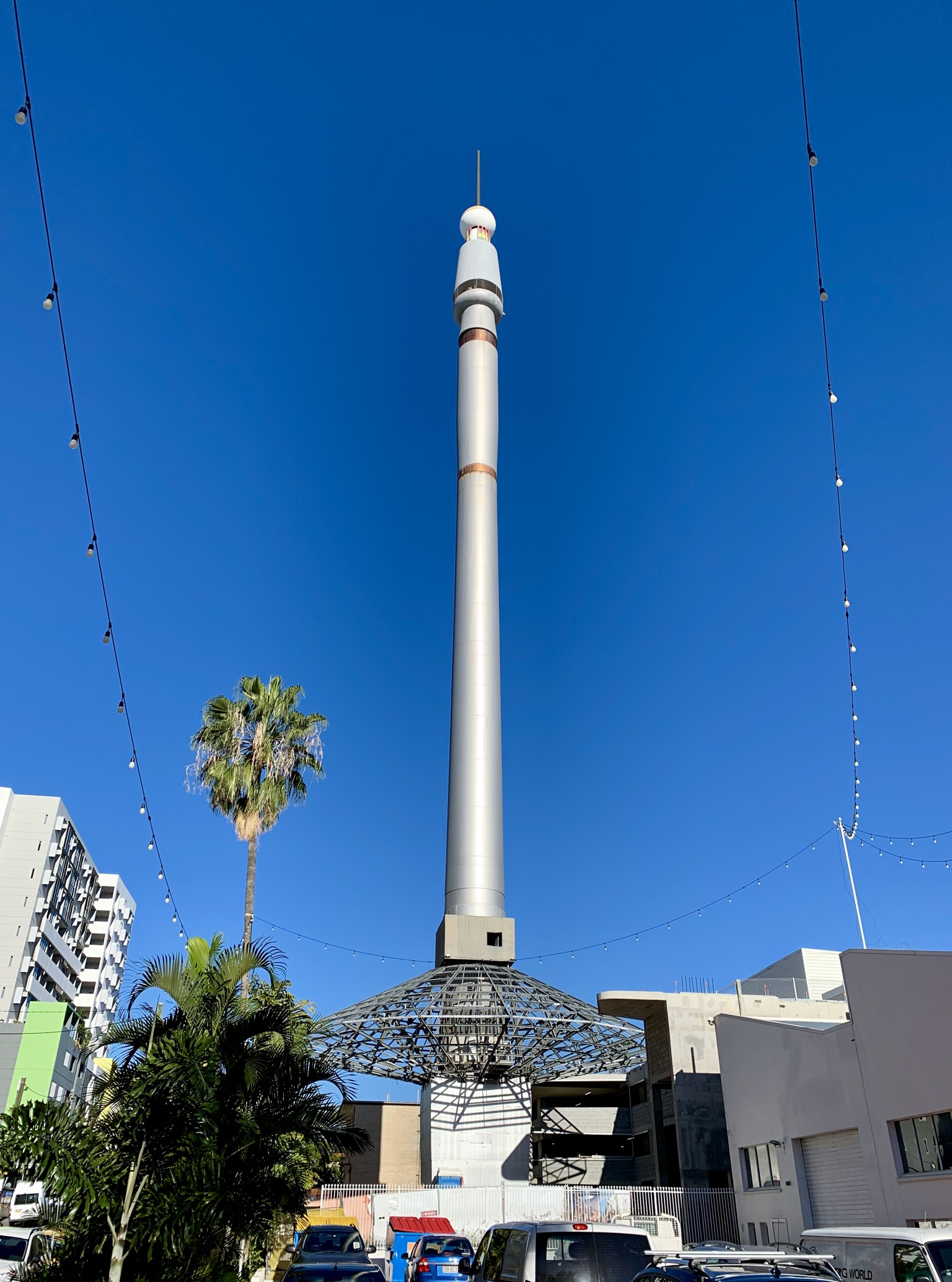
The Skyneedle, over Stefan's headquarters, June 2019

Stefan Ackerie AM (born 1941), usually known by the mononym Stefan, is a hairdresser and powerboat racer who owns a chain of salons throughout Queensland, Australia.

== Early life ==
He was born in 1941 in Batroun, Lebanon. His family migrated when he was 15 to Adelaide, South Australia, where he trained as a hairdresser and learned to speak English at nightschool.

== Career ==
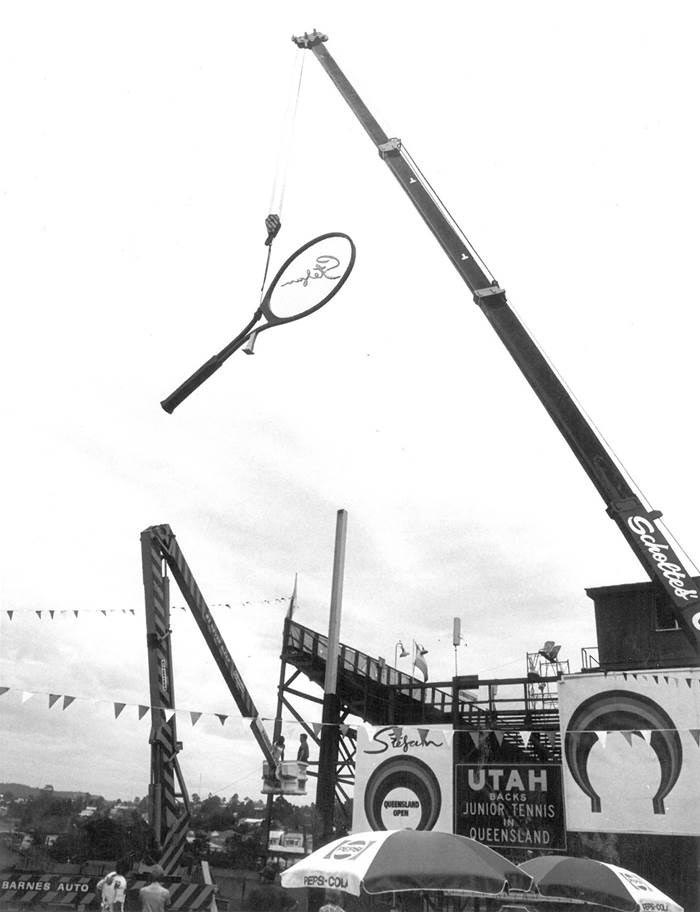
The Stefan Racquet being removed from Milton Courts, circa 1999

He owns a chain of approximately 50 hairdressing salons throughout Queensland and New South Wales. He previously owned a Brisbane restaurant Jo Jo's, which opened above the Queen Street Mall in the 1970s and became widely considered an important social establishment. In 2019, it relocated to Melbourne Street, South Brisbane, before closing down. He also previously owned Stefan's Boating World in Coomera on the Gold Coast, Queensland.

Stefan's Brisbane headquarters was previously located in South Brisbane, underneath the Skyneedle, a landmark which Stefan saved from being moved overseas after World Expo '88. When the Milton Tennis Centre was demolished circa 1999, Stefan rescued the 7-metre (23 ft) tennis racquet icon (based on the Aldila brand) erected there (he had sponsored the Queensland Tennis Open competition at that site). In June 2014, it was re-erected over the Frew Park tennis facility, which replaced the Milton Tennis Centre.

=== Awards ===
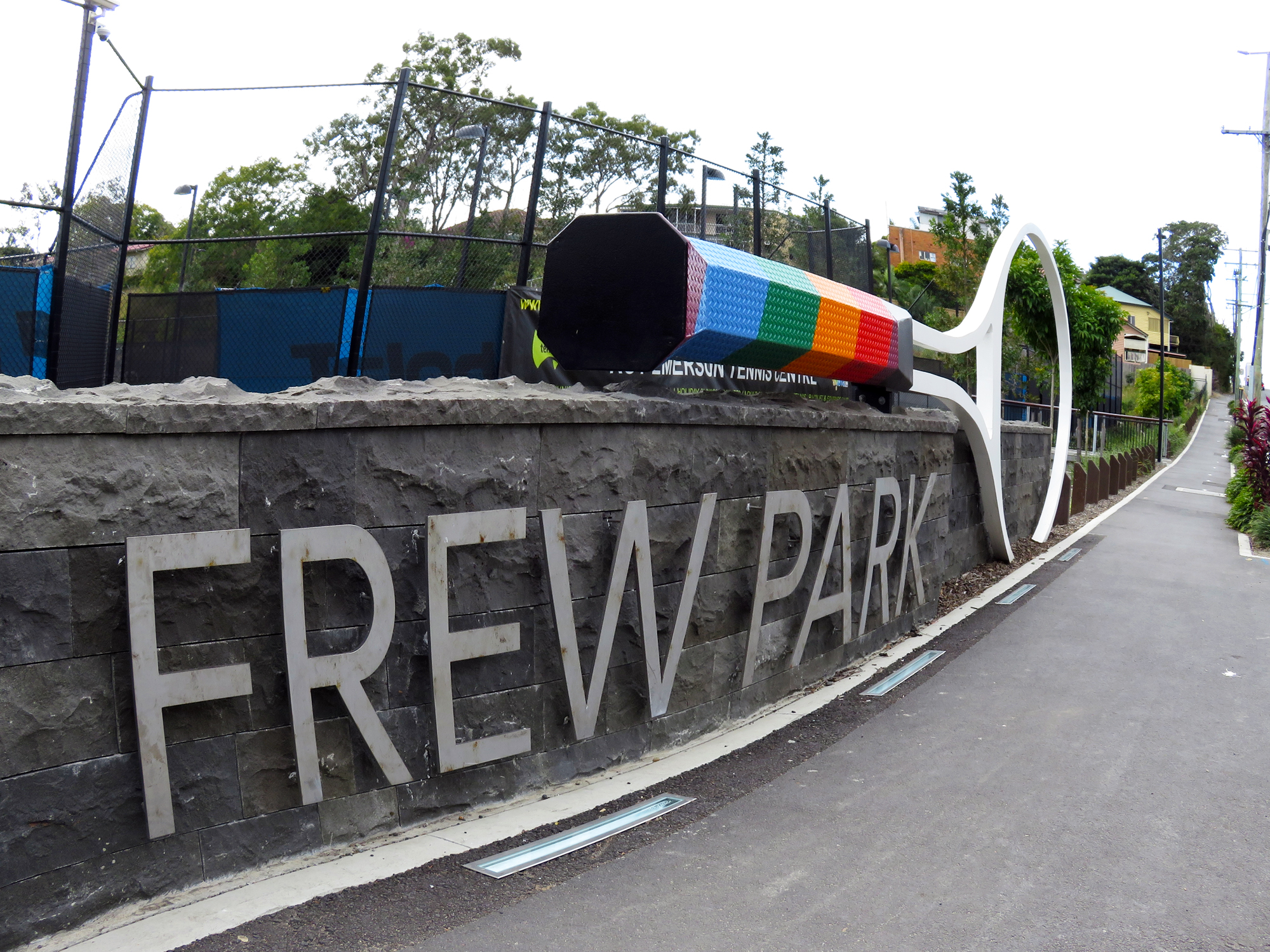
The Stefan Racquet restored to Frew Park, circa 2014

Stefan was a finalist in the 2004 Australian of the Year awards. He is also a keen power boat racer and holds multiple records, including fastest crossing of Bass Strait and the fastest crossing of the Straits of Malacca.

In 2013, Stefan was presented a Queensland Greats Award from the Queensland Government.

In 2024, Stefan was inducted into the Queensland Business Leaders Hall of Fame in recognition of 'sustained entrepreneurship in developing an iconic Queensland business for 60 years'.
