= Allgas Building =

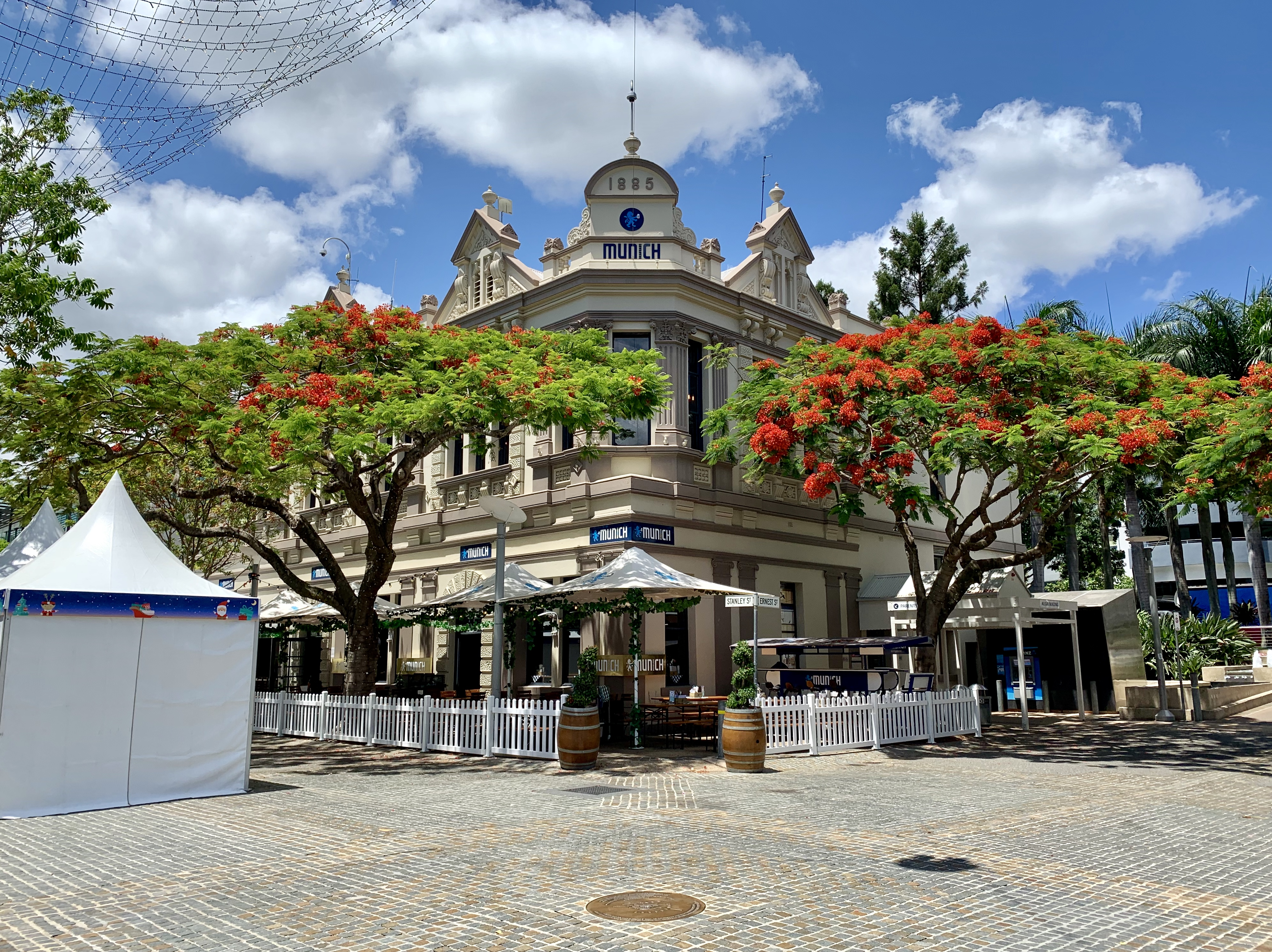
- Allgas Building, 2018

- Location within Queensland Location within Australia
- 27.4789°S 153.0229°E
- Location: South Bank Parklands, South Brisbane, City of Brisbane, Queensland, Australia

History
- Design period: 1870s–1890s (late 19th century)
- Built: 1885

Queensland Heritage Register
- Official name: Allgas Building, Caledonian House, Queensland National Bank, South Brisbane Gas & Light Co. Building
- Type: state heritage (built)
- Designated: 21 October 1992
- Reference no.: 600295
- Significant period: 1885–1942 (fabric); 1885–1893 (Allan and Stark); 1897–1965 (QNB); 1897–1984 (South Brisbane Gas & Light Co. Building)

Allgas Building is a heritage-listed commercial building at South Bank Parklands, South Brisbane, City of Brisbane, Queensland, Australia. It was built in 1885. It is also known as Caledonian House, Queensland National Bank, South Brisbane Gas & Light Co. Building and All Gas House. It was added to the Queensland Heritage Register on 21 October 1992.

== History ==
The Allgas Building, a two-storeyed building in what was formerly central Stanley Street, was erected in 1885 for the drapery and outfitting firm of Allan & Stark. It was built during the peak of South Brisbane commercial development and the reconstruction of Stanley Street premises, and was a reflection of boom era confidence.

Along with a number of prominent South Brisbane firms, Allan & Stark moved across the river to higher ground (the Allan and Stark Building in Queen Street) after the disastrous floods of 1893. Caledonian House was leased to the Queensland National Bank as a branch office (301 Stanley Street) in August 1897, and the South Brisbane Gas & Light Company sub-leased a section (305 Stanley Street) from October 1897.

In 1909 the Queensland National Bank purchased the building for £2,500, with the South Brisbane Gas & Light Company maintaining its office and showroom there.

Alterations, including changes to the street frontage, were carried out in 1931 under architects Hall and Phillips, and included the erection of an awning and alterations to the shop front. The building was again extended in 1942.

In 1943 the branch was closed as a war time economy, and 301 Stanley Street was leased to shirt and pyjama manufacturer Alfred Portrate until 1949.

The corner premises were reoccupied by maintenance staff of the National Bank of Australasia (formerly the Queensland National Bank) in 1949. In 1965 it was purchased by the South Brisbane Gas & Light Company (Allgas Energy from 1971).

In 1984 the building was resumed by the Expo Authority, renamed Central House, and functioned once again as a bank during World Expo '88. It also housed the Picasso Restaurant.

The building was again refurbished in 1991 as part of the Southbank Parklands redevelopment, and now operates as an administration centre.

Little remains of the original interior of the building. Externally, the northern facade remains intact above ground floor; the ground floor facade has been modified a number of times throughout the life of the building. New openings have been made to other facades.

== Description ==
The Allgas building is a two-storeyed rendered masonry building with a parapeted facade and a simple rectangular plan. It has a picturesque front facade which is a remnant of a former streetscape.

The northern facade above the ground floor and its western corner is richly decorated. It has a deep string course separating ground and first floors, and a deep cornice topped by pediments and a miniature balustrade. The elevation has bays of three windows with rusticated surrounds, which align with the pediments and console brackets under the cornice. Paired windows are flanked with fluted pilasters with floriated capitals. At what was once the western street corner, the facade is truncated above ground floor level, and is topped with an arched pediment inscribed with the date 1885.

Whilst little remains of the original building internally, the Allgas Building retains its overall external form and the rich decorative detailing of the northern facade.

== Heritage listing ==
Allgas Building was listed on the Queensland Heritage Register on 21 October 1992 having satisfied the following criteria.

The place is important in demonstrating the evolution or pattern of Queensland's history.

The picturesque front facade in particular, along with the nearby Plough Inn facade, survives as a fragment of the former streetscape of Stanley Street, South Brisbane's principal commercial thoroughfare in the late 19th century. It is also significant historically as a rare surviving remnant of the commercial and shipping heart of South Brisbane in the late 19th century.

The place demonstrates rare, uncommon or endangered aspects of Queensland's cultural heritage.

It is also significant historically as a rare surviving remnant of the commercial and shipping heart of South Brisbane in the late 19th century.

The place is important because of its aesthetic significance.

The picturesque front facade in particular, along with the nearby Plough Inn facade, survives as a fragment of the former streetscape of Stanley Street, South Brisbane's principal commercial thoroughfare in the late 19th century.

The place has a special association with the life or work of a particular person, group or organisation of importance in Queensland's history.

The Allgas Building at South Brisbane has a strong association with the early years of Allan & Stark, formerly one of Brisbane's most prominent retailing firms.
