= Plough Inn, Brisbane =

Plough Inn
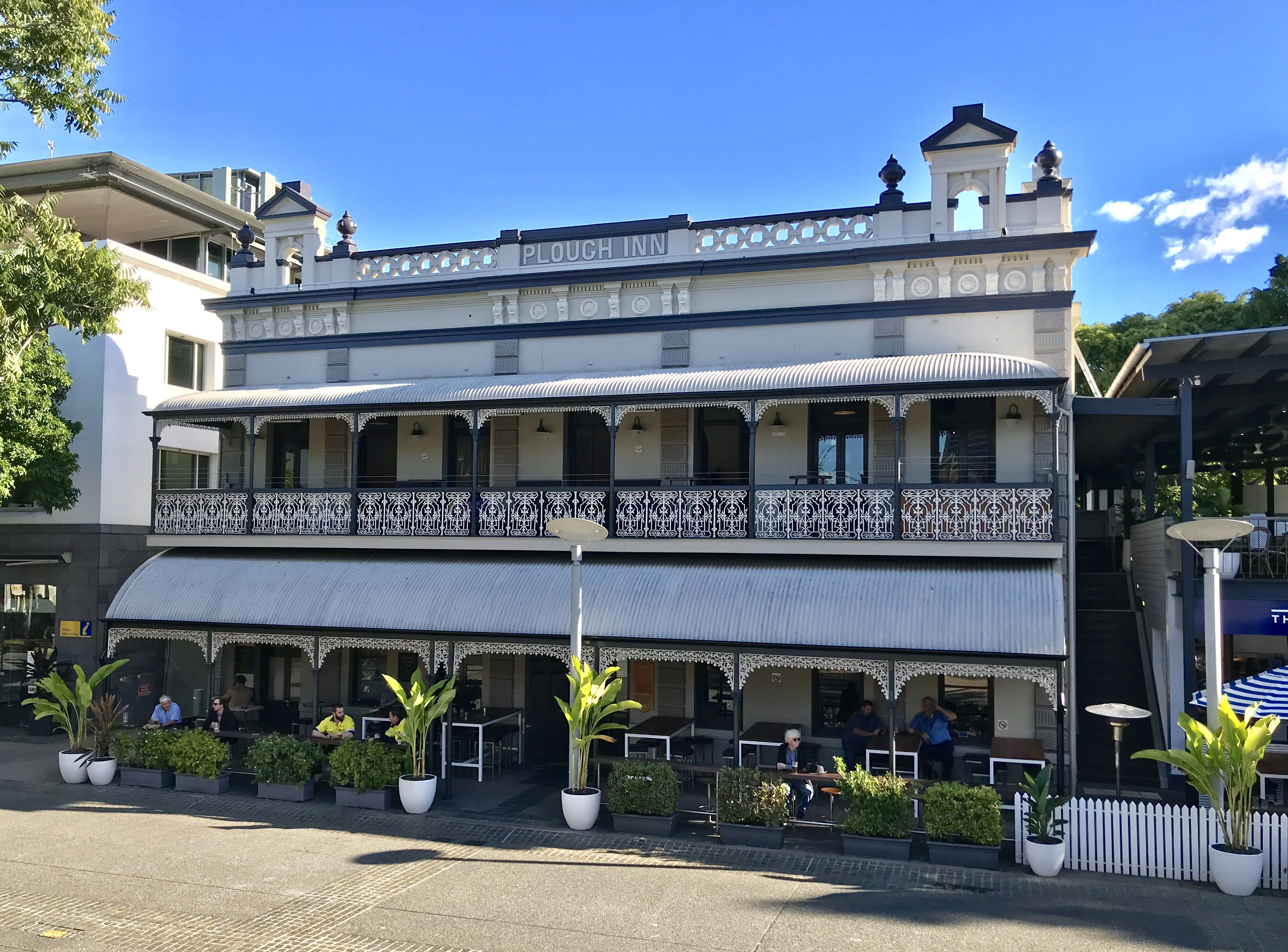
- Plough Inn, 2018

- Location within Queensland Location within Australia
- 27.4783°S 153.0225°E
- Location: South Bank Parklands, South Brisbane, City of Brisbane, Queensland, Australia

History
- Design period: 1870s–1890s (late 19th century)
- Built: 1885, extended 1922
- Built for: Daniel Costigan

Site notes
- Architect(s): Alexander Brown Wilson (1885), George Henry Male Addison and Son (1922)

Queensland Heritage Register
- Official name: Plough Inn, Plough Inn Hotel
- Type: state heritage (built)
- Designated: 21 October 1992
- Reference no.: 600294
- Significant period: 1885–1922 (fabric); 1885–ongoing (historical, use as hotel); 1987 (historical), Expo 88 modifications
- Significant components: kitchen/kitchen house
- Builders: Abraham James (1885), Robertson and Corbette (1922)

Plough Inn is a heritage-listed hotel at South Bank Parklands, South Brisbane, City of Brisbane, Queensland, Australia. It was designed by Alexander Brown Wilson and built in 1885 by contractor Abraham James. In 1922, it was extended to a design by George Henry Male Addison and Son and built by Robertson and Corbette. It is also known as Plough Inn Hotel. It was added to the Queensland Heritage Register on 21 October 1992.

== History ==
This two-storeyed former hotel was constructed in 1885 for Brisbane publican Daniel Costigan. It replaced a previous, less substantial structure on the site, which had functioned as the Plough Inn since 1864. The new building was erected during South Brisbane's heyday and was part of the 1880s boom-time reconstruction of Stanley Street premises.

The building was designed by architect Alexander Brown Wilson, who is more known for his domestic work. It was built by contractor Abraham James, whose tender of £3,300 was accepted in March 1885.

The hotel, prominently located in central Stanley Street, serviced the commercial heart of South Brisbane. Its proximity to the South Brisbane wharves ensured its popularity amongst those engaged in shipping interests.

Initially the L-shaped interior comprised on the ground floor: a central hall, staircase, dining room, two private rooms (probably for dining also), bar, parlour, storage spaces, billiard room and lavatories; the first floor contained fourteen guest rooms and a bathroom. A verandah along the back of the building connected it to a detached single-storey kitchen. A cellar completed the facilities.

The building has been altered a number of times since its initial construction. In 1922, additions were made by contractors Robertson and Corbette, following the designs of George Henry Male Addison and Son. It is thought that the street awning was added at this time.

In 1987 the building was modified to function as a tavern during Expo '88. Most of the internal walls were removed, the central fireplace and chimney were taken out, and the interior was re-fitted. Also the front verandah was widened, the rear verandah extended, and windows and doors replaced at this time.

In 1991–92 a conservation plan for the Plough Inn was prepared by Bruce Buchanan architects, and the interior was fully refurbished. The front verandah was also reconstructed.

The Plough Inn now operates as a Southbank hotel.

== Description ==
The Plough Inn is a two-storeyed rendered masonry building with front and rear verandahs, and a single-storeyed service building to the rear. It has a picturesque front facade which is a remnant of a former streetscape.

The hotel has an L-shaped plan; the rectangular service building is attached via the rear verandah.

The front facade is richly detailed, while other elevations are more perfunctory. The front facade has three bays, expressed with rusticated pilasters and parapet decoration comprising pediments either end and a central name plaque. The pediments are flanked by acroteria, and the plaque is inscribed with the words PLOUGH INN. The pediments and plaques are connected by a miniature balustrade, and rest on a deep cornice with dentils, separated by another band of decoration from a second cornice.

Whilst little remains of the original hotel internally, the Plough Inn retains its external envelope and overall form.

== Heritage listing ==
Plough Inn was listed on the Queensland Heritage Register on 21 October 1992 having satisfied the following criteria.

The place is important in demonstrating the evolution or pattern of Queensland's history.

The picturesque front facade in particular, along with the nearby Allgas Building facade, survives as a fragment of the former streetscape of Stanley Street, South Brisbane's principal commercial thoroughfare in the late 19th century.

The place demonstrates rare, uncommon or endangered aspects of Queensland's cultural heritage.

Plough Inn is significant historically as a rare surviving remnant of the commercial and shipping heart of South Brisbane in the late 19th century.

The place is important because of its aesthetic significance.

The picturesque front facade in particular, along with the nearby Allgas Building facade, survives as a fragment of the former streetscape of Stanley Street, South Brisbane's principal commercial thoroughfare in the late 19th century.

The place has a special association with the life or work of a particular person, group or organisation of importance in Queensland's history.

The place has a strong association with the work of prominent Brisbane architect Alexander Brown Wilson.

== Hauntings ==
Paranormal investigator Joe Nickell researched reported stories about a ghost at the inn, the stories claim that a young woman or girl haunts near or in room 7. No one reported seeing the ghost, only hearing her wander the halls. Nickell explains that the stories vary which is a sign of folklore. Different versions of the same story, retold person to person, copying and adding changes for "literary purposes".
