= Coorooman =

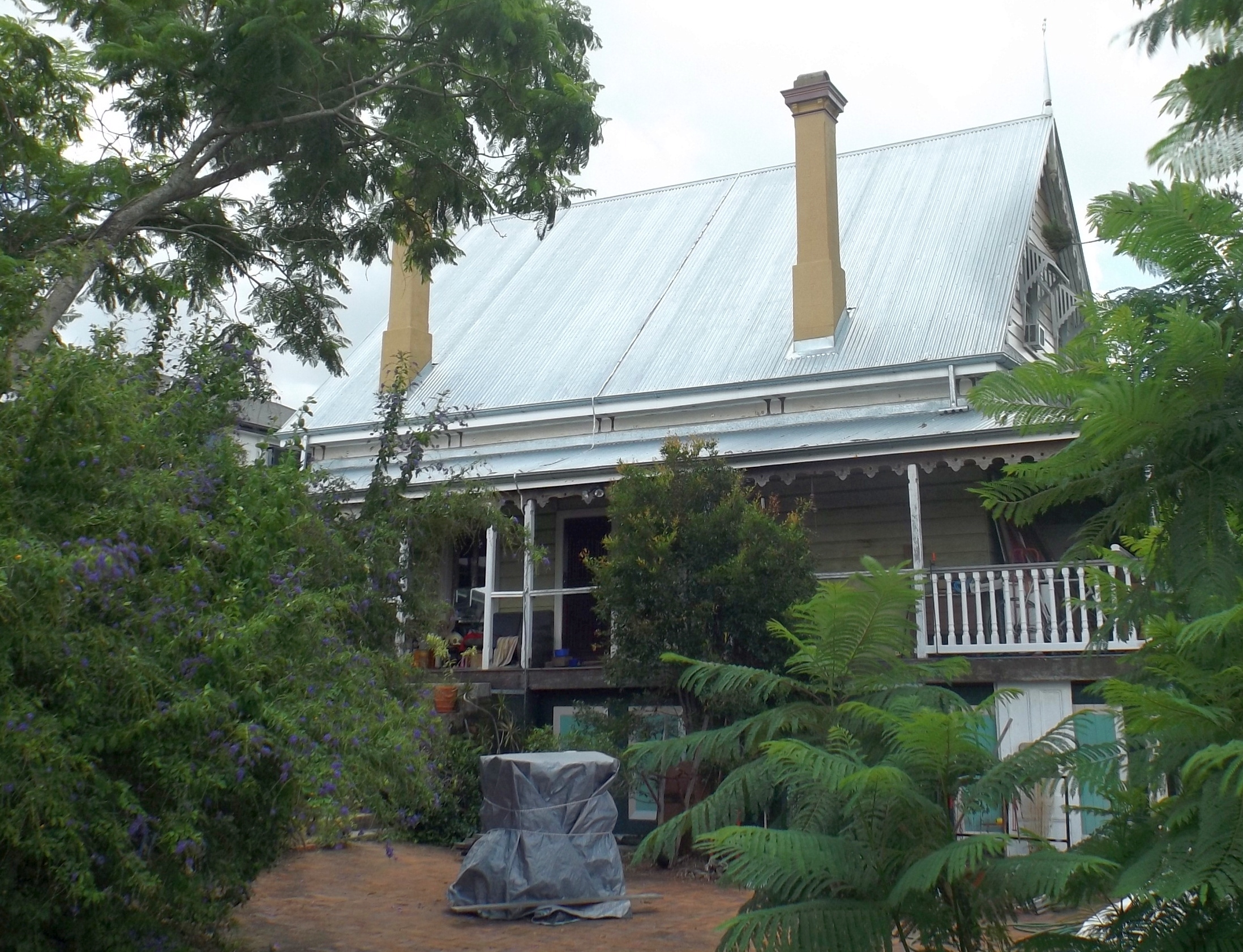
- Residence in 2015

- Location within Queensland Location within Australia
- 27.4831°S 153.0219°E
- Location: 38 Dorchester Street, South Brisbane, City of Brisbane, Queensland, Australia

History
- Design period: 1840s–1860s (mid-19th century)
- Built: 1860s

Queensland Heritage Register
- Official name: Coorooman, The Grange
- Type: state heritage (built, landscape)
- Designated: 21 October 1992
- Reference no.: 600224
- Significant period: 1860s (fabric, history)
- Significant components: fence/wall – dividing, service wing, attic, trees/plantings, residential accommodation – main house, basement / sub-floor, fence/wall – perimeter

Coorooman is a heritage-listed detached house at 38 Dorchester Street, South Brisbane, City of Brisbane, Queensland, Australia. It was built in the 1860s. It is also known as The Grange. It was added to the Queensland Heritage Register on 21 October 1992.

== History ==
Coorooman, a single-storeyed timber residence with attic and basement, was constructed by c. 1882, when it was known as Grange House. Materials and stylistic details suggest it was erected much earlier, probably in the 1860s.

Portion 147, a 9-acre parcel which included the Grange House site, was alienated in 1856 by Thomas Blacket Stephens. Portion 147 was part of approximately 125 acres (51 ha) – most of the land between what is now Stephen's Road and Gladstone Road, and from Vulture Street to Gloucester Street – alienated by TB Stephens at this period. Stephens erected the first Cumbooquepa (Somerville House) on this land, and may have erected Grange House as well, which would account for its northern orientation to Vulture Street.

Stephens subdivided portion 147 about 1863, and title to the Grange House site of 24.8 perches (630 m^{2}) (subdivisions 16 and 17), fronting the newly created Water Street West to the south and overlooking the Brisbane River to the north, was transferred to Helen Bell and her sister Ann Paton Love, in April 1863. The Love family retained title to this property until the late 1870s, but do not appear to have lived there.

In 1882 title passed to Janet Burns, and she and her husband John were resident at Grange House by the following year. He was a merchant in business with his brother, James, who established the trading and mercantile firm of Burns, Philp & Co. Ltd in 1883. John Burns died in 1884, but Grange House remained the property of the Burns family until 1912, during which time it was mostly rented to middle class tenants.

Lionel Clive Ball acquired the property in 1912, and renamed the house Coorooman. Ball became chief government geologist in 1931 and pioneered the geological mapping of Queensland based on aerial photography. The Ball family held the property until 1956.

Coorooman remains a substantially intact, mid-19th century residence.

== Description ==
Coorooman is a substantial timber residence situated on a ridge at South Brisbane overlooking the Brisbane River. The house is oriented to the north and Vulture Street, but from at least 1865, the site has been accessed from Dorchester Street to the south.

The core is rectangular in form, with an encircling verandah, a highly pitched gabled-roof (originally shingled but now clad with corrugated iron), attic rooms and a brick basement. Parts of the verandah have been enclosed. Decorative elements include scalloped barge boards, turned finials with twisted lightning conductors, distinctive arched dormer windows, turned cedar verandah balusters and two classically moulded chimney heads. Internally, much of the original cedar joinery survives.

There are four rooms on the main floor and another four rooms in the attic. These are lit by windows in the dormers and in the gable ends. The brick foundations contain two large basement rooms, one of which was used as LC Ball's photographic darkroom.

To the southeast of the main building is a formerly detached timber wing containing kitchen and staff quarters.

The grounds contain part of an early slab fence, and plantings include a Norfolk Island pine thought to date to c. 1930.

== Heritage listing ==
Coorooman was listed on the Queensland Heritage Register on 21 October 1992 having satisfied the following criteria.

The place is important in demonstrating the evolution or pattern of Queensland's history.

Coorooman, erected by c. 1882, is significant historically for its association with the mid-19th century expansion of middle-class residential settlement on the ridges of South Brisbane, overlooking the Brisbane River.

The place is important in demonstrating the principal characteristics of a particular class of cultural places.

It remains substantially intact, and is an important example of an early gothic-style house in Brisbane.

The place is important because of its aesthetic significance.

Coorooman occupies a prominent position, and is important as one of Brisbane's commanding hilltop houses which contributes significantly to the townscape of South Brisbane.
