= The Skyneedle, Brisbane =

Landmark tower in Brisbane, Australia

Coordinates: 27°28′37.34″S 153°00′54.00″E

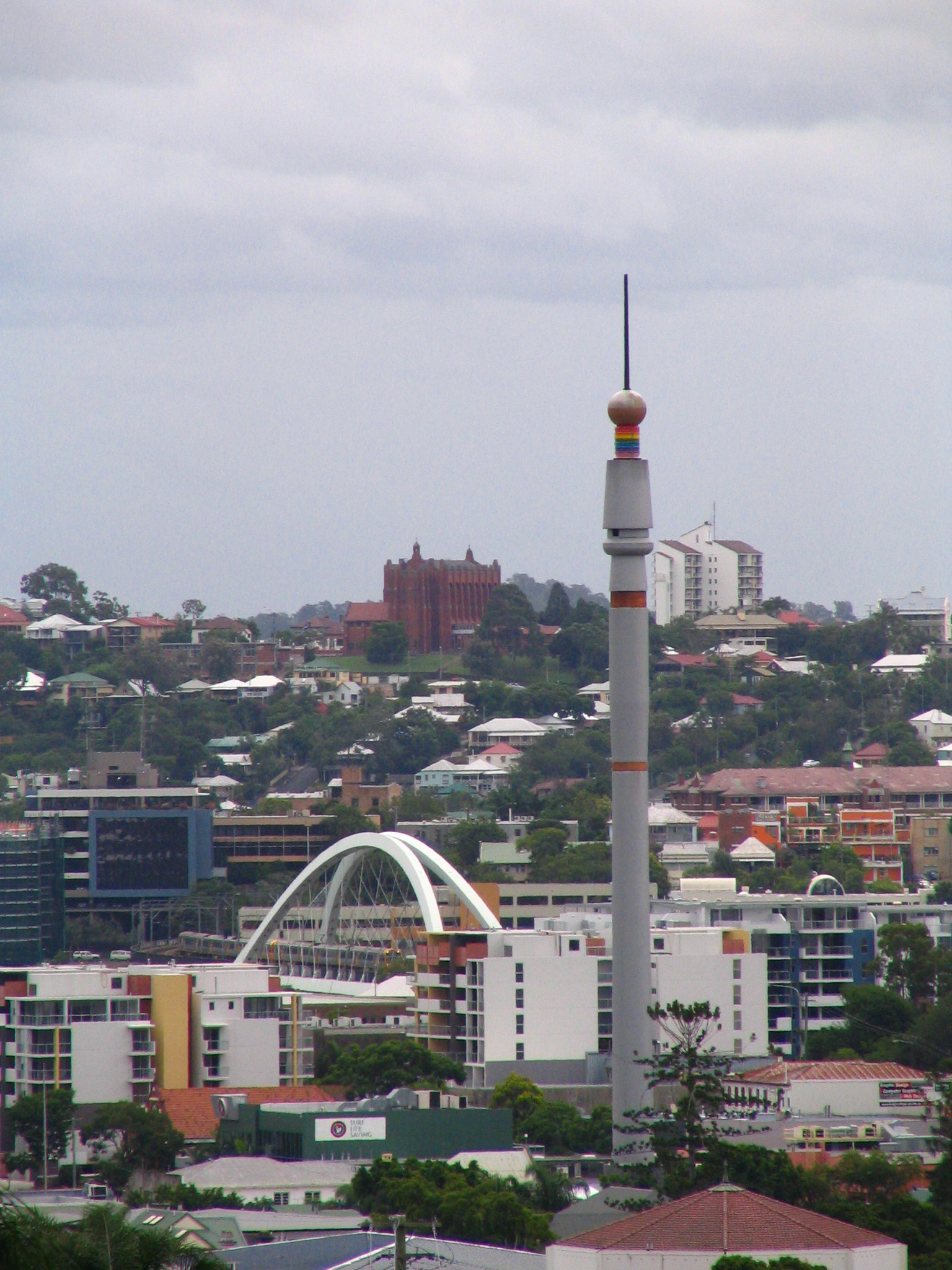
The Skyneedle during March 2006 and the Merivale St Bridge

The Skyneedle is a prominent feature of the Brisbane skyline which was constructed specially for World Expo 88.

The 88 m landmark was earmarked for relocation to Tokyo Disneyland (following the completion of Expo '88). However, hairdresser Stefan Ackerie stepped in and purchased the Skyneedle, which was then relocated to the Stefan HQ at South Brisbane. After purchase, Stefan added his firm's signature rainbow rings logo to the top of the tower.

The Skyneedle's light, which is capable of emitting a beam of light that may be seen 60 kilometres (37 mi) away, is rarely seen except on special occasions, because of safety concerns for flight paths around Brisbane Airport.

On 4 November 2006, the Skyneedle caught fire due to an electrical fault, this incident being the second of its kind after a similar fire had broken out in 1988. Subsequent investigations have found that the fault was most likely caused by bird droppings. Ackerie has stated that it will be restored to its former glory. On 5 November 2006, Ackerie revealed that the Skyneedle will be technologically overhauled with the additional feature of a sound system.

On 14 March 2009, the top 22-metre section of the Skyneedle was removed. Stefan announced that the section was being rebuilt with new laser technology. The Skyneedle, with its new technology, made its debut on Thursday 23 April 2009 but was officially activated on Friday 1 May by Stefan and Channel Nine weatherman Garry Youngberry on the 6pm news. The new lightshow includes an RGB LED display strip from Italy and a powerful set of German-made spotlights. As of 2019 however, the Skyneedle's light system has once again stalled.

In April 2015 Ackerie announced that he was selling the Skyneedle and the surrounding land to Pradella Group who planned to incorporate the tower into a 12-storey residential apartment complex. This development was granted approval by the Brisbane City Council in August 2015 with Lord Mayor Graham Quirk announcing that the Skyneedle would be integrated into the development with a café being opened underneath it.

== Gallery ==
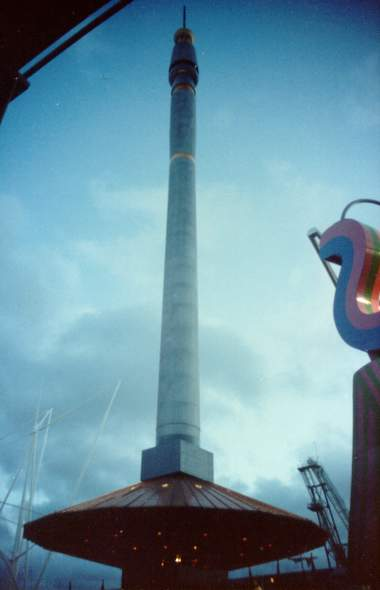
The Skyneedle at
World Expo 88

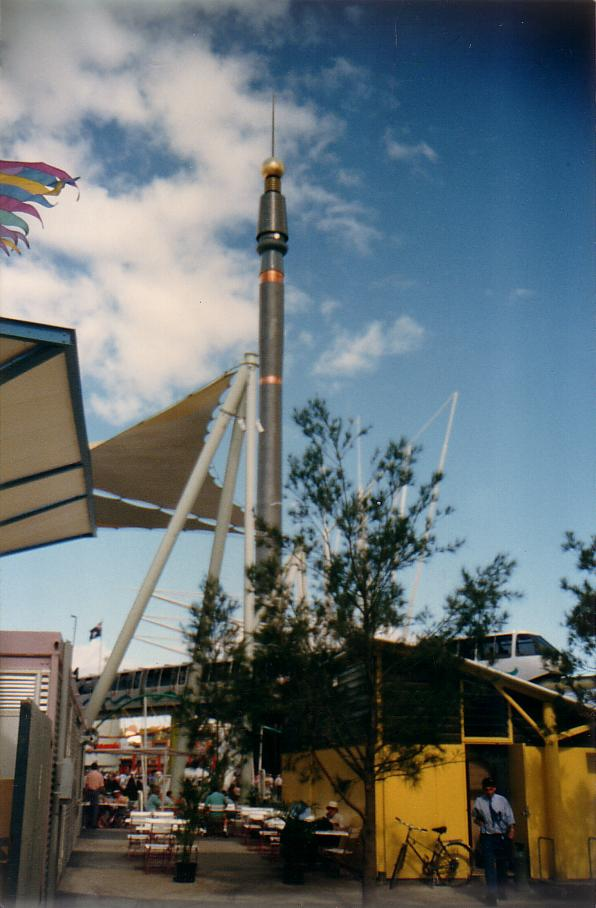
The Skyneedle at
World Expo 88

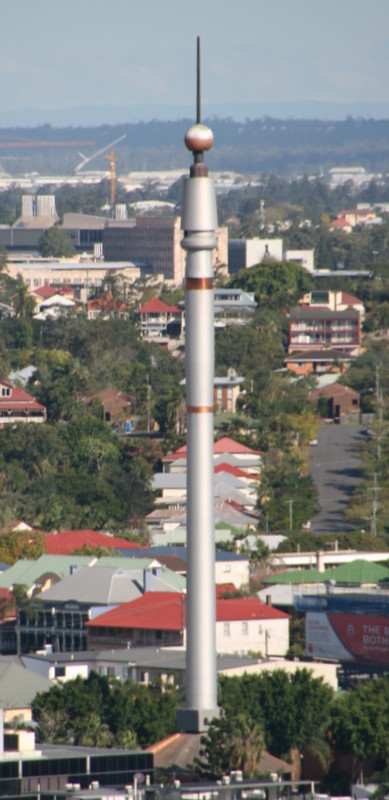
The Skyneedle (2006)

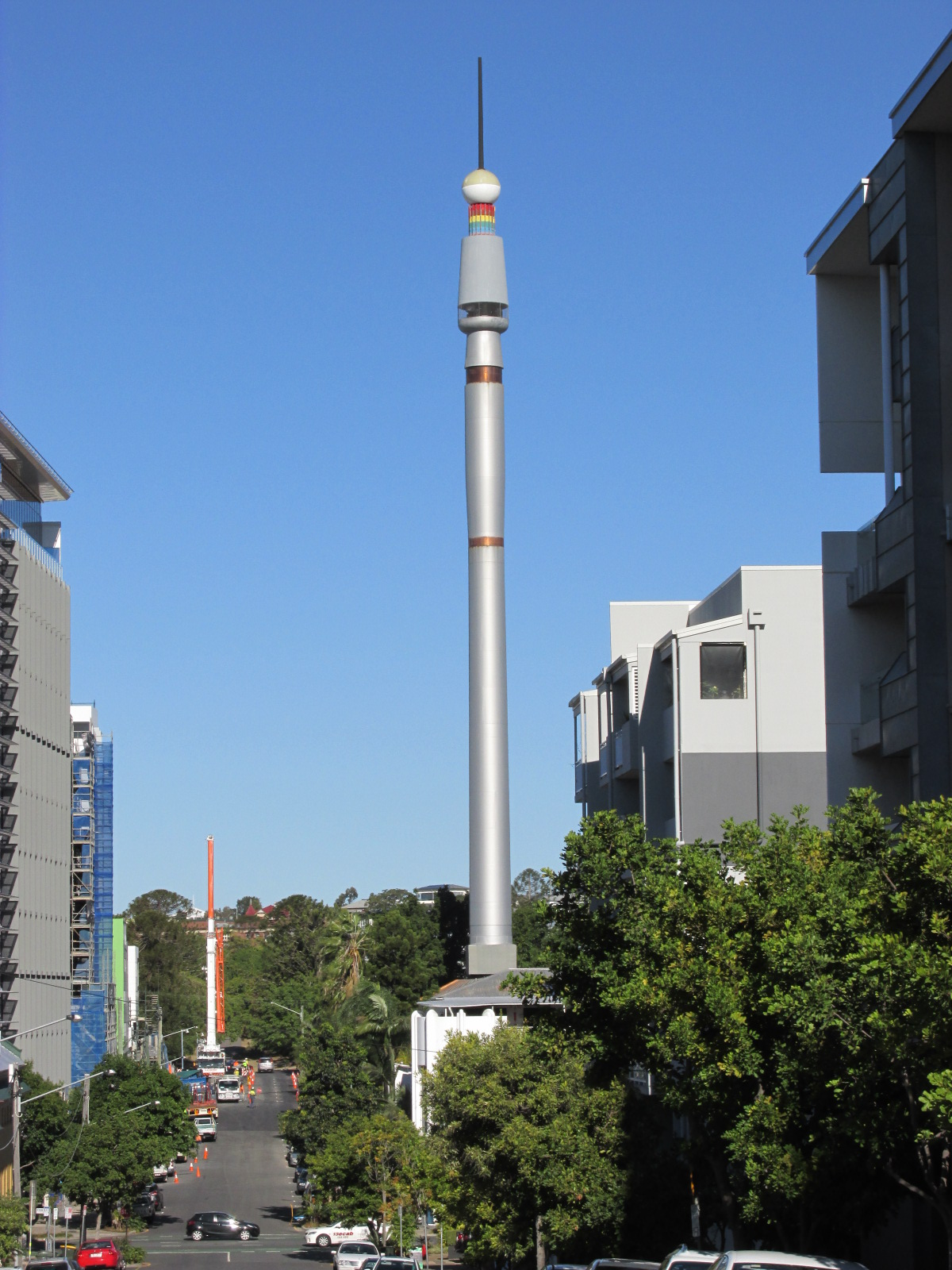
The Skyneedle (2014)
(taken from Edmondstone Street)

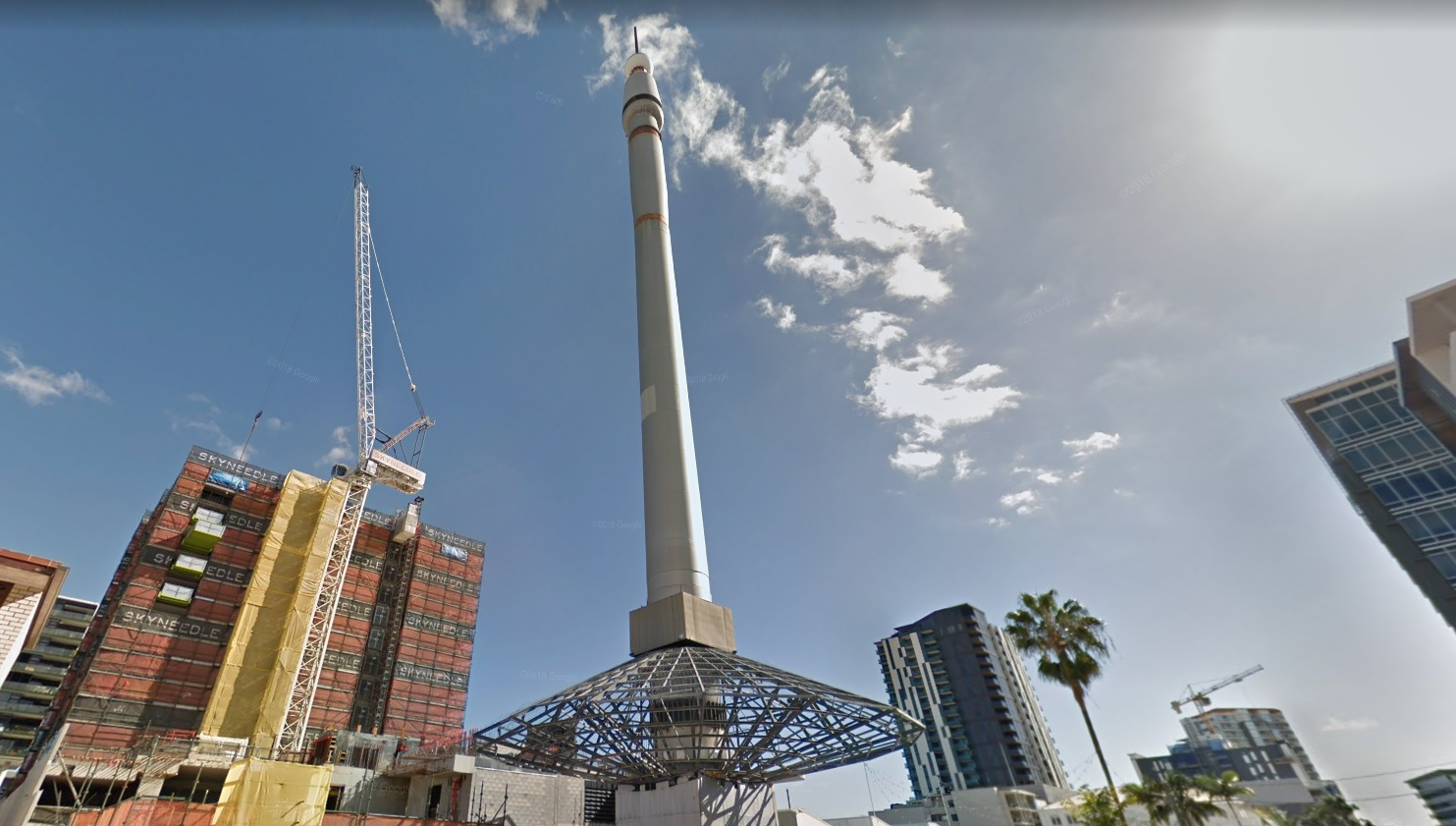
The Skyneedle (2018)
(During the construction of Skyneedle Apartments)
