= World Expo 88 =

World's fair held in Brisbane, Australia, in 1988

1988 Brisbane
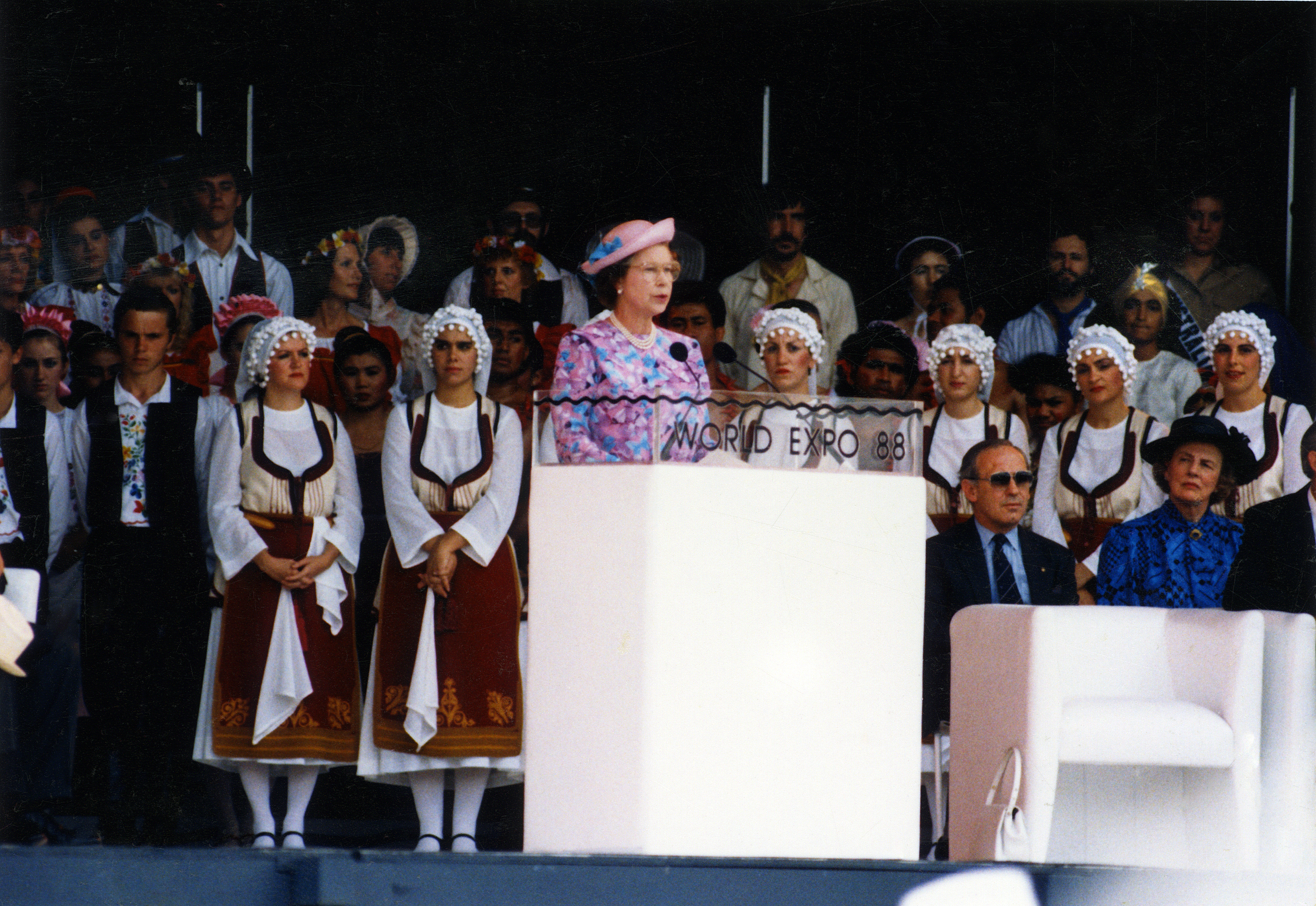
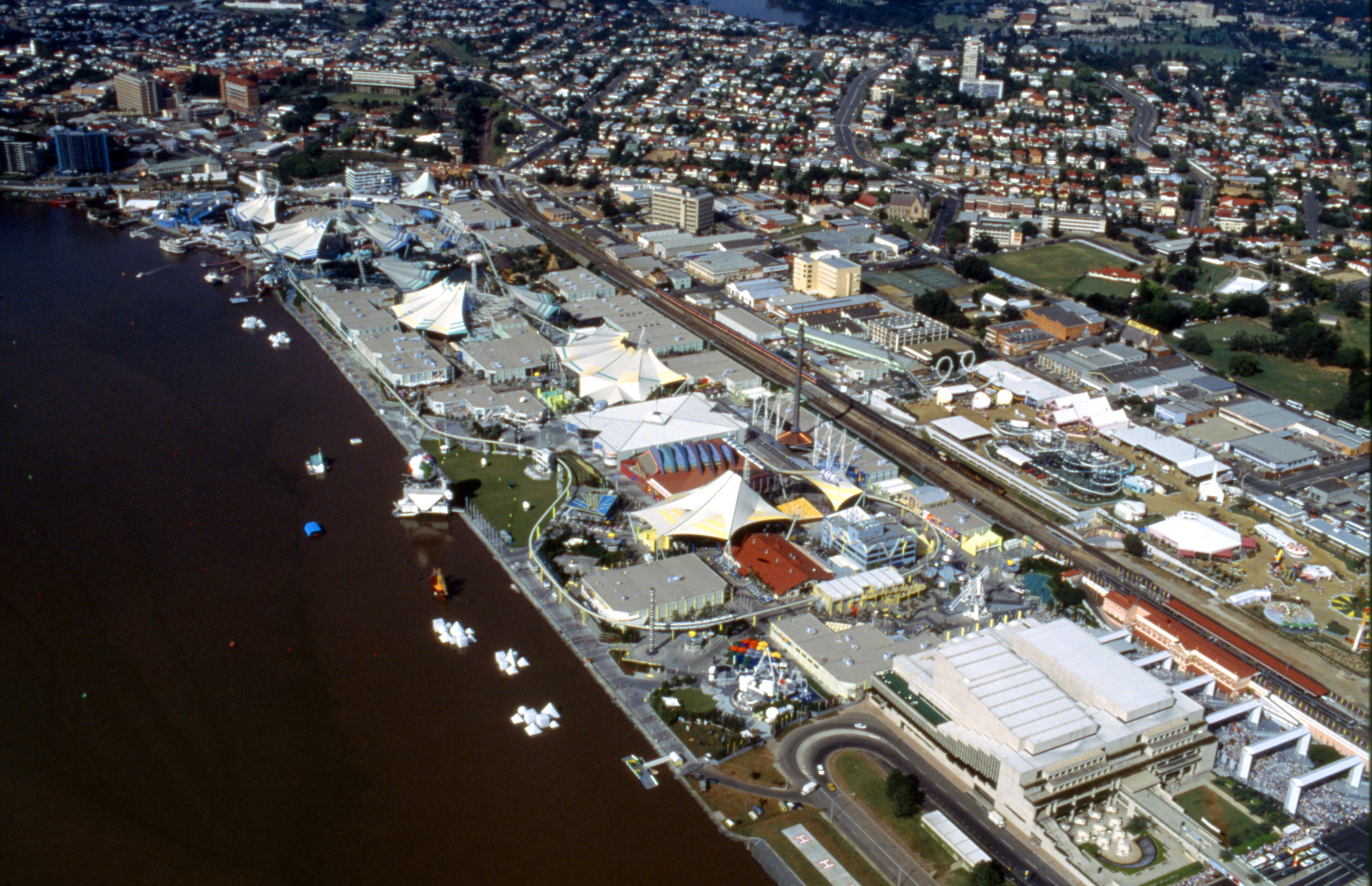
- Queen Elizabeth II opening Expo 88 Aerial view of the Expo 88 site

Overview
- BIE-class: Specialised exposition
- Name: World Expo 88
- Motto: "Leisure in the Age of Technology"
- Area: 40 hectares (99 acres)
- Visitors: 18,574,476
- Mascot: Expo Oz

Participant(s)
- Countries: 41

Location
- Country: Australia
- City: Brisbane
- Venue: South Brisbane
- Coordinates: 27°28′35.9″S 153°1′18″E

Timeline
- Awarded: 5 December 1983
- Opening: 30 April 1988
- Closure: 30 October 1988

Specialised expositions
- Previous: Expo 86 in Vancouver
- Next: Expo 91 in Plovdiv

Universal expositions
- Previous: Expo '70 in Osaka
- Next: Seville Expo '92 in Seville

Horticultural expositions
- Previous: Glasgow Garden Festival in Glasgow
- Next: Gateshead Garden Festival in Newcastle Upon Tyne

Internet
- Website: Celebrate 88!

World Expo 88, also known as Expo 88, was a specialised Expo held in Brisbane, the state capital of Queensland, Australia, during a six-month period between Saturday, 30 April 1988 and Sunday, 30 October 1988, inclusive. The theme of the Expo was "Leisure in the Age of Technology", and the mascot for the Expo was an Australian platypus named Expo Oz.

The A$625 million fair was the largest event of the 1988 Bicentennial celebrations of the arrival of the First Fleet in Sydney Harbour. Expo 88 attracted more than 15,760,000 visitors who bought tickets worth A$175 million. The event achieved both its economic aims and very good attendances, was successfully used to promote Queensland as a tourist destination and it spurred a major re-development at the South Brisbane site. The core feature of the site were the international pavilions. Many of the exposition's sculptures and buildings were retained by various entities around the state and are still in use or on display today.

== History ==
=== Origins ===
The first thoughts of a world expo for Brisbane began soon after James Maccormick, architect for the Australia Pavilion at Expo 67, Expo '70 and Expo '74, was commissioned to do an urban renewal study for Kangaroo Point in the early 70s. It occurred to Maccormick that an exhibition would be an ideal catalyst for such a redevelopment, he later hosted meetings with prominent Queensland business persons and government representatives to discuss the idea. With the Australian Bicentenary looming in 1988, other Australian capitals sought means by which to celebrate the event, including hosting of a Universal Exposition or the Summer Olympic Games. Sydney and Melbourne both made representations to the Federal Government for matching dollar for dollar funding for a Universal Exposition in the 1988 bicentennial year, however, citing the costs of the new Parliament House in Canberra, also to be opened in the same year, these proposals were knocked back. But 12 years later the 2000 Summer Olympics were held in Sydney, and Brisbane will be the 2032 Summer Olympics host city .

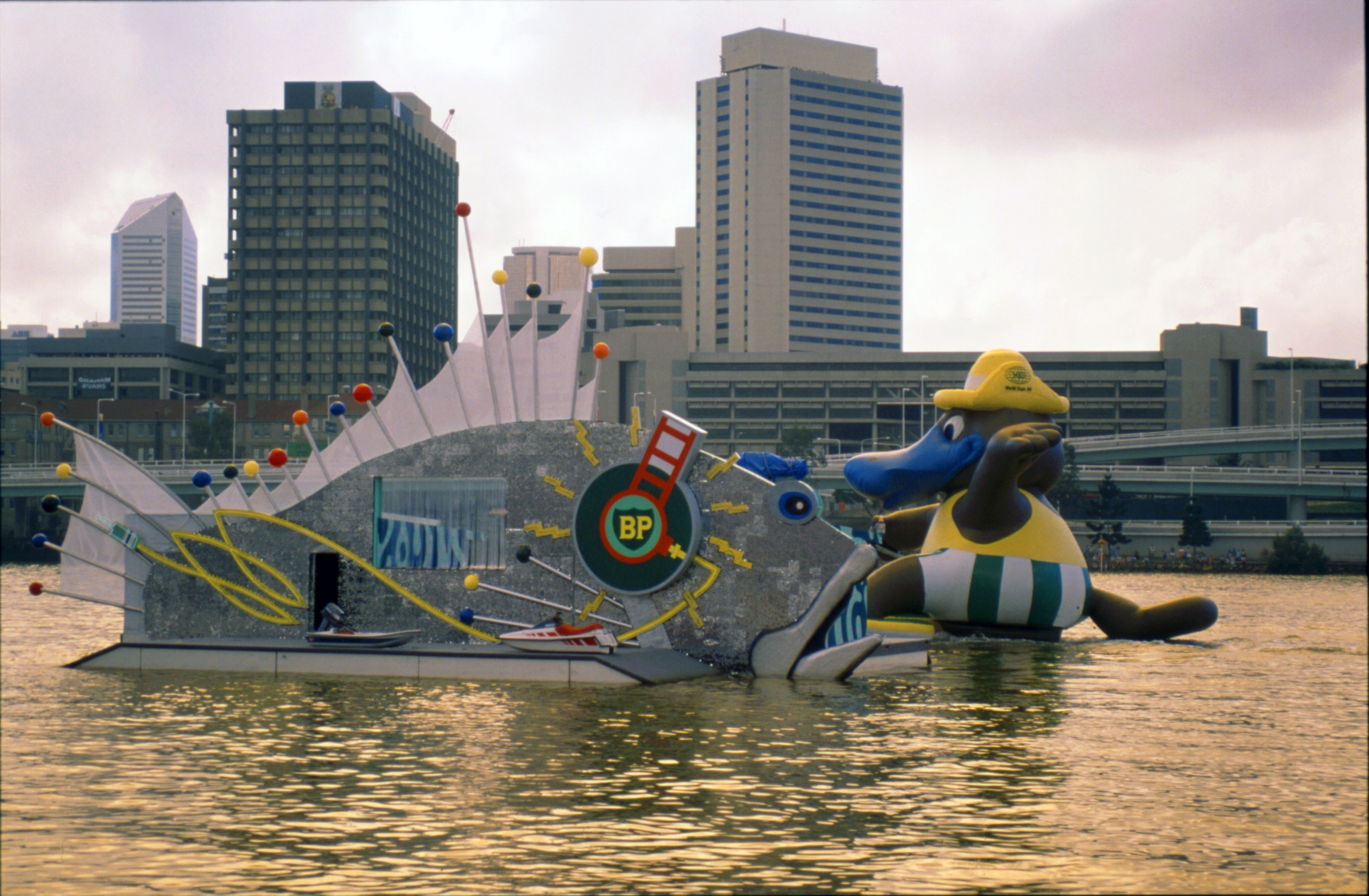
Expo 88 Brisbane River Entertainment, Brisbane, c. 30 April 1988

Brisbane, under Premier Sir Joh Bjelke-Petersen, then developed Maccomick's earlier proposal to host an international-scale exposition, however at no cost to the Australian taxpayer, a world's first 'free enterprise' World Exposition, which the Federal Government rubber stamped.

With federal representation, at the December 1983 Bureau International des Expositions (BIE) General Assembly, Brisbane won the right to hold the 1988 World Exposition, as a specialised international exposition. Immediately, the Brisbane Exposition and South Bank Redevelopment Authority was formed with Sir Llewellyn Edwards, State Deputy Premier, at the helm. Maccormick later was appointed as Joint Chief Architect of the Expo, under the architectural firm Bligh Maccormick 88.

=== Construction ===
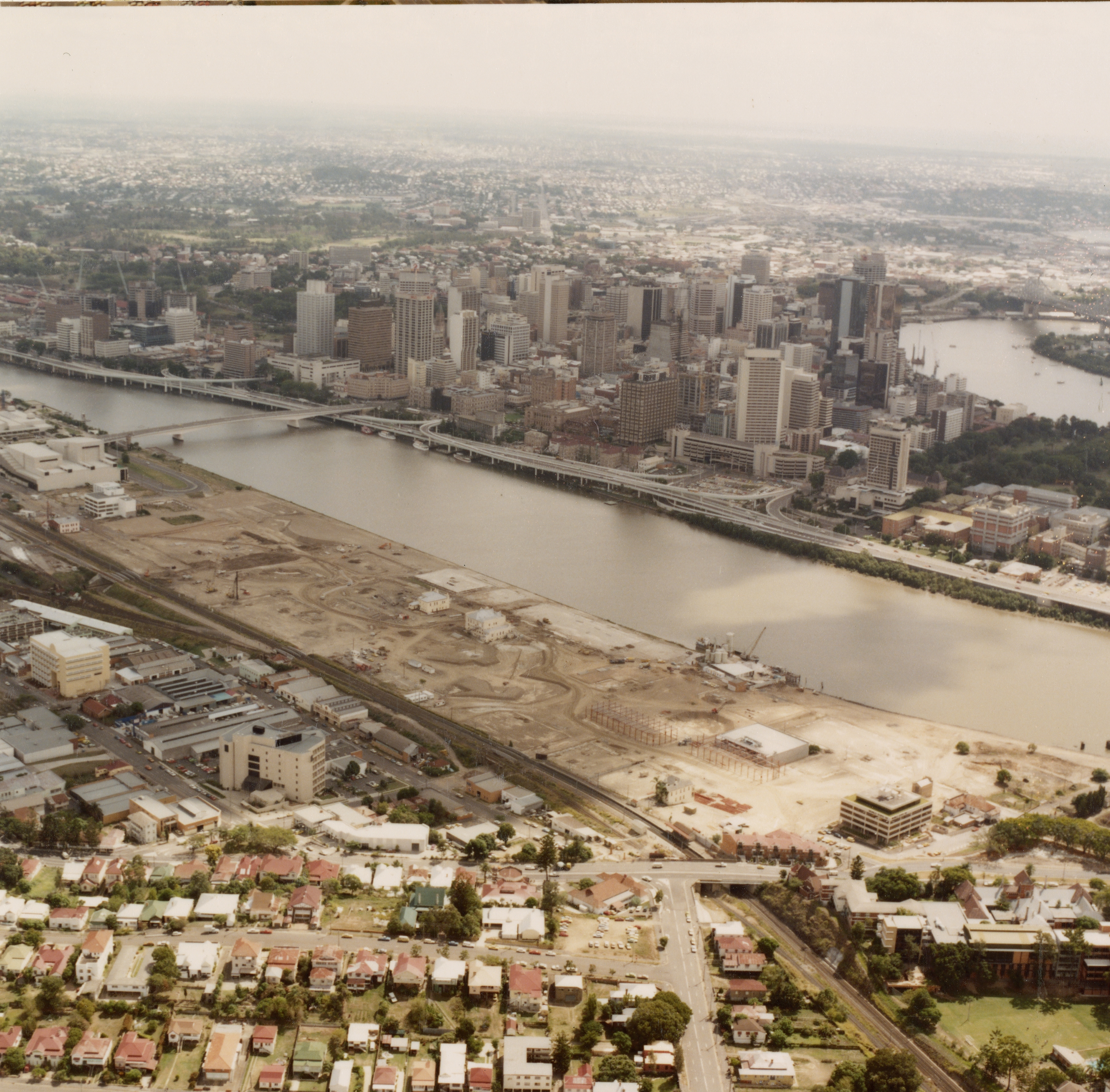
Expo 88 site, c. 1987

World Expo 88 occupied a mixed usage 40-hectare (98.8 acres) resumed (acquired/taken, as in "Eminent domain") parcel of land on the South Bank of the Brisbane River, opposite the city's central business district. For many years this mainly industrial area had been largely derelict. Stanley Street was permanently excised between Melbourne Street and Vulture Street while Grey Street was reinstated after the showground was demolished. The creation of Expo, along with the recent construction of the Queensland Cultural Centre, helped to revive the area. Construction was coordinated by Brisbane-based Thiess Contractors Pty Ltd.

Around 100 sculptures were commissioned, purchased or borrowed for World Expo 88 at a cost of $25 million. Large sun sails were erected over the site to provide shade from the hot Queensland climate. These were an icon of the Expo, becoming an element of Expo's sun-sails logo. Two thousand kilometres of telecommunication wire were laid during construction of the site.

A A$4.5 million 88-metre (289.37911 feet) symbolic tower for the Expo was constructed, called The Night Companion (also known as "The Skyneedle"), which featured a gold and copper dome black spire top, with a xenon laser beam eye that scanned the Brisbane horizons each Expo evening up to 60 kilometres (37 mi) away.

The main entry gate was the Melbourne Street gate at the northern end of the campus, located on the current Grey Street alongside South Brisbane Station.

=== Monorail ===
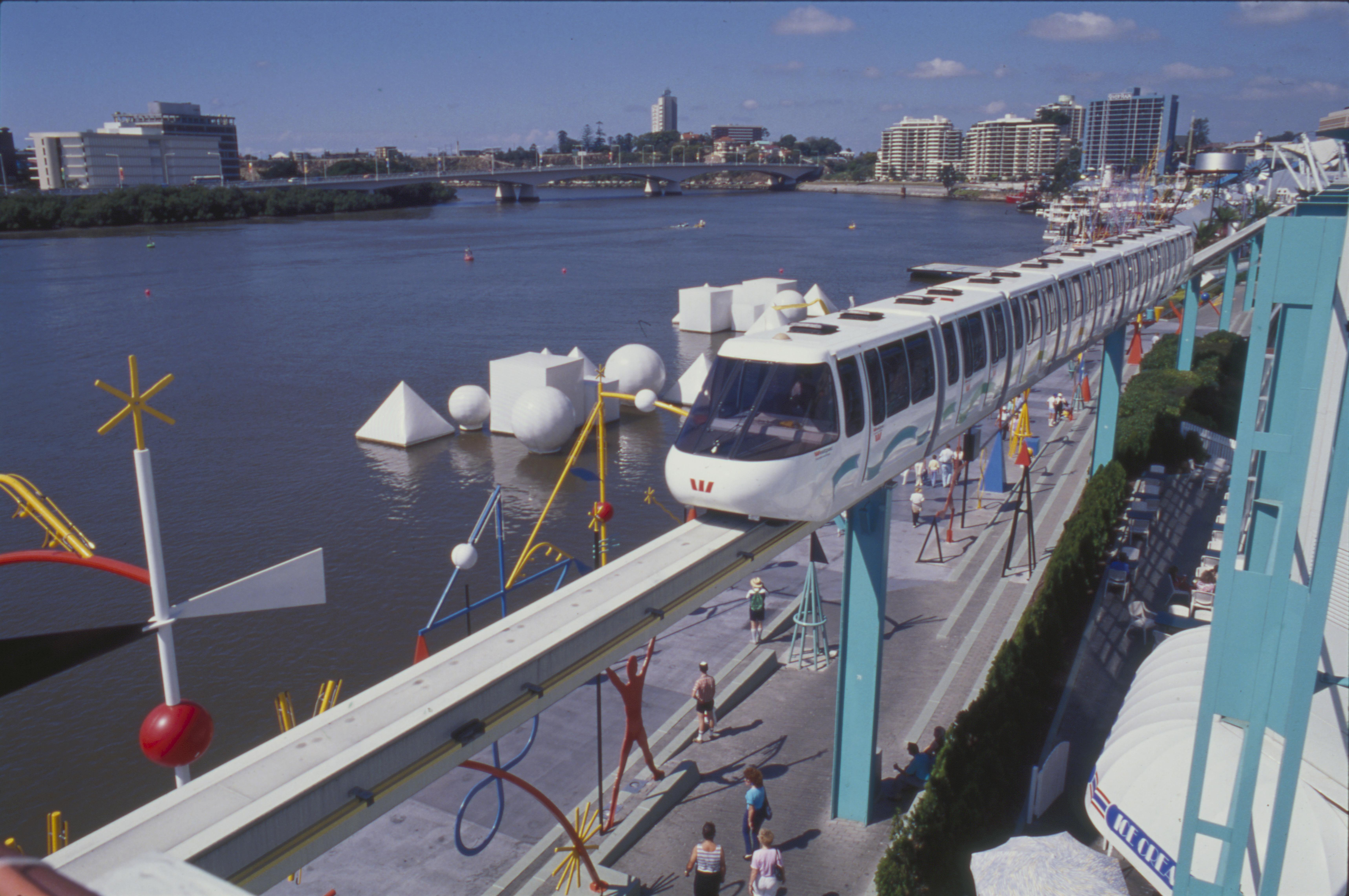
Expo 88 monorail

A Von Roll MkII monorail was constructed for World Expo 88 to take visitors quickly around the Expo site. Costing A$12 million, it consisted of 2 stations at either end of the site, 2.3 kilometres (1.4 mi) of track and 4 nine-carriage trains. The route travelled through the Queensland Pavilion, across the Pacific Lagoon and alongside the Brisbane River. The system was able to carry 44,000 passengers per day. Following Expo, one of the trains and some track joined the existing Sea World Monorail System at Sea World on the Gold Coast. The other three trains were bought back by Von Roll and are now running at the German theme park Europa-Park in Rust since 1995.

== The Fair ==
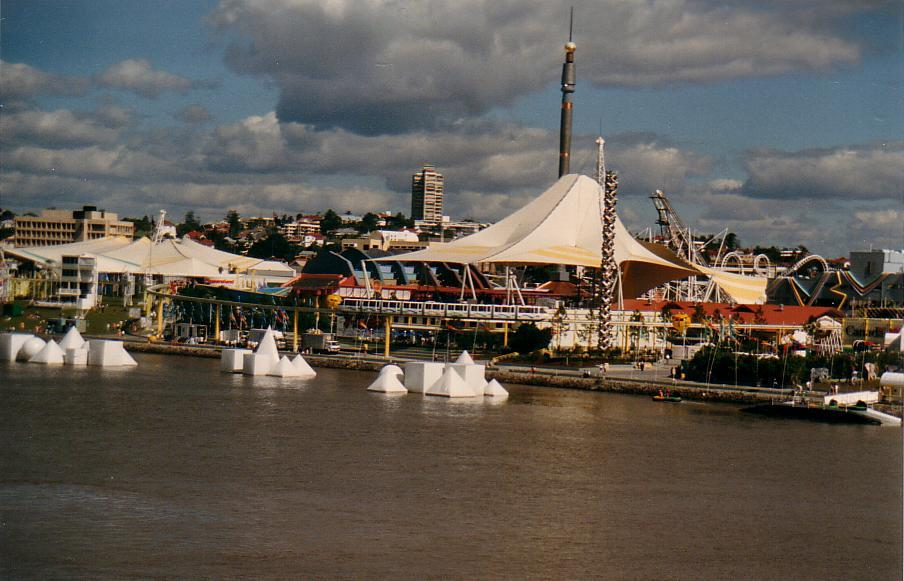
World Expo 88 – showing sunsails and monorail

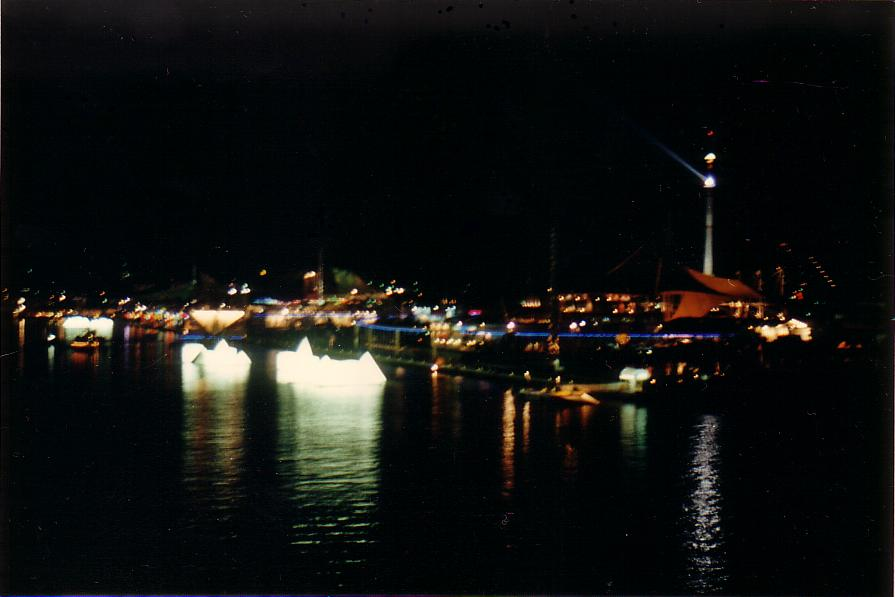
Expo 88 at night – showing the 88-metre high Skyneedle

A ticket to the fair allowed entry to the World Expo Park amusement park at the same location. Although originally intended to be a permanent feature, the park remained open for only one year after Expo had closed. The fair was open daily from 10 am to 10 pm.

The Expo sunsails and the Expo tower Night Companion can be seen clearly here, as well as the monorail. Some of the rides of the World Expo Park can be seen in the background. The 'cubistic flotilla' can be seen in the foreground. World Expo 88 was opened by Queen Elizabeth II on Saturday, 30 April 1988 to much fanfare. The fair attracted more than 18 million visitors, including staff and VIPs, more than double the predicted 7.8 million, and was considered a turning point in the history of Brisbane, which had recently successfully hosted the 1982 Commonwealth Games. With Expo 88 Queensland had transformed itself from a northern backwater into Australia's "most progressive state".

The commissioner general for World Expo 88 was Sir Edward Williams (who was also the chairman for the also very successful 1982 Commonwealth Games). The chairman and chief executive officer, the former state government minister Sir Llewellyn Edwards, was appointed in February 1984. The general manager was Bob Miniken and the entertainment director was Ric Birch (who would soon become one of the greatest experts in Olympic ceremonies and large-scale events in the world). Landscaping at the site was done by Brisbane landscape architect Lawrie Smith. The landscaping was based on nine precincts and used more than 150,000 temperate and tropical plants.

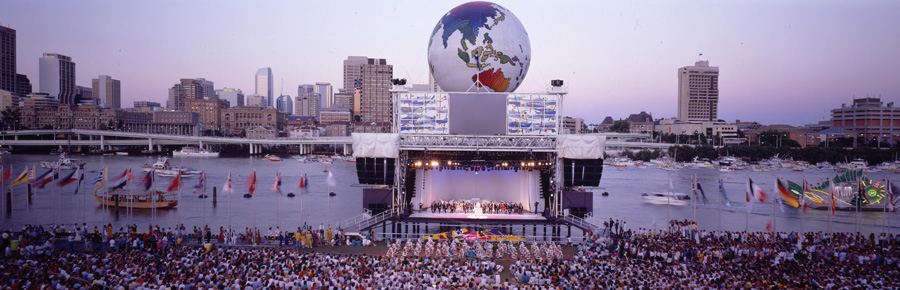
A panorama view of the stage and Brisbane River during World Expo 88

=== Pavilions ===
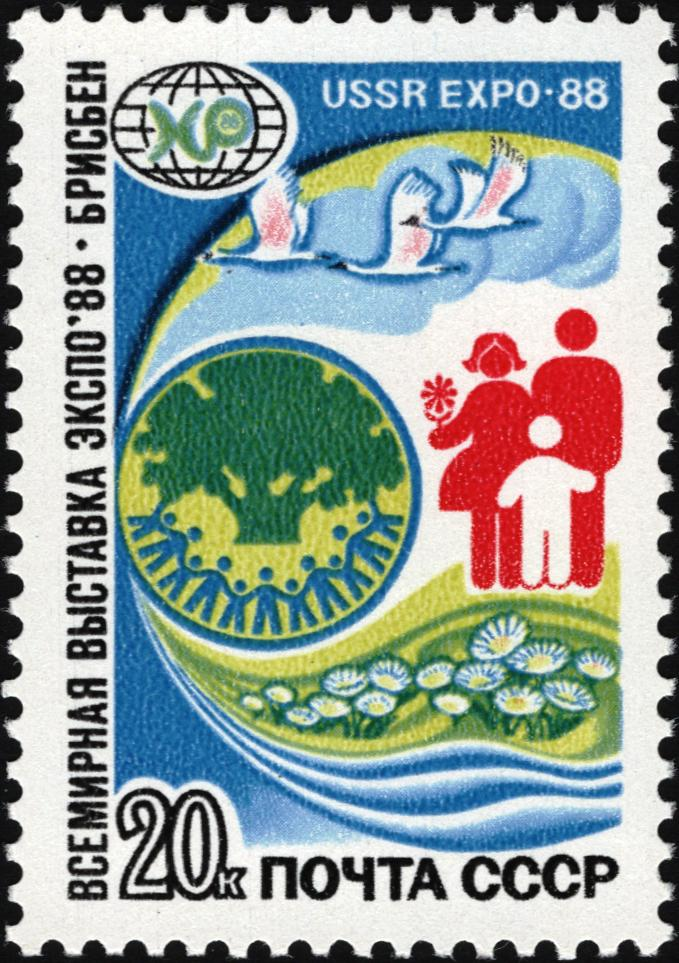
1988 Soviet commemorative stamp

Participating Nations
Australia	Brunei	Canada	China
Cook Islands	Cyprus	Fiji	France
Greece	Hungary	Indonesia	Italy
Japan	Kenya	Malaysia	Nepal
New Zealand	Pakistan	Papua New Guinea	Philippines
Singapore	Solomon Islands	South Korea	Soviet Union
Spain	Sri Lanka	Switzerland	Thailand
Tonga	United Kingdom	United States	Vanuatu
Vatican City	West Germany	Western Samoa	(Socialist Federal Republic of Yugoslavia) Yugoslavia

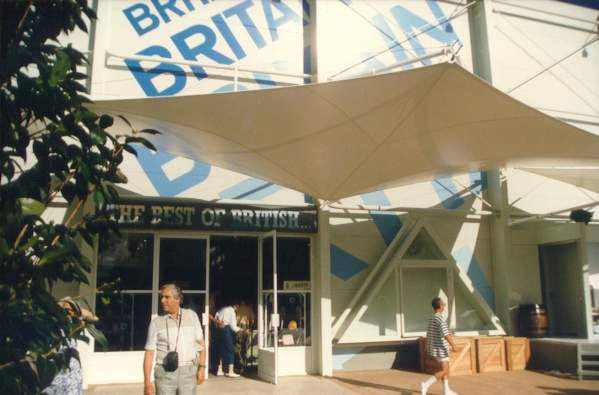
British Pavilion

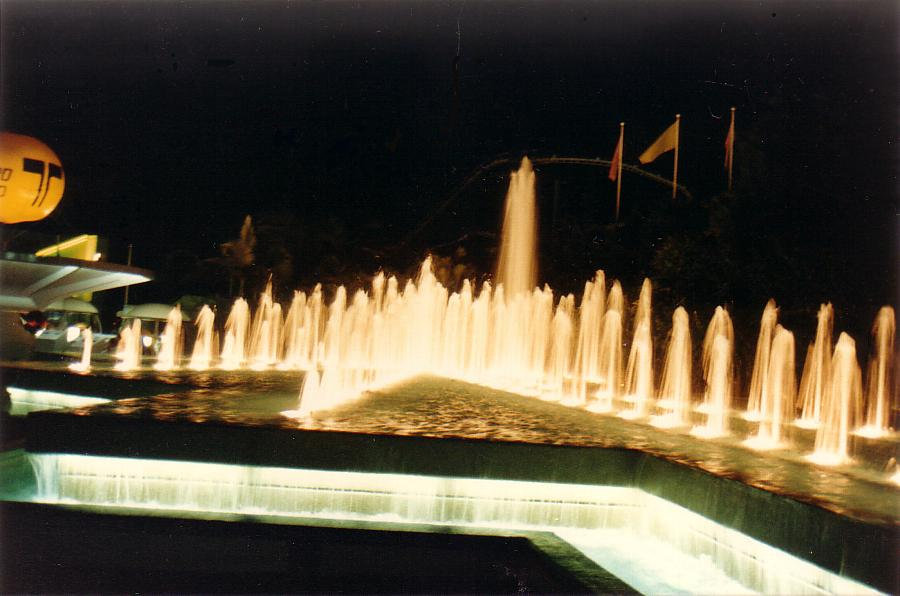
Sound sensitive fountains outside the West German Pavilion

Despite late entrants into the Exposition due to domestic political measures, World Expo 88 attracted some 100 pavilions, from 52 governments, of which 36 were from international-level, and numerous corporate participants. Major western and European nations were represented such as the United States, the Soviet Union (last representation at a World Exposition), France, West Germany (also last representation at a World Exposition), the United Kingdom, Canada, Spain and Greece, as well as major Asian countries such as Singapore, Thailand, Nepal, Pakistan, China, Japan, Sri Lanka, South Korea, Indonesia, and the Philippines, and amongst others. Close neighbouring countries, New Zealand and Papua New Guinea were also represented.

State-level and multi-lateral organisations included the six Australian states, the United Nations, the European Union, Vatican City, three American states (Hawaii, California and Alaska), one Japanese prefecture (sister state of Queensland, Saitama Prefecture), and one Japanese city (Brisbane's sister city Kobe City).

Corporate pavilions included IBM, Ford, Fujitsu, Queensland Newspapers, Australia Post, Cadbury Chocolate, Suncorp, and the Queensland Teachers Credit Union. NASA and Universal Studios hosted outdoor exhibits, with models of the Space Shuttle and Apollo program, as well as the car KITT from the TV series Knight Rider. Also having its own pavilion was the official Australian TV partner of the Expo, Network Ten, via its Queensland station TVQ, whose news studios were located there for public tours and during the Expo also switched channel frequencies in September (from channel 0 to channel 10) in line with the other state channels.

The most expensive pavilion was Japan (A$26 million), followed by the Queensland Pavilion (A$20 million) and the Australia Pavilion (A$18 million). The largest Pavilions were also Queensland, followed by Australia then Japan.

High-definition television received its Australian premiere at the Japan Pavilion, and the text-based Internet at the Swiss Pavilion. At the University pavilion the world's longest lab experiment was on display. The pitch drop experiment, which features tar pitch slowly dripping through a funnel at a rate of nine drops in 81 years, actually made an unseen drop while on display.

The most popular pavilion was New Zealand with its animated Footrot Flats show and glow worm cave followed by Australia, with its special effects 'Dreamtime Theatre'; Queensland, with its popular 180-metre long people mover ride through Queensland of the present and the future; Japan with its Japan Pond and Garden and hi-tech displays; Switzerland, with its artificial snow ski slope and cable car ride; and Nepal, with its 3-level hand-crafted Nepalese Peace Pagoda.

=== Architecture ===
For the most part, pavilions were housed in pre-fabricated units constructed by the expo authority, with the exception of the Nepalese Peace Pagoda, of Nepal, and aspects of the Kingdom of Thailand Pavilion, amongst others. The Australia Pavilion and Queensland Pavilion, side by side, were also custom-made, with the exterior of the Australia Pavilion notably in the shape and colours of Uluru (Ayers Rock). The Queensland Pavilion was designed by Robin Gibson.

=== Theming ===
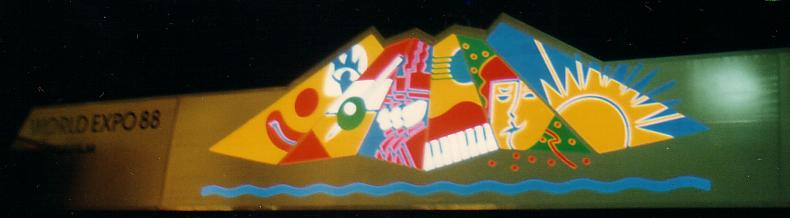
Sunsails logo and World Expo 88 sign at night

Sunsails Logo

Globe Logo

World Expo '88 Logos

The Australian Platypus Expo Oz was a part of the success of the Expo.

As well as the popular platypus mascot Expo Oz, designed by Disney's Imagineering Division, there were several themed initiatives that promoted World Expo 88, most notably the Expo's two interchangeable brands (as noted above): one, a boomerang-styled '88' on a wire frame globe, and the colourful sunsails logo, which superimposed aspects of the Expo's entertainment on a relief of one of the Expo's popular sun sails (designed by Ken Cato, of Cato Purnell Partners). There was also a new weekly theme which allowed special-interest groups to entertain.

The logos were used extensively throughout the Expo site as well as souvenirs, and a costume Expo Oz could be seen as part of the daily parades, shows, and other variety performances. Over 500 items of souvenir memorabilia were made using Expo Oz's image. Expo Oz also featured in extensive international tours in the lead-up to the Expo, to Europe, the US and Japan.

The theme song of the Expo, 'Together We'll Show the World!' by Frank Millward and Carol Lloyd, was also an important rallying point in promoting the Expo in the lead-up to and during phases of the fair, and captured a sense of the excitement of the Expo.

The colourful theme for the Australia Pavilion, which became synonymous with the hosting of the Expo with Australia as host nation, was designed by prominent Australian artist Ken Done, and featured huge playful colourful letters making up the word Australia in an Australia Pavilion Entrance set, and Exit set, with the entrance set a stack of nine, 3x3, some 2.1 metres high each, and the exit set, in a line of nine letters, some 5.6 metres high each. These letters became a popular photo opportunity for the Expo, and the theme was also found on the brightly coloured Australia Pavilion uniforms also.

Five heritage-listed buildings in South Brisbane were refurbished and repurposed for Expo 88. They were retained after its closure and can still be seen today: Plough Inn, Ship Inn, Central House, Collin's Place Spaghetti House, and South Brisbane Municipal Library. The Expo House building on Sidon Street, which housed 'Club 88' and administrative offices, has been incorporated into today's Griffith University South Bank Campus.

=== Entertainment ===
The $38 million entertainment program featured acts from all over Australia and the world at a variety of custom-made performance venues on the World Expo 88 site. This included a 10,000-seat open-air River Stage (for national day events, opening and closing ceremonies and large-scale events), a 850-seat piazza for circus, marching band, acrobatics, magic and mime, and the smaller-scale amphitheatre for national day ceremonies and laser shows. The River Stage was also the venue for the popular evening fireworks and large-scale laser show, set to music, each Expo evening at 10 pm.

Big international and Australian names were a feature at World Expo 88. Perennial Australian favourites such as Icehouse, Little River Band, Mental as Anything, The Cockroaches, Joe Camilleri and the Black Sorrows, John Farnham, Julie Anthony, Simon Gallaher, Wickety Wak and Jon English, were regular performers, as well as concerts by international artists such as Jerry Harrison (of Talking Heads), Julio Iglesias, John Denver, Donny Osmond, Cher and Phyllis Diller. A variety of international theatre, opera, and classical music played at the adjoining World Expo on Stage program at the Queensland Performing Arts Complex.

The exposition averaged 100,000 visitors a day, with highest day of attendance being 184,000 visitors on 29 October 1988, the day before the closing ceremony.

Network 10 was the official television broadcast partner for Expo 88.

At the closing ceremony of World Expo 88 at the River Stage, a concert showcased all the Expo's entertainers singing and dancing. The concert finished up with the Australian pop-folk band The Seekers singing one of their songs, "The Carnival Is Over", at the very end of the celebrations, in what has become an Australian tradition. Judith Durham refused to perform for the Expo '88 closing ceremony celebrations due to her sentiments regarding the mistreatment of Indigenous Australians. Australian soprano Julie Anthony joined the group as the lead vocalist in her stead. During the events of the Expo's closing ceremony, the Night Companion's light beam was stilled. Sir Llewellyn Edwards concluded the Expo with the words "With the Prime Minister, Mr Premier, my Lord Mayor, distinguished guests, and ladies and gentlemen – as the Prime Minister indicated, the carnival is now over, Expo '88 has come to a close.....Thank you for all that have contributed and may the light of World Expo 88 never really fade." A massive fireworks display, the longest in Australia at the time, soon followed, with a burning icon of the World Expo 88 sun sails logo set alight on the Brisbane River.

== Legacy ==
=== The Nepalese Peace Pagoda and South Bank Parklands ===
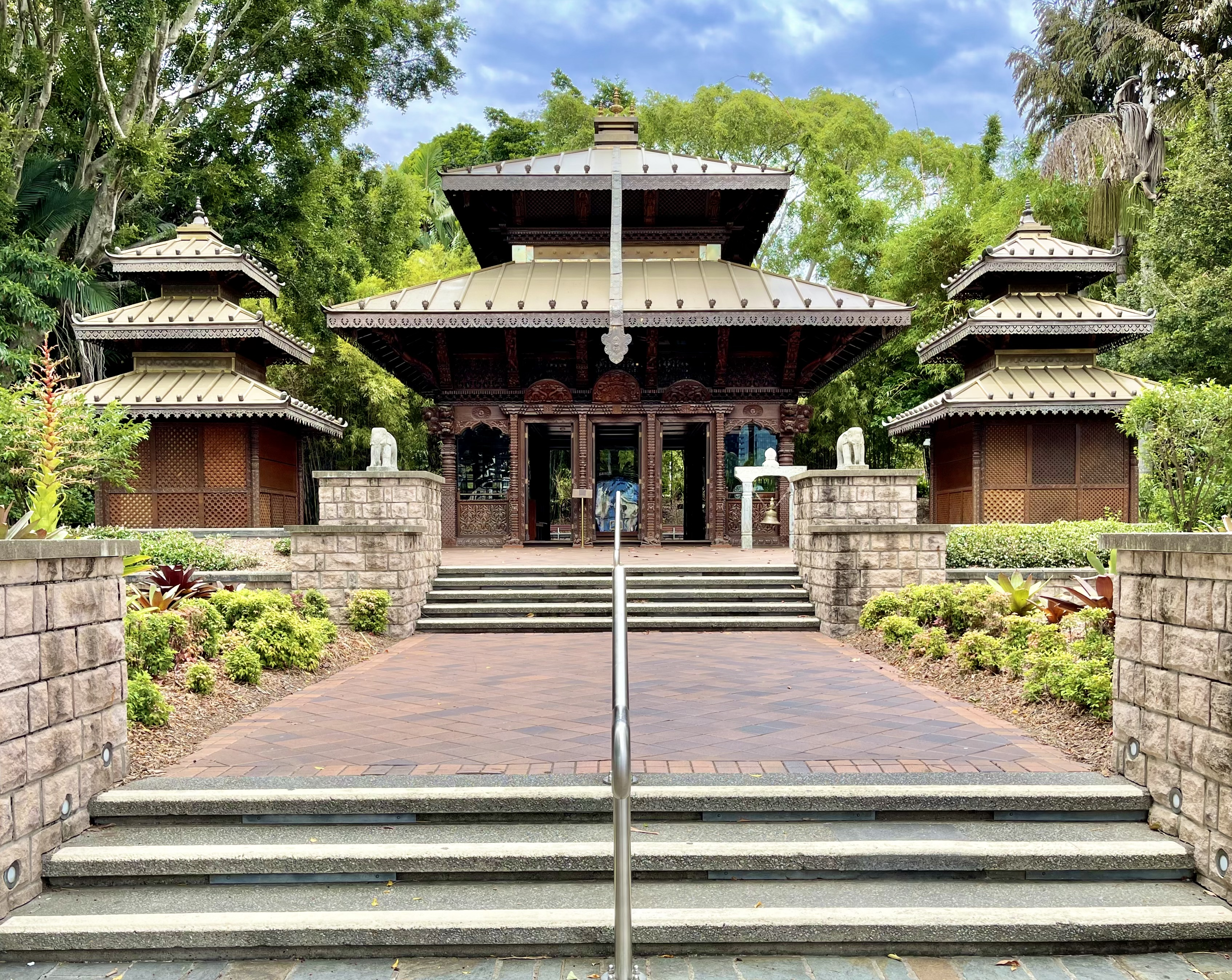
The Nepalese Peace Pagoda in South Bank Parklands

After the end of World Expo 88, various contingency plans were mooted as to possible future developments. One proposal was for a second central business district area to be developed, however this proposal was rejected. A second proposal, incorporating extensive parklands, boutique retail, as well as low-medium residential development, was later accepted, and four years after the closure of World Expo 88, the site was reopened as South Bank Parklands, which is managed by the South Bank Corporation, a State Government corporation.

The only remaining trace of the Exposition on the former site is the Nepalese Peace Pagoda, part of the Nepalese representation, a traditional three-storey handmade wooden replica of a Pagoda in Kathmandu. The popular boardwalk eateries at the southern end of the Expo 88 site were replaced by River Quay Green and modern restaurants in 2011.

=== Riverstage and the Courier Mail Piazza ===
Two of the most popular performing arts venues from World Expo 88 took on a new form at the conclusion of the Expo as Riverstage (at the new venue in the City Botanic Gardens), and the Courier Mail Piazza (formerly called the Suncorp Piazza) at the South Bank Parklands. These two outdoor performing arts venues today welcome visitors to a variety of performing arts genres.

=== The Skyneedle ===
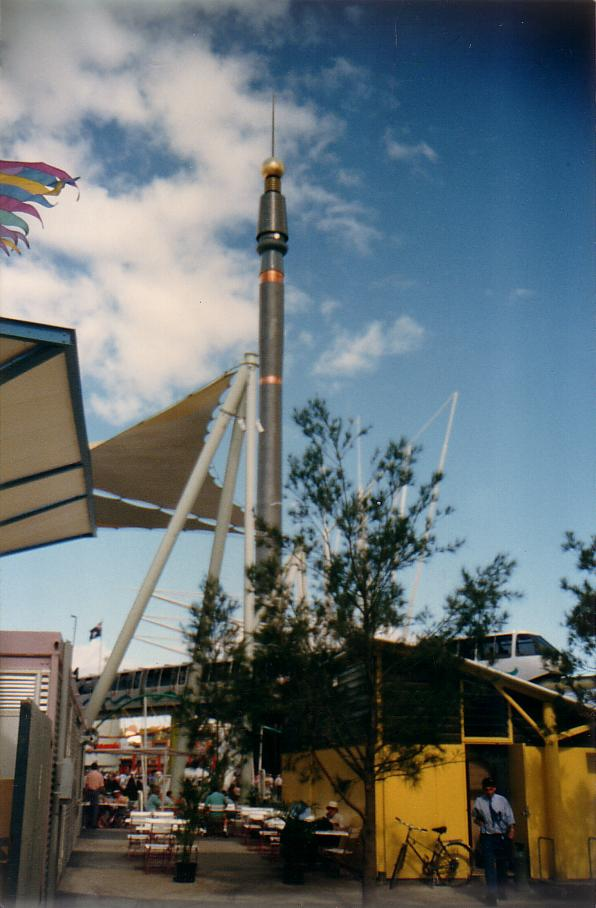
The Skyneedle at World Expo 88

The Skyneedle (or "Night Companion") is 88 m (289 ft) high and beams light skywards with a visibility of more than 60 km (37 mi) during special events.

The Skyneedle, which was originally built for World Expo 88, was to be relocated to Tokyo Disneyland after the Expo. Hairdresser and local celebrity Stefan bought the rights and moved it 500 m (1,600 ft) from its original location at South Bank to his corporate headquarters in South Brisbane, where it remains a local landmark.

=== Sculpture park ===
During World Expo 88, the park was filled with 90 sculptures, one of the largest and most prestigious displays the country had ever hosted. Sixteen pieces were commissioned for the event, while others were on loan. Also the 88-strong white fibreglass 'Human Factor' sculpture series which captured the whimsy of persons in day-to-day life, were also put up for private sale, with many of them being purchased for shopping centres and arcades. Some of the works that were for sale have been purchased by the Brisbane City Council and are on display at various places in the city today, most notably Gidon Graetz's work Mirage in the Brisbane Arcade and American sculptor Jon Barlow Hudson's work Morning Star II located in the City Botanic Gardens. A sectional model or maquette of Jon Barlow Hudson's artwork Paradigm is on display outside State Library of Queensland.

One can view and take part in a Heritage Walk of some of the major works at the World Expo 88 Art Heritage trail at Celebrate 88.

=== The Japan Pond and Garden ===
The Japan Pond and Garden from the Japanese Government Pavilion was gifted to the City of Brisbane at the end of the Expo and was re-located to the Mount Coot-tha Botanic Gardens.

=== Australia Pavilion letters ===
The colourful, large Australia Pavilion letters, designed by Australian artist Ken Done were synonymous with the success of the Expo, and were purchased by Shaftesbury Citizenship Campus at the end of the Expo, for their Burpengary Campus. The end of Expo till 2008 the letters could be viewed along the Bruce Highway near Burpengary as one approached Brisbane City, a reminder of their successful role at World Expo 88. In 2018, the letters were restored and placed at the Caboolture Historical Village.

=== World Expo Park – Brisbane Convention & Exhibition Centre ===
World Expo Park, the Expo's theme park located adjacent to the Expo site, was intended to be a permanent legacy of the Expo at its conclusion. Citing lack of patronage, however, it closed down just a year after the Expo closed its doors. The site of World Expo Park was re-developed into the Brisbane Convention & Exhibition Centre.

=== Queensland Pavilion ===
The Queensland Pavilion was purchased by the Gateway Baptist Church, and now stands on their Mackenzie premises.

=== Victorian Pavilion ===
The Victorian Pavilion was purchased privately and moved to 77 Shore St West, Cleveland, where it is known as Redland Trade Centre.

=== Foundation ===
On 30 April 2004, sixteen years after World Expo 88's official opening, a non-government not-for-profit commemorative entity for the Exposition was launched, named Foundation Expo '88. The Foundation based its activities at the Nepalese Peace Pagoda from the Expo, including a weekly Guided Tours program "Pagoda on Sundays", and hosting at the Pagoda first level a commemorative museum display of memorabilia from Expo, which is still maintained to this day.

For the 10th Anniversary of Foundation Expo '88 in 2014, the Foundation was re-branded into one new entity "Celebrate 88!".

=== Expo Gold ===
The Golden Penda tree (Xanthostemon chrysanthus) was selected as the theme plant for Expo 88. Cuttings of the tree, which is native to north Queensland, were taken from a superior form from a garden in Brisbane and planted in flower in Brisbane to create a 'Sea of Gold'. In late autumn, the tree can still be seen in flower in gardens and lining streets across Brisbane. The tree is also the native floral emblem of Cairns.

=== Q150 Icon ===
In 2009 as part of the Q150 celebrations, Expo 88 was announced as one of the Q150 Icons of Queensland for its role as a "Defining Moment".

== Anniversaries ==
Celebrations for the 20th anniversary were held at South Bank Parklands during May 2008. Celebrations included a charity dinner on 9 May at the Great Hall of the Brisbane Convention & Exhibition Centre, and a community day of celebration on 10 May. It featured entertainment from the Expo, fireworks, interpretive displays and themed walks, and a Suncorp Spirit of Expo Staff Breakfast, also attended by then Lord Mayor of Brisbane Sallyanne Atkinson, and Expo Chair and CEO Sir Llewellyn Edwards.

2013 saw commemorative activities which included a special retrospective exhibition on World Expo 88 entitled "Light Fantastic: Expo 88 Rewired", a special family fun day at the former Expo 88 site, Southbank Parklands, where a special Plaque was also unveiled.

The Brisbane City Council arranged several initiatives to as part of the 30th anniversary celebrations. A special closing event ceremony was held at the Caboolture Historical Village, where the restored Ken Done Australia Pavilion Signs completely restored were unveiled on 28 October 2018.

== See also ==
- History of Brisbane
- List of world expositions
